= Hladaw =

Hladaw လှတော Hla Daw
- Town
- Location in Burma
- Coordinates: 22°23′N 95°41′E
- Country: Burma
- Region: Sagaing Region
- District: Shwebo District
- Township: Wetlet Township
- Elevation: 76 m (249 ft)
- Time zone: UTC+6.30 (MST)

Hladaw (sometimes Hladaw Model Village) is a crossroads village in Wetlet Township of Shwebo District in the Sagaing Region of Burma (Myanmar). It is located on the plains between the Mu River and the Irrawaddy. Hladaw is at the cross roads of the Shwebo–Sagaing road and the Wetlet–Monywa road. Access to the railroad is via Wetlet.
