= Ywa Zin, Khin-U =

Ywa Zin Model Village Yazin Ywar Zin
- Village
- Location in Burma
- Coordinates: 22°46′N 95°37′E
- Country: Burma
- Region: Sagaing Region
- District: Shwebo District
- Township: Khin-U Township
- Model Village: Ywa Zin
- Time zone: UTC+6.30 (MST)

Ywa Zin Model Village is a village in Khin-U Township in Shwebo District in the Sagaing Division of Burma. The principal village is Ywa Zin.
