= Hanlin, Burma =

Halin
- City
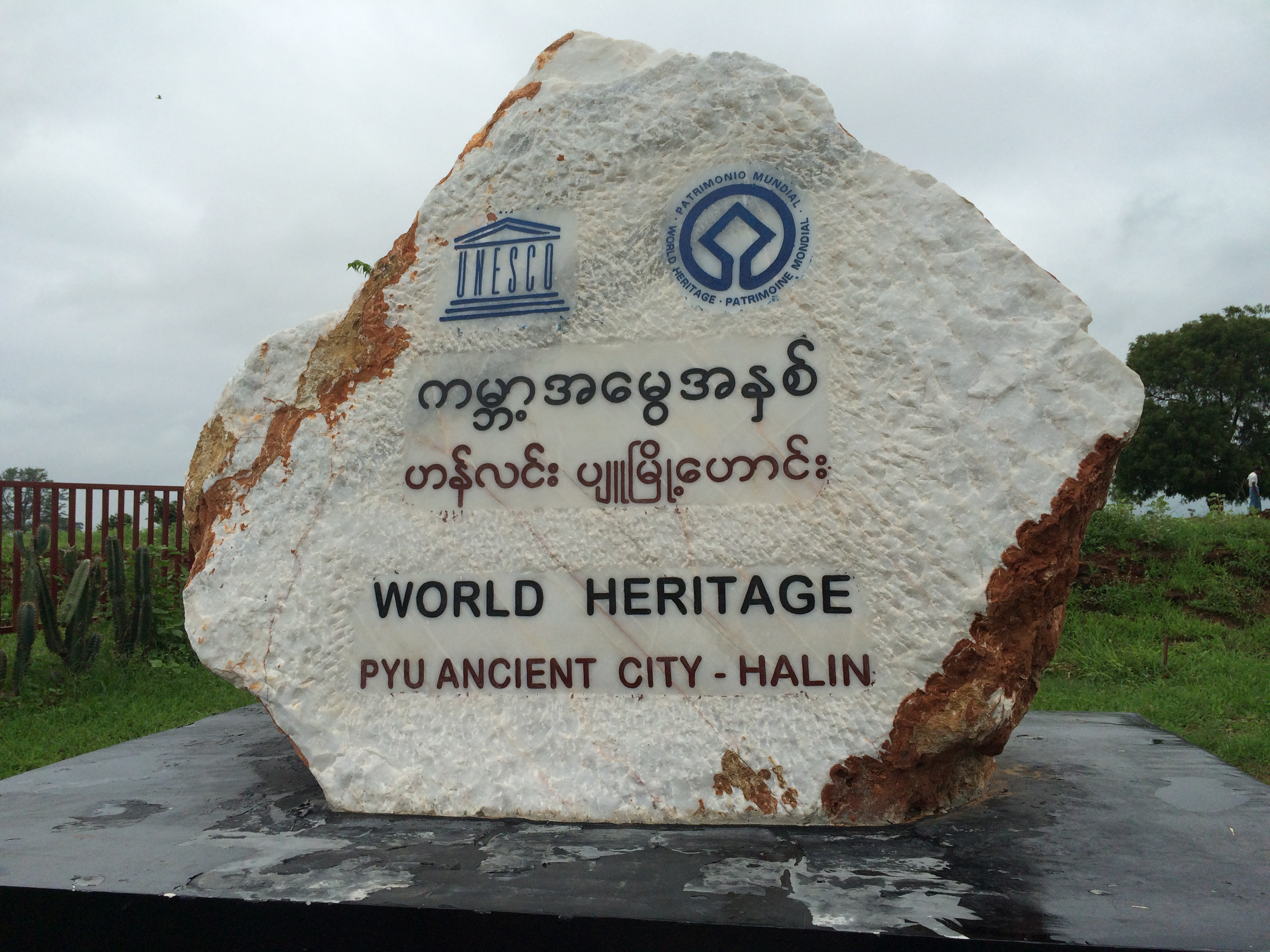
- Hanlin – Pyu Ancient City

- Location in Burma
- Coordinates: 22°28′54″N 95°48′00″E
- Country: Burma
- Region: Sagaing Region
- District: Shwebo District
- Township: Hanlin
- Time zone: UTC+6.30 (MST)

Hanlin (also known as Halingyi, Halin and Halim) is a village near Shwebo in the Sagaing Division of Myanmar. In the era of the Pyu city-states it was a city of considerable significance, possibly a local capital replacing Sri Ksetra. Today the modest village is noted for its hot springs and archaeological sites. Hanlin, Beikthano, and Sri Ksetra, the ancient cities of the Pyu Kingdom were built on the irrigated fields of the Dry Zone. They were inscribed by UNESCO on its List of World Heritage Sites in Southeast Asia in May 2014 for their archaeological heritage traced back more than 1,000 years to between 200 BC and 900 AD.

== Geography ==
The archaeological sites of Hanlin, (also known as Halingyi, Halin, and Halim), are located above the village in the Wetlet Township, Shwebo District, Sagaing Division. It has a population of about 6,400 (2014). It is 12 miles (19 km) to the southeast of Shwebo where 33 archaeological mound excavations have been carried out. One road goes for 6 miles (9.7 km) from the bus terminal to Bo Te village and then along a rough road which is under improvement. The other route is to the south of the bus station for 6 miles (9.7 km) along a bad, rocky road that leads to archaeological site 29 and the village. The village is slightly above the surrounding flat land. The land is generally barren except for some irrigated areas. Following the inscription of the site on the List of World Heritage Sites, approach road conditions for a distance of 16 kilometres (9.9 mi) from Shwebo to Halin are now under improvement with funding provided by Italy.

== History ==
Hanlin's history is linked to the history of the Pyu people who lived between the 2nd century BC to the 9th century AD in the kingdoms that existed at Binnaka, Mongamo, Sri Kshetra, and Halingyi. They spoke the Tibeto-Burman languages. Trade was conducted with China and India. The Pyu's authority extended to eighteen kingdoms, most of them in the southern region of Myanmar. They were refined in their behavior, dress habits, culture, art, and were Buddhists of the Sarvastivada school. The architectural styles which evolved from the 11th to 14th centuries are evident in the Pagan area. Initially their capital city was Sri Kshetra, at the northern edge of the Irrawaddy River delta. In the 7th century they moved their capital to Halingyi which is in the Dry Zone. For trade purposes with foreign countries they still operated from Sri Kshetra. Their southern neighbours were the Mon people who were followers of Theravada Buddhism.

Archaeological findings indicate that habitation existed in this area since the Bronze Age, and that Hanlin was established by the Pyu people only during the 1st or 2nd century BC.

Archaeologists have opined that Hanlin was the largest Pyu city until the 9th century AD. Subsequently, Sri Ksetra near Pyay became a more prominent city. However, over the years Pae culture was overshadowed by the Bagan culture.

=== Legends ===
There are many legends to explain the sudden disappearance of the Pyu kingdoms. According to the Glass Palace Chronicle (1832), the Hanlin civilization was the oldest in Burma and given the following toponyms: Haṃsāvatī, Macchima, Haṃsānagara, Gāmāvatī, Haṃhaṅḥmakhok ( Hanhim-mcaok ) and finally Haṃlaṅḥ ( Hanlin).

It is said that a hot sand storm destroyed most of Hanlin. This occurred because King Bandhava had murdered the Prince of Smile (ပြုံးမင်းထီး), his own brother, when the prince could not smile in order to create a shower of diamonds to fall on a Chinese diplomat. His son had escaped the disaster that befell Hanlin only to return later as a Buddhist to establish the city and build the Shwegugyi Pagoda.This pagoda is now encircled by agricultural fields with many ancient stupas built of bricks, while Hanlin lies to the north and Halingyi to the south.

In another legend it is said that the misdeeds of a prince of Hanlin caused "a rain of ash and molten matter [to] pour down heavily and bury[ing] the city completely".

== Archaeological finds ==
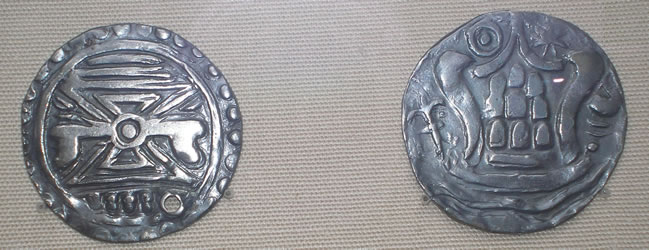
Silver coins found at Hanlin

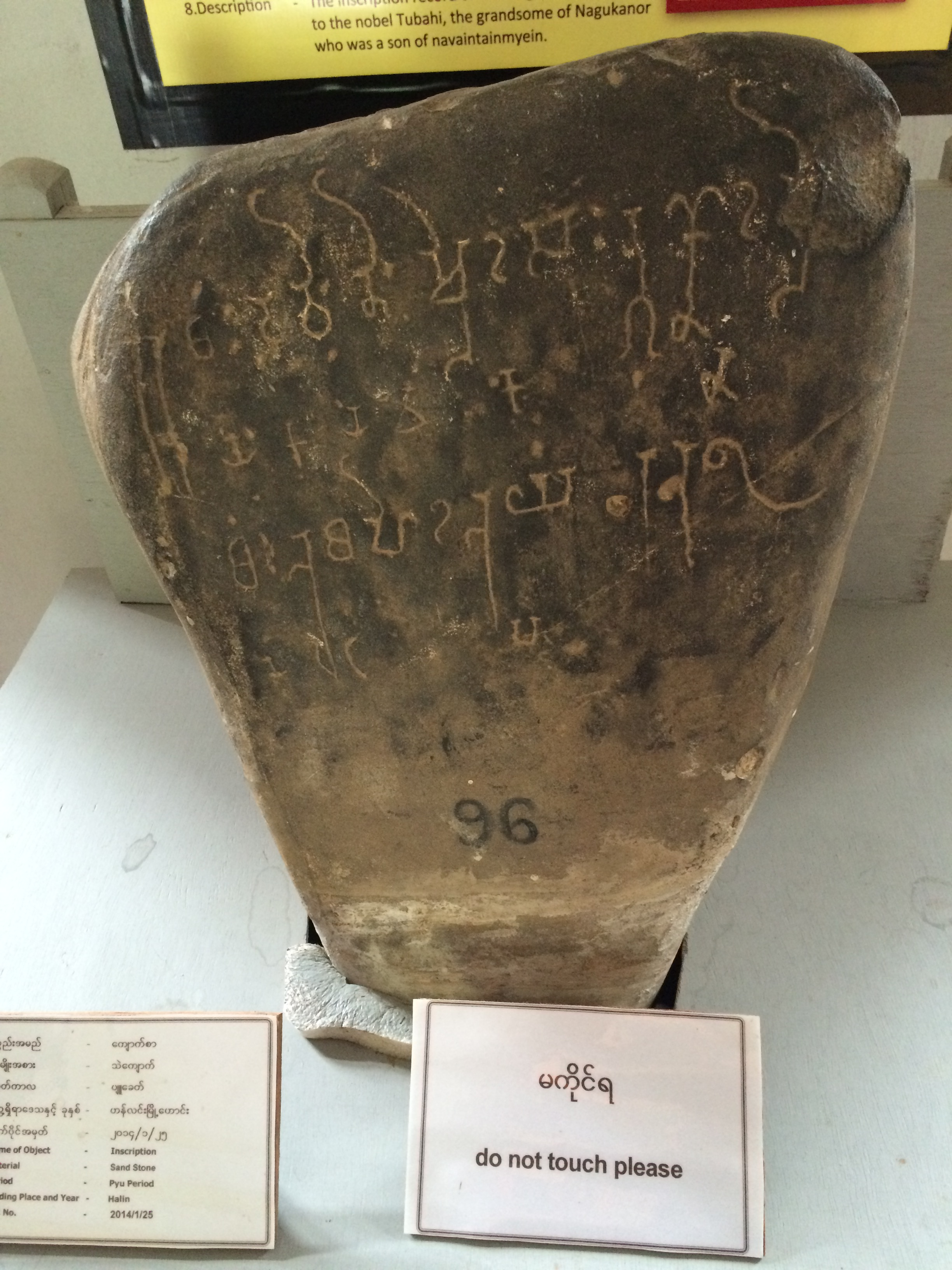
A Pyu inscription in Hanlin

Archaeological excavations have been carried out by the Department of Archaeological National Museum and Library during 1904–05, 1929–30, 1962 to 1967, and from 1963 to 2012. Thirty three mounds have been excavated so far in Hanlin City, in the southern and northern areas of Shwegugyi Pagoda, and in the old Halin town. These have unearthed structures of palace fortresses, cremation grounds, manufacturing sites, brick monuments of Buddhist stupas, walls in different sizes, and water management structures. Also unearthed were eleven human skeletons in fossilized condition.

Archaeological excavations at Hanlin village have also unearthed a city enclosed within walls which have twelve gates and show the tell tale marks of a moat. This city is in a rectangular shape and has an area of 541.4 hectares (1,338 acres). It is situated on an undulating terrain of volcanic material at a distance of about 16 kilometres (9.9 mi) from the Ayeyarwady River and 27 kilometres (17 mi) from the Mu River to its western side. In the explored area, hot water springs have been found which are stated to have curative properties. A particular find of interest is at excavation site designated HL-22 where three sets of standing stone slabs dating to the 2nd AD are indicative of the megalithic culture. The Southern Gateway has been dated to about 200 AD.

At a museum near the archaeological site of Shwegugyi there are exhibits which show archaeological finds from excavations including: human skeletal remains, along with pottery, jewelry, and bronze rattles laid in graves in a series of rows, found below ground. Carbon dating of some of the earliest grave finds indicate that they are almost 5,000 years old. The museum also has exhibits of finds of: silver coins, gold ornaments, bricks with inscriptions of texts, and many antiquities recovered from the Hanlin sites. The Pyu alphabet with links to Sanskrit and the present day Bamar language, inscribed on a tomb stone, is also on display.

In 2024, new radiocarbon dating gave a sequence of dates from the early third millennium BCE to the early second millennium CE. The earliest dates would make Halin the oldest known Neolithic site in mainland Southeast Asia.

== UNESCO inscription ==
In October 1996, Hanlin, Beikthano, and Sri Kestra were proposed to be inscribed on the UNESCO World Heritage List. This proposal was approved by UNESCO in the 38th session of the World Heritage Committee held in May 2014 in Doha, Qatar. According to the UNESCO report, the Pyu Kingdom prospered for over 1,000 years between 200 BC and 900 AD. All three sites are inscribed under Criterion (ii), (iii), and (iv) covering an area of 5,809 hectares (14,350 acres) with a buffer zone of 6,790 hectares (16,800 acres). The integrity assessment by UNESCO of the three sites is: "The completeness and reliability of dated archaeological sequences from the site, with the radiocarbon dates derived from intact architectural features dating back to 190 BCE, provide scientific proof of the entire one-thousand year period of occupation of the cities, and reinforces palaeographic dates provided by inscriptions in Pyu script on artifacts excavated at the site"

== Gallery ==
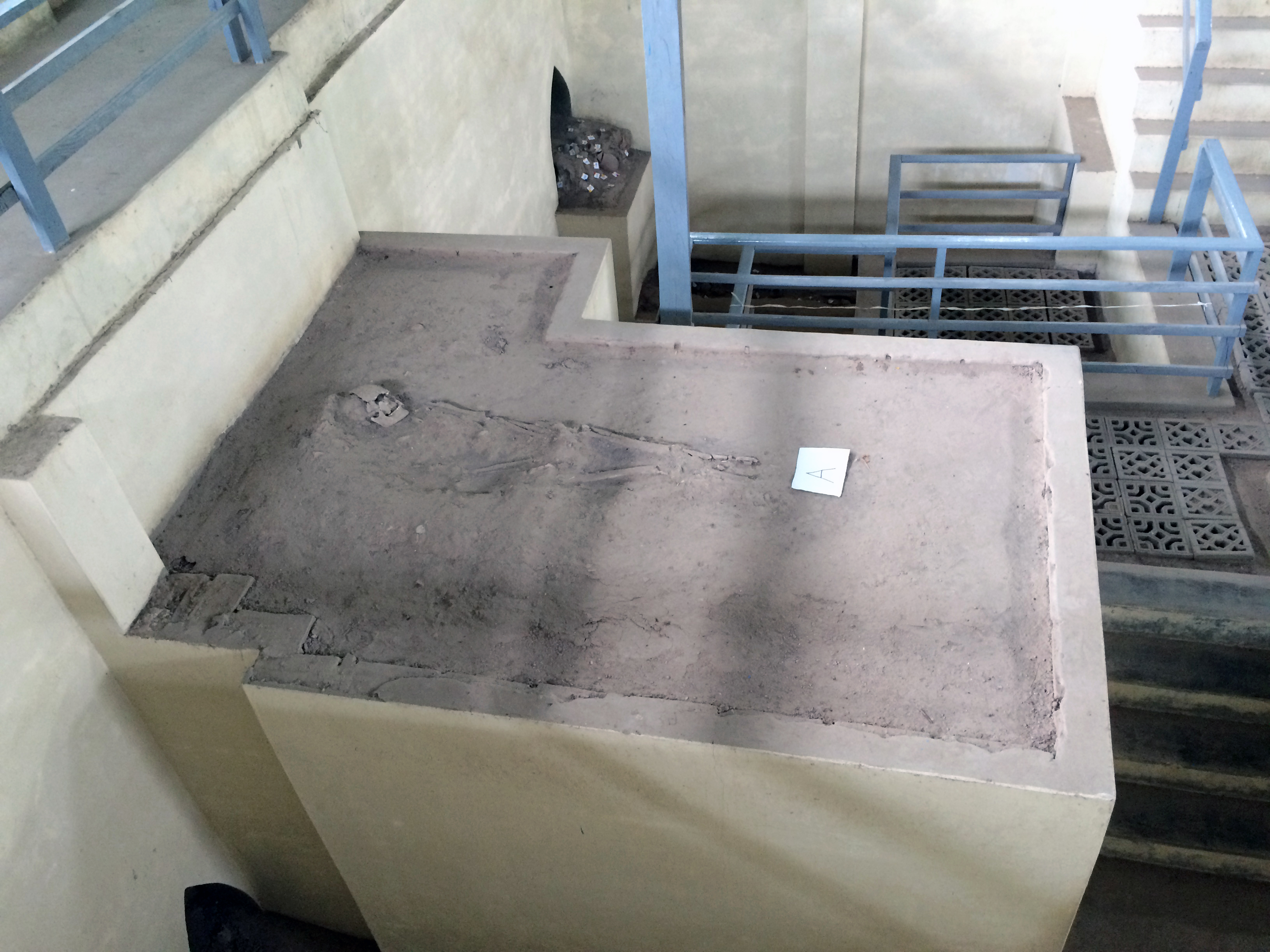
An excavated graveyard

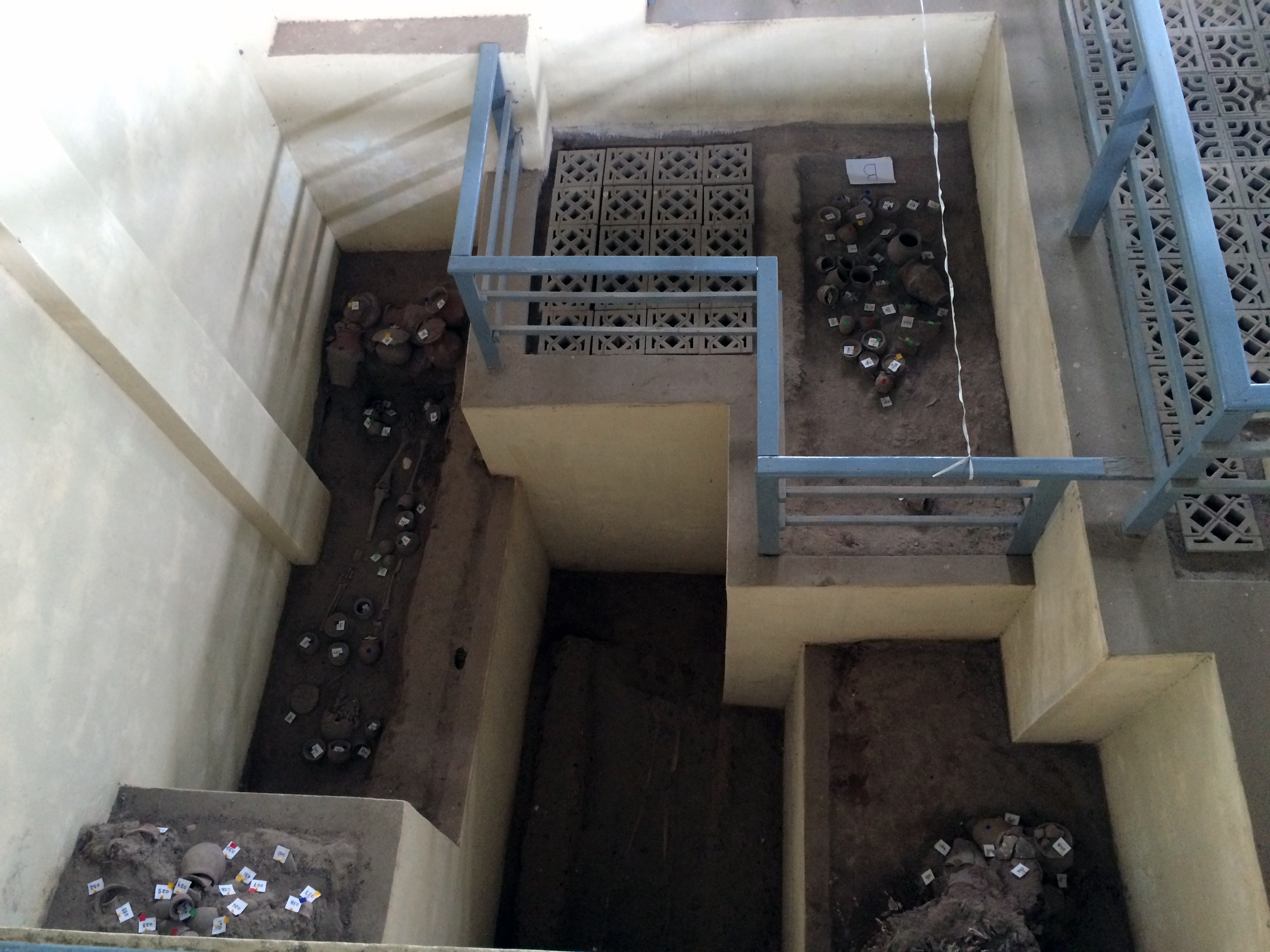
An excavated graveyard at Hanlin

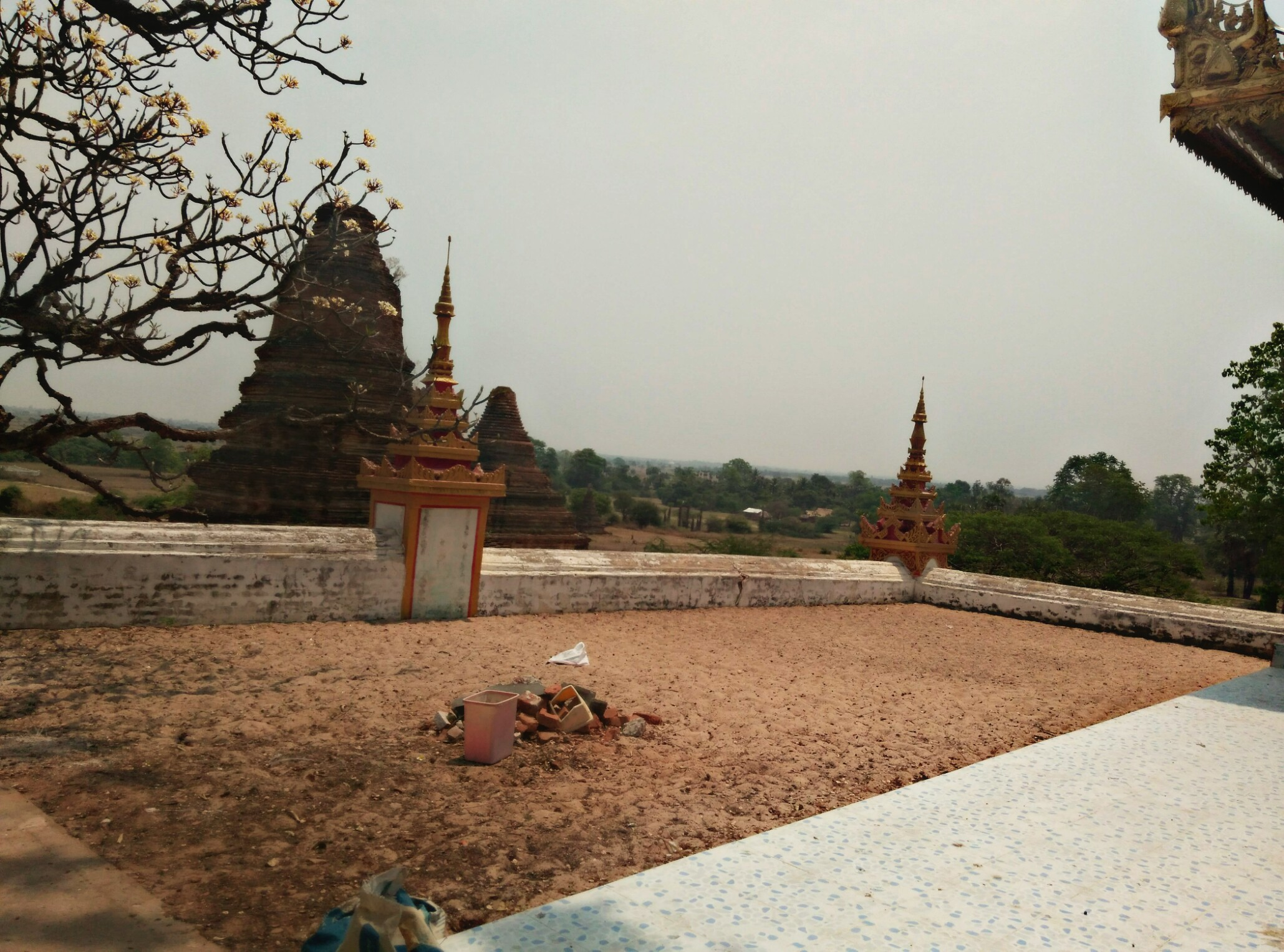
Pagodas in Hanlin

== See also ==
Halin Taungbo

== Bibliography ==
- Richmond, Simon; Bush, Austin (1 June 2014). Lonely Planet Myanmar (Burma). Lonely Planet Publications. ISBN 978-1-74360-019-1.
