= Innlegyi =

Innlegyi is a village in Kanbalu Township, Kanbalu District, Sagiang Division, Myanmar.

It is 9 miles (14 km) from Kanbalu, and from the nearest main road.

There are more than 800 households in the village with more than seven household members. Most of the residents are farmers, growing peas, beans, and maize for sale, and rice for their own food.

There is a middle school in the village. There is no electricity or water supply, and most residents use solar energy, and use rain water for irrigation. Most residents use bicycles for transportation.

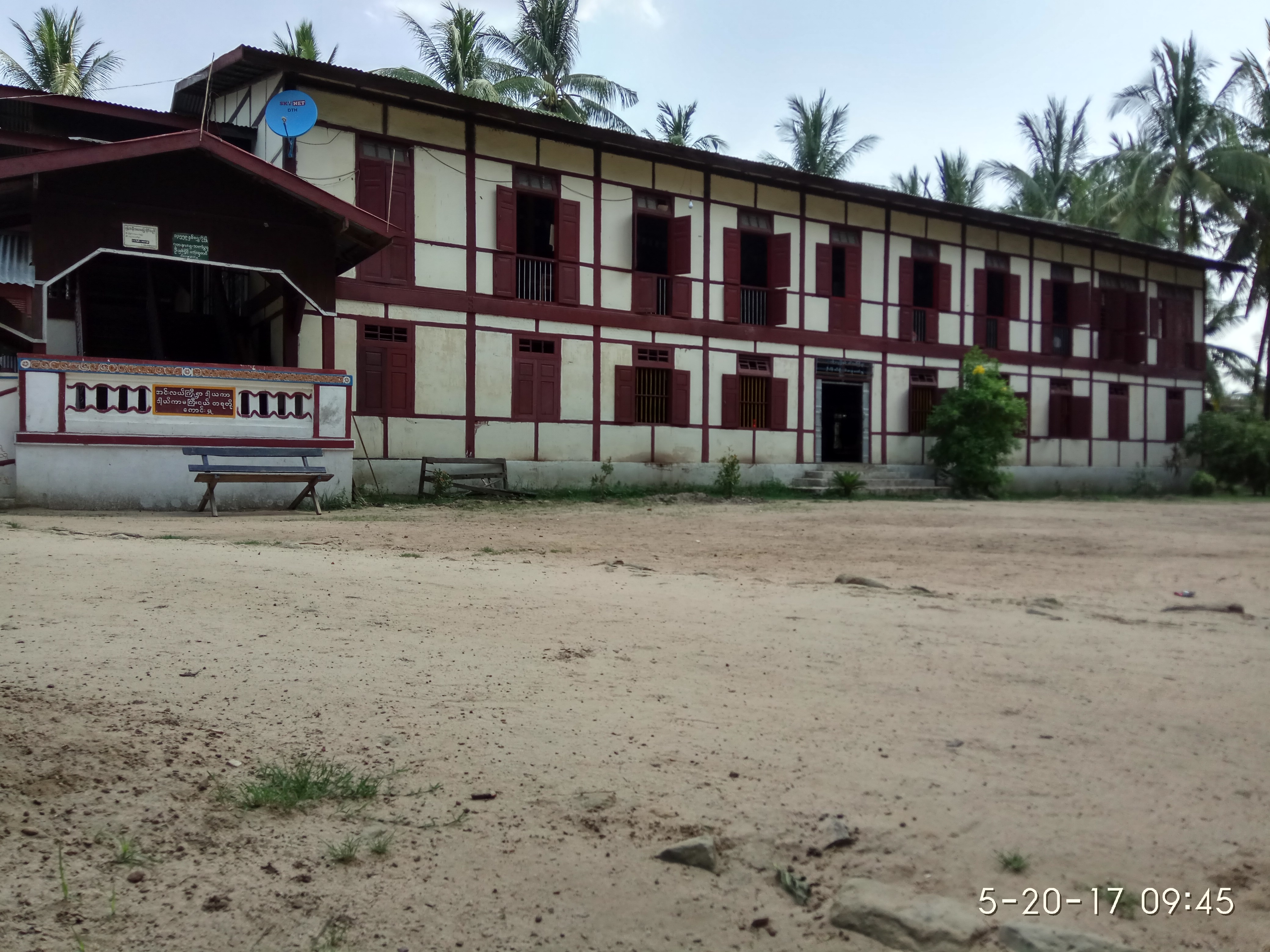

Most of the residents are Buddhist. There is a monastery in the middle of the village, Atulamharmaung Monastery, under the supervision of Sayayataw U Karrunika.
