= Shein Makkar Monastery =

Buddhist monastery in Sagaing Region, Myanmar

- ရှိန်းမကားတောရကျောင်း
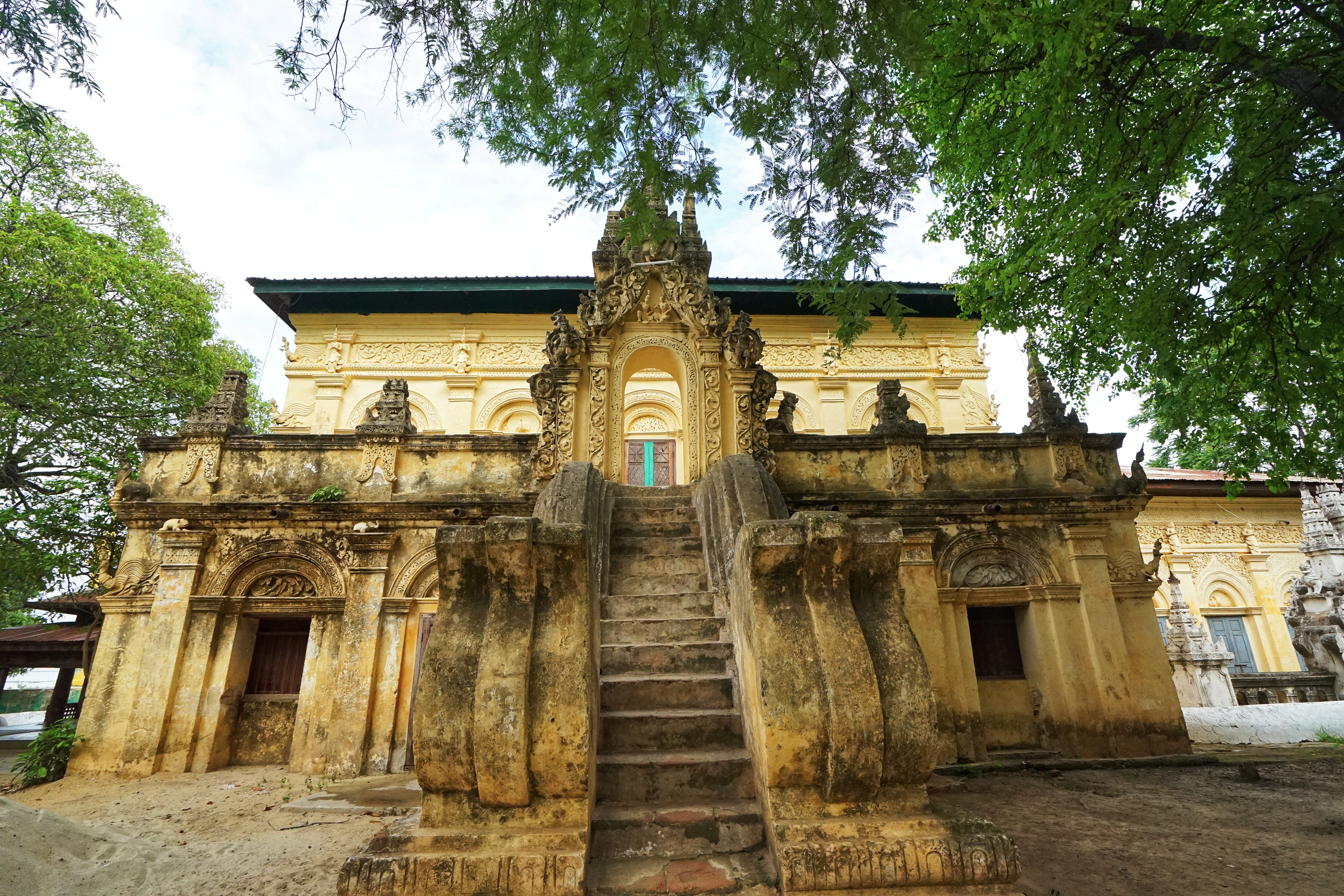

- Location within Myanmar

Religion
- Affiliation: Theravada Buddhism

Location
- Location: Wetlet, Sagaing Region
- Country: Myanmar
- Interactive map of Shein Makkar Monastery
- Coordinates: 22.268066°N 95.983970°E

Architecture
- Founder: King Mindon
- Completed: 1862; 164 years ago

Shein Makkar Monastery (Burmese: ရှိန်းမကားတောရကျောင်း) is a historic Buddhist monastery in Wetlet, Sagaing Region, Myanmar that was donated and built in 1862 by King Mindon.

== Location ==
Shein Makkar is located about 26 miles (42 km) away from Mandalay at Wetlet Township in Sagaing Region.

== History ==
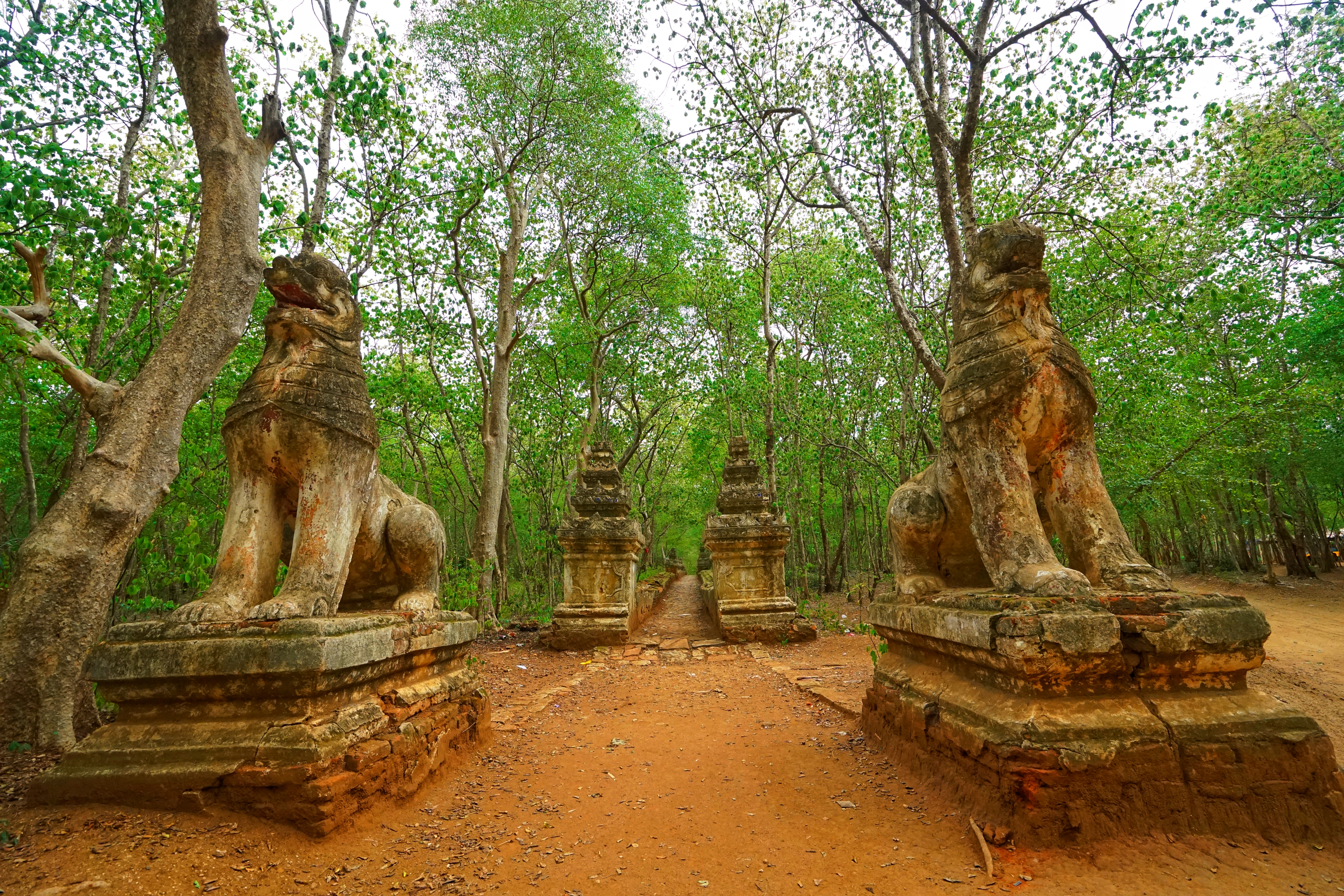
The gate of Shein Makkar

When King Mindon toured the country in 1862, he arrived at the Shein Makkar and had a chance to pay homage to Sayadaw U Jāgara, the coming Shwegyin Sayadaw originated one. King Mindon donated and built monasteries and buildings there in the forest with stone caves where Sayadaw meditated and old religious buildings could be observed as origin as its ancient times infrastructure.

== Wildlife sanctuary ==
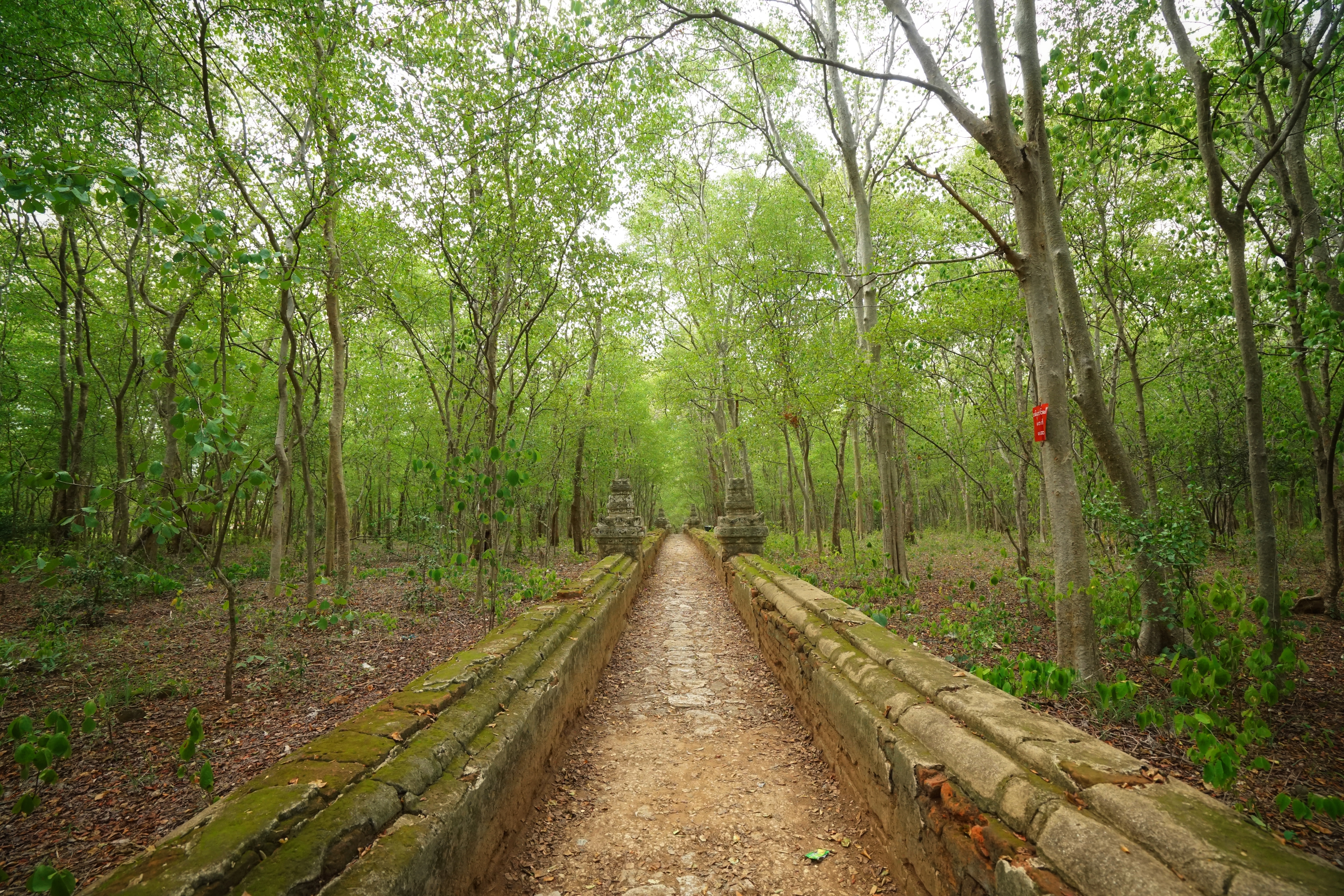
Shein Makkar sanctuary

King Mindon was designated the Shein Makkar forest at Burma's first wildlife sanctuary in 1862. The sanctuary spans 334 acres and is home to rare flora and fauna, including golden deer, spotted deer, rabbits and different species of birds. The area is managed by the Ministry of Natural Resources and Environmental Conservation.

== See also ==
- Shein Makkar village
