= Budalin =

Budalin ဘုတလင် Butalin
- Town
- Location in Burma
- Coordinates: 22°23′23″N 95°08′32″E
- Country: Myanmar
- Region: Sagaing Region
- District: Monywa District
- Township: Budalin Township
- Time zone: UTC+6.30 (MST)

Budalin is a town in Budalin Township, Monywa District, Sagaing Division in Myanmar (Burma). As the administrative center of Budalin Township, it serves as a vital center for local governance and is connected by road and rail to neighboring areas, including Monywa, Tabayin, Khin-U, and Ye-U, via a bridge across the Mu River.

== Geography ==
Budalin is strategically located within the Sagaing Region, which has been recognized as a stronghold of resistance against military rule. Its geographical location makes it a frequent target for military operations.

== Recent events and killings ==
On October 17, 2024, reports emerged of intensified military actions in Budalin Township, leading to the deaths of at least 25 civilians over a 10-day period amid escalating atrocities. Military operations have specifically targeted villages such as Myauk Kyi, Sipar, Thayaw Taw, Saing Byin Lay, and Kyauk Oh Myauk, resulting in significant destruction and displacement.

In Sipar village, reports indicate that at least 300 homes were destroyed, and accounts describe extreme violence, including dismemberment and torture inflicted on innocent civilians, who were not rebels or members of ethnic armed groups. Ko Moetauk, the person in charge of Sipar Village, was interviewed by Khit Thit Media regarding the brutal killing of six people by the Myanmar Army. He recounted the horrific acts, stating, "We also saw that the tongue was sticking out in the middle... After cutting off the person's body, they put it in their mouth. This is pretty mean. It's absolutely filthy." The Budalin People’s Defence Force (PDF) has condemned these acts as inhumane.

Observers suggest that these military actions aim to intimidate the local population; however, they may inadvertently strengthen local resistance. Analysts argue that the lack of international response may encourage the military to escalate such operations across the Sagaing Region.
