= Sadaung =

Sadaung (ဆားတောင်) is a common town name in the Sagaing Region and the Mandalay Region of Burma (Myanmar). It may refer to:

- Mandalay Region
  - Sadaung, Natogyi Township, Myingyan District
  - Sadaung, Pyawbwe Township, Yamethin District
- Sagaing Region
  - Sadaung, Sagaing Township, Sagaing District
  - Sadaung I, Wetlet Township, Shwebo District
  - Sadaung II, Wetlet Township, Shwebo District
