= Soe Win Tun =

Burmese politician

Member of the Sagaing Region Hluttaw
- Incumbent
- Assumed office 3 February 2016
- Constituency: Wetlet Township № 2
- Majority: 46,399 votes

Personal details
- Born: 1 May 1990 (age 36) Wetlet, Sagaing Region, Myanmar
- Party: National League for Democracy
- Parent(s): San Tint (father); Thein Nwet Win (mother)
- Education: Shwebo University B.A(History)

Soe Win Tun (Burmese: စိုးဝင်းထွန်း, born 1 May 1990) is a Burmese politician who currently serves as a Sagaing Region Hluttaw member of parliament for Wetlet Township № 2 Constituency. He is a member of the National League for Democracy and the youngest MP of Sagaing Region Hluttaw.

== Early life ==
Tun was born on 1 May 1990 in Wetlet, Sagaing Region, Myanmar. He graduated from Shwebo University with a B.A. in history. He had served as the charge of NLD Wetlet Township Youth.

== Political career ==
Tun is a member of the National League for Democracy. He was elected as a Sagaing Region Hluttaw MP, winning a majority of 46,399 votes, from Wetlet Township № 2 parliamentary constituency.
