= Sadaung I, Wetlet Township =

Sadaung ဆားတောင်
- Village
- Location in Burma.
- Coordinates: 22°25′45″N 95°49′56″E
- Country: Burma
- Region: Sagaing Region
- District: Shwebo District
- Township: Wetlet
- Elevation: 75 m (246 ft)
- Time zone: UTC+6.30 (MST)

Sadaung is a village in Shwebo District in south-western Sagaing Region in Burma (Myanmar). It is in the Mu River drainage basin. It is located 2.5 km south-west of Halin Taungbo, in the foothills of the Mawdaw Mountains.
