= Kyunhla =

- Town
- Location in Burma
- Coordinates: 23°21′0″N 95°19′0″E
- Country: Myanmar
- Division: Sagaing Region
- District: Kanbalu District
- Township: Kyunhla Township
- Elevation: 535 ft (163 m)

Population
  - Religions: Buddhism
- Time zone: UTC+6.30 (MST)

Kyunhla (Burmese: ကျွန်းလှ) is a town in Kanbalu District, Sagaing Division in north-western Burma (Myanmar) about 70 kilometres east of Mawlaik. It is the administrative center of Kyunhla Township.
