= Ywa Zin =

Ywa Zin Model Village ရွာစဉ် စံပြကျေးရွာ Yazin
- Village
- Location in Burma
- Coordinates: 22°46′N 95°37′E
- Country: Burma
- Region: Sagaing Region
- District: Shwebo District
- Township: Khin-U Township
- Model Village: Ywa Zin
- Time zone: UTC+6.30 (MST)

Ywa Zin Model Village is a village in Khin-U Township in Shwebo District in the Sagaing Division of Burma. The principal village is Ywa Zin.

== About ==
Ywazin Model Village is a big village which contains about 1200 houses. It has a population of about 10000. The Basic Education High School (Branch of Khin-U) and Tai' Ne (administrative unit of Burma) Hospital are in the South Part. The villagers are Traditional Buddhists and there are seven monasteries. Most villagers are farmers who grow rice, sugar-cane, various kind of pea and sesame in the rainy season.
