= Sadaung, Pyawbwe Township =

Village in Mandalay Region, Burma

Sadaung ဆားတောင်
- Town
- Location in Burma.
- Coordinates: 20°40′45″N 95°59′09″E
- Country: Burma
- Region: Mandalay Region
- District: Yamethin
- Township: Pyawbwe
- Elevation: 178 m (584 ft)
- Time zone: UTC+6.30 (MST)

Sadaung is a village in Yamethin District in the south-central part of the Mandalay Region in Myanmar. It is located south-east of Yindaw just west of Route 1 (formerly known as the “Main Trunk Road”), north-west of Pyawbwe, Pyawbwe Township.
