= Budalin Township =

- Township
- Location in Myanmar
- Coordinates: 22°22′N 95°08′E
- Country: Myanmar
- Region: Sagaing Region
- District: Monywa District
- Capital: Budalin
- Time zone: UTC+6.30 (MST)

Budalin Township is a township in Monywa District in the Sagaing Division of Myanmar. The principal town is Budalin.

Bronze Age human remains and artifacts were discovered in Budalin township in 1998–99. There is now a museum in Nyaung Kan village showing some of the artifacts and skeletons.

Twintaung area of Budalin is famous for its natural spirulina. 150 tons of dried spirulina per year was produced from it since 1988, but its yield declined in 2014.

== Recent events and massacre ==
On October 17, 2024, reports emerged of severe military action in Budalin Township, resulting in the deaths of at least 25 civilians over a span of 10 days amidst escalating violence. This area, part of the Sagaing Region, has long been recognized as a center of resistance, and its strategic location has placed it under increasing pressure since the military coup, drawing heightened attention from the Tatmadaw, Myanmar's Armed Forces.

As the administrative heart of Budalin Township, Budalin town serves as a vital link between key neighboring areas like Monywa, Tabayin, Khin-U, and Ye-U, connected by road and rail across the Mu River. Recently, military operations have intensified in this region, targeting several villages—Myauk Kyi, Sipar, Thayaw Taw, Saing Byin Lay, and Kyauk Oh Myauk—resulting in significant destruction and displacement.

One village, Sipar, was particularly hard-hit, with reports indicating that over 300 homes were destroyed. Eyewitness accounts detail horrifying incidents of brutality, with innocent civilians—who were not rebels or members of the ethnic armed groups—subjected to extreme violence, including dismemberment and torture. Ko Moetauk, the person in charge of Sipar village, was interviewed by Khit Thit Media about the brutal killing of six individuals by the Myanmar Army. He describe the graphic violence inflicted upon the victims, stating, "We also saw that the tongue was sticking out in the middle... After cutting off the person's body, they put it in their mouth. This is pretty mean. It's absolutely filthy." The Budalin People’s Defence Force (PDF) has condemned these acts as inhumane, aimed specifically at non-combatants.

Some observers believe these military actions are intended to suppress the spirit of resistance among the local population. However, there is a growing sense that the opposite effect may be taking hold—that this crackdown could fuel even stronger local defiance. Analysts suggest that the military’s continued escalation, partly due to the limited response from the international community, may further destabilize the Sagaing Region.
