= Sittaung, Sagaing =

Sittaung စစ်တောင်း Sittaw
- Location of Sittaung, Myanmar
- Coordinates: 24°10′N 94°35′E
- Country: Myanmar
- Region: Sagaing Region
- District: Mawlaik
- Township: Paungbyin
- Time zone: UTC+6.30 (MST)

Sittaung (Burmese: စစ်တောင်း, pronounced [sɪʔ táʊ̯ɰ̃]) is a town in Paungbyin Township, Mawlaik District, in the Sagaing Region of Burma (Myanmar) on the right bank of the Chindwin River. There is a highway running west to the Indian border which provides Tamu with access to transport on the Chindwin. This road was laid out in 1887 by troops under Major General John James Hood Gordon to better link Manipur with Upper Burma.
