= Paungbyin =

Paungbyin ဖောင်းြင် Pyaungbin, Phaungbyin
- Town
- Location in Burma
- Coordinates: 24°16′06″N 94°48′54″E
- Country: Myanmar
- Region: Sagaing Region
- District: Mawlaik
- Township: Paungbyin Township
- Elevation: 146 m (479 ft)
- Time zone: UTC+6.30 (MST)

Paungbyin, also known as Pyaungbin or Phaungbyin, is a town in Mawlaik District, Sagaing Division, of Myanmar, on the Chindwin River. It is the principal town of Paungbyin Township.
