= Sadaung II, Wetlet Township =

Sadaung ဆားတောင်
- Village
- Location in Burma.
- Coordinates: 22°19′17″N 95°55′28″E
- Country: Burma
- Region: Sagaing Region
- District: Shwebo District
- Township: Wetlet
- Elevation: 76 m (249 ft)
- Time zone: UTC+6.30 (MST)

Sadaung is a village in Shwebo District in south-western Sagaing Region in Burma (Myanmar). It lies in the drainage of the Irrawaddy River. It is located about halfway between the villages of Yonbingon and Ywathit, 7 km due west of Ywatha.
