= Aingshe =

- Location in Burma
- Coordinates: 22°30′0″N 95°11′0″E
- Country: Burma
- Division: Sagaing Region
- Township: Budalin Township

Population (2005)
  - Religions: Buddhism
- Time zone: UTC+6.30 (MST)

Aingshe is a village in the Sagaing Region of north-west Myanmar. It lies in Budalin Township in the Tamu District.
