= Aingdo =

- Location in Burma
- Coordinates: 20°38′0″N 95°49′0″E
- Country: Burma
- Division: Mandalay Region
- Township: Pyawbwe Township

Population (2005)
  - Religions: Buddhism
- Time zone: UTC+6.30 (MST)

Aingdo is a village in the Mandalay Region of north-west Myanmar. It lies in Pyawbwe Township in the Yamethin District.

== See also ==
- List of cities, towns and villages in Burma: A
