= Shwebo Township =

Shwebo Township ရွှေဘိုမြို့နယ်
- Township
- location in Shwebo district

- location in Sagaing region
- Coordinates: 22°34′N 96°42′E
- Country: Myanmar
- Region: Sagaing Region
- District: Shwebo
- Capital: Shwebo
- Time zone: UTC+6.30 (MST)

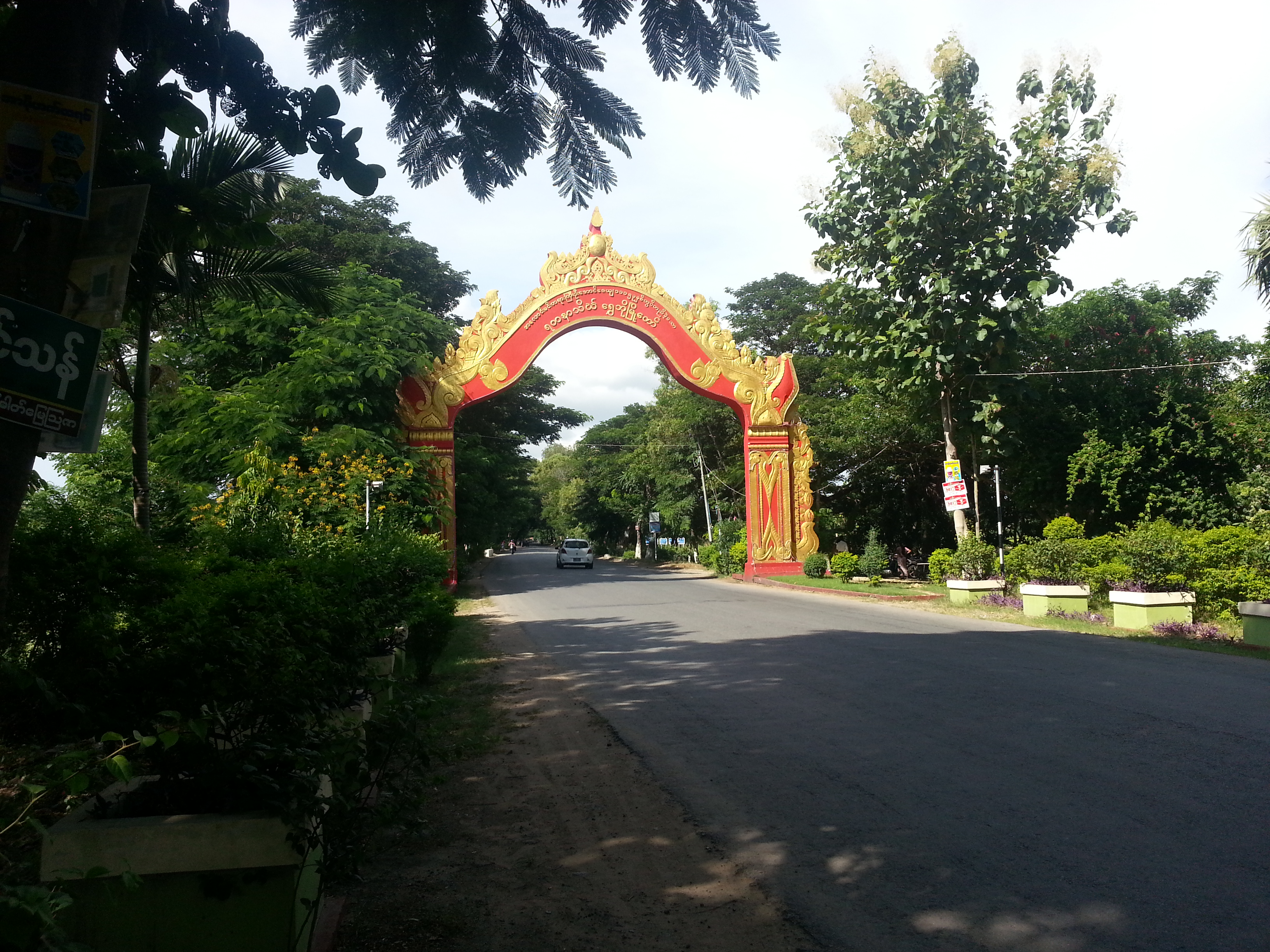
Welcome sign of Shwebo town

Shwebo Township (Burmese: ရွှေဘိုမြို့နယ်) is a township of Shwebo District in the Myanmar's Sagaing Region. It is located on the plains between the Mu River and the Ayeyarwady River. The ancient palace of King Alaungmintaya is there. Its administrative seat is the city of Shwebo. As of 2014, it had a population of 266,807. 53.7% of its population was male while 46.3% was female.

== Geography ==
Shwebo township is bounded on the east by the Ayeyarwady River, across which is Singu Township of Mandalay District in Mandalay Region. To the north of Shwebo township is Khin-U Township, to the south is Wetlet Township, and to the west is Tabayin Township.

Among the many villages and wards (village census tracts) in Shwebo township are Seik Khun Village, Hsin Inn (Sin-Inn) Village, Htoogyi Village, Khuntaungnge Village, Kyar Village, Myinchin Village, Pann Hlaing Village, Tazai Village, and Thanbayachan Village, NyaungPinTha Village, Late Chin Village, Pan Yan Village, Hla Taw Village, Tha Lone Village, Myin Sie Village, Zee Kone Lay Village, Nyaung Gan Village, Da Gan Thar Village, Thit Cho Bin Village, Ywar Mitther Village, Min Gone Village, Lone Taw Village, Zee BYU Gone village, Patetaw Village, Kaww Village

== Economy ==
Recent irrigation projects have significantly increased rice production in the township, allowing three crops per year. Shwebo focuses on the maintenance of their crop system.
