= Ywatha, Wetlet Township =

Ywatha
- Village
- Location in Burma
- Coordinates: 22°19′49″N 95°58′44″E
- Country: Burma
- Region: Sagaing Region
- District: Shwebo District
- Township: Wetlet
- Elevation: 47 m (154 ft)
- Time zone: UTC+6.30 (MST)

Ywatha is a village in Wetlet Township, Shwebo District, in south-western Sagaing Region in Burma (Myanmar), on the right (west) bank of the Irrawaddy River.
