= Myint Thein (politician) =

Burmese politician

- မြင့်သိန်း

Member of the Pyithu Hluttaw
- Constituency: Wetlet Township

Personal details
- Born: 25 December 1960 (age 65) Hanlin, Myanmar
- Party: National League for Democracy
- Spouse: Pway Cho
- Relations: Kyaw (father); Khin Hlaing (mother)
- Children: 2
- Education: M.Sc (Zoology)
- Occupation: Politician

Myint Thein (Burmese: မြင့်သိန်း) is a Burmese politician who currently serves as a Pyithu Hluttaw MP for Wetlet Township.

== Political career ==
He is a member of the National League for Democracy. In the 2015 Myanmar general election and 2020 Myanmar general election, he was elected as a Pyithu Hluttaw MP and elected representative from Wetlet Township parliamentary constituency.
