= Yindaw =

- Village
- Location in Myanmar
- Coordinates: 20°43′0″N 95°56′0″E
- Country: Myanmar
- Division: Mandalay Region
- District: Meiktila District
- Township: Meiktila Township

Yindaw is a small town and former township in Pyawbwe Township, Mandalay Region, Myanmar. It was historically the seat of a provincial governor.

== Geography ==
Yindaw is located northwest of Pyawbwe and south of Meiktila. It is partly surrounded by a moat and ruined wall. It is also surrounded by a "thorny hedgerow" and has a village gate.

== History ==
The king Anawrahta supposedly once visited Yindaw and had an irrigation canal dug through the area, which became the lake that exists today. During this period, Yindaw seems to have been a garrison town along with Yamethin, Pyawbwe, and Meiktila. It was tasked with supplying a force of 400 men for military service.

The name "Yindaw" appears in the Sa Kyo Paya Hla inscription of 1192, which may be the earliest contemporary epigraphic reference to the town.

In 1402, Minkhaung I appointed Minmaha, grandson of Yazathura of Pinle, as myoza of Yindaw, along with a gift of 70 war elephants. Later, after the death of Mahabyauk, the king appointed one Pauk Hla as myoza of Yindaw along with a gift of 50 elephants. He was succeeded by Sitha, who was in Yindaw in 1428.

During the Naungyan period, Yindaw was part of the territory governed by Nawrahta Min Saw. It was later part of the revolt of Min Ye U-Zana in 1628, and was affected by political instability.

In 1679, when Minye Kyaw Htin made a list of towns and villages under his rule, Yindaw was listed as a kyeitsu (non-crown-service) town.

During the Konbaung period, Yindaw served as a military outpost due to its location in a contested region. In the census roll of 1783, under king Badon, Yindaw was listed as having 521 athi (commoner) households and 491 crown service households (which included groups like horsemen from the Myin Zu Gyi, Myanmar Myin, and Shwe Pyi Yan Aung cavalry groups; and musketeers from the Nat Su group; as well as groups like the ngwei gun daw (silver tax collectors) as well as Muslims and Portuguese).

Saltpetre was extracted at Yindaw during the Konbaung period, and then made into gunpowder. The town also lay on the main trade route from Meiktila to Pyawbwe during that time. Yindaw was the fiefdom of Yindaw Ma Lay, a court dancer during the reign of King Thibaw.

In general, in the Konbaung period, Yindaw Township's highest-ranking official was the provincial governor (whose title was variously myoza, myowun, or myo-oat), who was responsible for presiding over civil and criminal cases, checking and standardising weights and measures, levying taxes, and also carrying out whatever orders came from the central authorities. Several governors are attested during the Konbaung period: the myoza Thiri Su Sandra Dewi in 1783, the myowun Maha Min Khaung Tha Manta Raza in 1866, the myo-oat Min Htin Thiha Kyaw Khaung in 1878, and the myoza Mingyi Thiri Maha Zeya Gamani in 1885.

Under the provincial governor was the town headman (myo thugyi) of Yindaw, and subordinate to the myo thugyi were the village headmen (thugyi) for the various villages in the township. Several myo thugyi are attested for Yindaw in the 1800s: Nga Kyaw San Hla in 1810, Ko Ohn Khaing in 1869, Shwe Taung Eindra Thura in 1878, and Nga Loke in 1880. Another unnamed myo thugyi is attested in 1838 as part of a dispute with the myo thugyi of Meiktila, when both headmen claimed the village of Shan De as part of their own jurisdiction.

As of 1891, the entire township of Yindaw had a total population of 37,890.

Before Yamethin District was created 1893, Yindaw was part of Meiktila District. With the creation of Yamethin District, Yindaw was split off from Meiktila to become one of three townships in Yamethin District, along with Pyawbwe and Yamethin. As of 1901, Yindaw Township's borders were with Meiktila District on the north, Magway Division on the west and south, and Pyawbwe Township on the east.

At the turn of the 20th century, Yindaw was described as having two distinct parts, one of which was inhabited by descendants of people who had supposedly immigrated from India in 1708. They had supposedly originated as political refugees who had been followers of a Mughal crown prince who had fled to Arakan after his brother imprisoned their father "Arlangiri" and seized the throne. They were then allowed to settle in several places in Myanmar in groups of 7 families, in each case on a new designated site just outside a pre-existing town. Besides Yindaw, similar groups settled at several other towns: Taung-Ngu, Yamethin, Nyaungyan, Meiktila, Myedu, Ngayane, Kawthanthi, and Sibatbya.

By 1910, Yindaw had been merged into Pyawbwe Township.
