= Halin Taungbo =

Hanlin
- City
- Location in Burma.
- Coordinates: 22°26′56″N 95°49′01″E
- Country: Burma
- Region: Sagaing Region
- District: Shwebo District
- Township: Wetlet
- Elevation: 81 m (266 ft)
- Time zone: UTC+6.30 (MST)

Hanlin is a city in Shwebo District in south-western Sagaing Region in Burma (Myanmar). It is located in the Mu River drainage in the foothills on the western slope of the Mawdaw Mountains.

Hanlin is associated with several other villages, Hanlin Taungngo, Hanlin Pindale, Halin Twinma, etc., that are sometimes referred to as the town of Hanlin.
