= Taze, Myanmar =

Taze တန့်ဆည် Lan Son
- Town
- Location in Myanmar
- Coordinates: 22°56′40″N 95°22′25″E
- Country: Myanmar
- Region: Sagaing Region
- District: Ye-U District
- Township: Taze Township

Area
  - Total: 1.09 sq mi (2.8 km^{2})

Population (2023)
  - Total: 2,931
- Time zone: UTC+6.30 (MMT)

Taze (Burmese: တန့်ဆည်, Burmese pronunciation: [də.zɛ̀]) is a town in Ye-U District, Sagaing Region in Myanmar. The town is the administrative center of Taze Township and is itself further subdivided into 4 urban wards.
