= Mawlaik District =

- District
- Coordinates: 23°48′N 94°39′E
- Country: Myanmar
- Region: Sagaing Region
- No. of Townships: 2
- Capital: Mawlaik
- Time zone: UTC+6.30 (MMT)

Mawlaik District (formerly Upper Chindwin District) is a district in central Sagaing Region in north-west Myanmar. Its administrative center is the town of Mawlaik.

== Townships ==
Townships of Mawlaik district

Mawlaik
Paungbyin

Mawlaik district consists of 2 townships.

- Mawlaik Township
- Paungbyin Township

== Characteristics ==
The district consists of just two townships, Mawlaik and Paungbyin. In addition to Mawlaik, the major towns are Kindat (Kintat), Kaunggwe, Khawe, Inntaw, Lawtha, Ontha (Ohnthar), Pantha, Paungbyin (Phaung Pyin or Phonpin), Sittaung, Tatkon, and Yuwa. Major transportation is along the Chindwin River. In 2006 the Mawlaik-Kalewa Road was completed.

== Borders ==
Mawlaik District is bordered by:

- Hkamti District to the north,
- Tamu District to the west,
- Kale (Kalemyo) District to the south, and
- Shwebo District and Katha District to the east.
