= Ye-U Township =

- Township
- location in Ye-U district

- location in Sagaing region
- Coordinates: 22°46′N 95°26′E
- Country: Myanmar
- Region: Sagaing Region
- District: Ye-U District
- Capital: Ye-U
- Time zone: UTC+6.30 (MMT)

Ye-U Township is a township in Ye-U District in the Sagaing Region of Myanmar. In 2022, the township was split from its former Shwebo District to form part of the new Ye-U District. The township is located in the north-western part of the country. The principal town is Ye-U.
