= Wetlet =

Wetlet ဝက်လက်
- Town
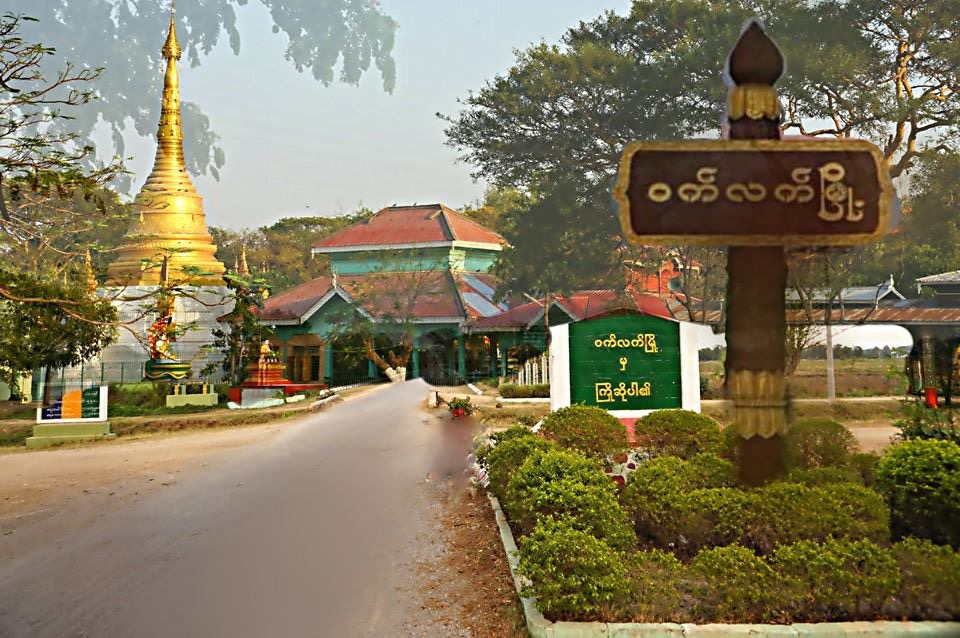

- Location in Burma
- Coordinates: 22°22′28″N 95°47′28″E
- Country: Myanmar
- Region: Sagaing Region
- District: Shwebo District
- Township: Wetlet Township
- Elevation: 84 m (276 ft)
- Time zone: UTC+6.30 (MST)

Wetlet (Burmese: ဝက်လက်) is a town in Shwebo District, Sagaing Region in Myanmar. It is the administrative seat for Wetlet Township. The town of Wetlet is located in the center of Wetlet Township, about halfway between the Mu River and the Irrawaddy. Wetlet is on the main Burmese north-south railroad between Sagaing and Shwebo.

== History ==
Wetlet originated as a staging area during the building of the railroad in the late 1800s. A well was dug to provide water for the steam engines, and a small market developed around Wetlet station. Because of its central location, and direct rail access, Wetlet became the leading town in the area.
