= Mawlaik Township =

- Township
- Location in Mawlaik district (in red)

- Location in Sagaing region

- Location in Burma
- Coordinates: 23°38′N 94°25′E
- Country: Burma (Myanmar)
- Region: Sagaing Region
- District: Mawlaik District
- Capital: Mawlaik
- Time zone: UTC+6.30 (MST)

Mawlaik Township is a township in Mawlaik District in the Sagaing Division of western Burma. The principal town is Mawlaik.
