= Chatthin Wildlife Sanctuary =

- IUCN category IV (habitat/species management area)
- Location within Myanmar
- Location: Kanbalu Township, Sagaing Region, Myanmar
- Coordinates: 23°36′N 95°32′E
- Area: 260.07 km^{2} (100.41 sq mi)
- Established: 1941
- Governing body: Forest Department

Chatthin Wildlife Sanctuary is a protected area in Myanmar's Sagaing Region that was established in 1941, stretching over an area of 260.07 km^{2} (100.41 sq mi). It is located in Kanbalu Township.

== Fauna ==
Chatthin Wildlife Sanctuary provides habitat for Eld's deer. The Indochinese leopard was considered almost locally extinct by 2000.
