= Taze Township =

Taze Township တန့်ဆည်မြို့နယ်
- Township
- location of township in Ye-U district

- location in Sagaing region
- Coordinates: 23.051°N 95.433°E
- Country: Myanmar
- Region: Sagaing Region
- District: Ye-U District

Area
  - Total: 716.34 sq mi (1,855.3 km^{2})

Population
  - Total: 198,019
  - Ethnicities: Bamar
  - Religions: Buddhism
- Time zone: UTC+6.30 (MMT)

Taze township (Burmese: တန့်ဆည်မြို့နယ်) is a township in Ye-U District, Sagaing Region, Myanmar. The township has only one town- the principal town of Taze, which has four urban wards. The township also has 272 villages grouped into 57 village tracts. The township is very homogenous with 99.98% of the population being of the Bamar ethnicity, and 99.04% following Buddhism.

The township has sizeable Pyusawhti militia presence, with military presence increasing in 2024 during the course of the current phase of the Myanmar civil war. Earlier that year, Pyusawhti outposts had been sieged by the People's Defence Force resistance troops.
