= Paungbyin Township =

- Township
- Location in Mawlaik district (in red)

- Location in Sagaing region

- Location in Burma
- Coordinates: 24°16′N 94°49′E
- Country: Burma
- Region: Sagaing Region
- District: Mawlaik District
- Capital: Paungbyin
- Time zone: UTC+6.30 (MST)

Paungbyin Township is a township in Mawlaik District in the Sagaing Division of Burma. The principal town is Paungbyin.
