= Kyunhla Township =

- Township
- Location in Kanbalu district

- Location in Sagaing region

- Location in Burma
- Coordinates: 23°21′N 95°19′E
- Country: Burma
- Region: Sagaing Region
- District: Kanbalu District
- Capital: Kyunhla
- Time zone: UTC+6.30 (MST)

Kyunhla Township is a township in Kanbalu District in the Sagaing Division of north-western Burma. The principal town is Kyunhla.
