= Pyawbwe, Pyawbwe Township =

Populated place in Mandalay region, Myanmar

Pyawbwe ပျော်ဘွယ်
- Town
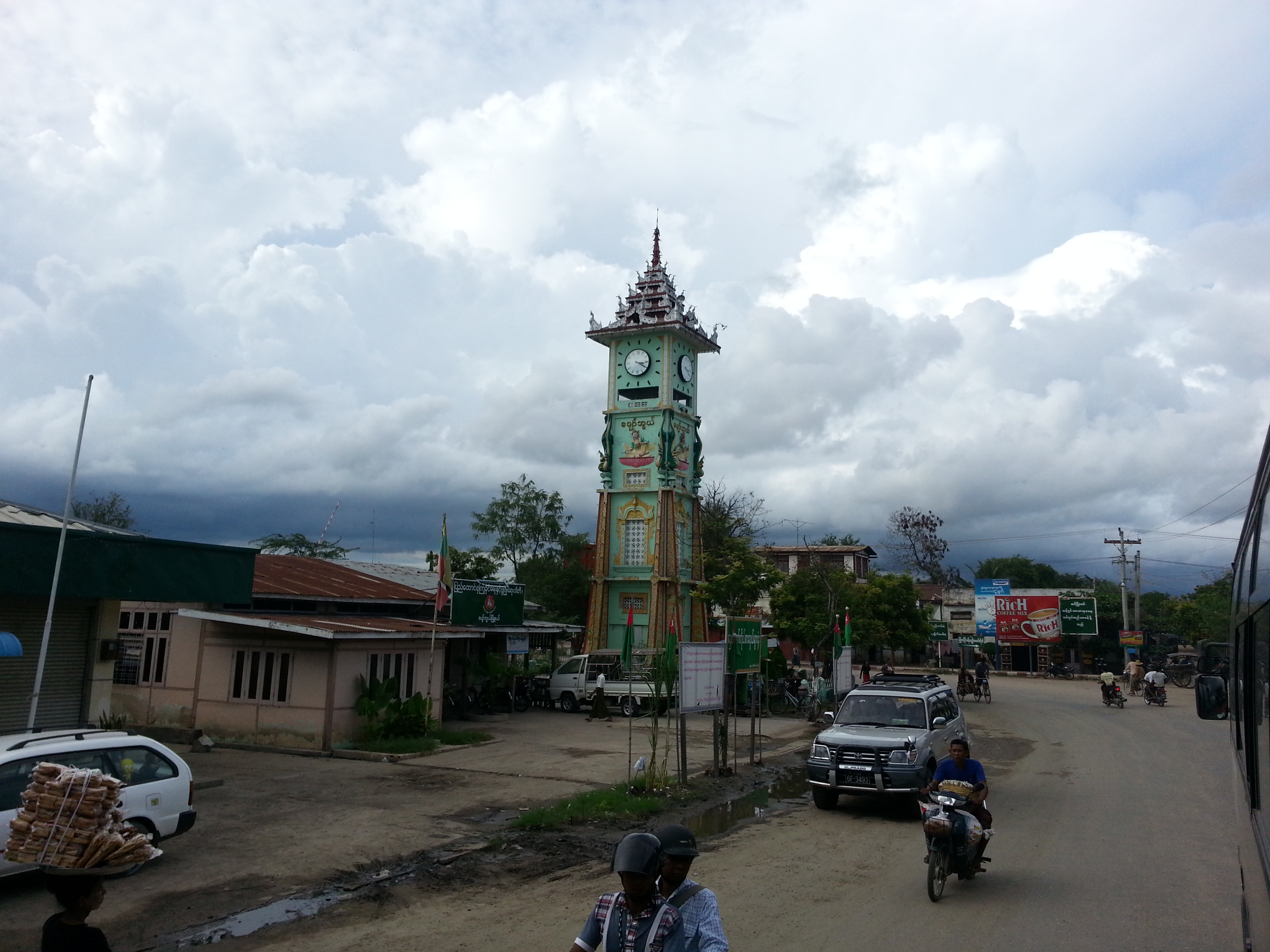

- Location in Burma
- Coordinates: 20°35′0″N 96°4′0″E
- Country: Myanmar
- Division: Mandalay
- District: Yamethin District
- Township: Pyawbwe Township

Population (2005)
  - Religions: Buddhism
- Time zone: UTC+06:30 (MST)

Pyawbwe (Burmese: ပျော်ဘွယ်) is a town in the Mandalay Division of central Myanmar.

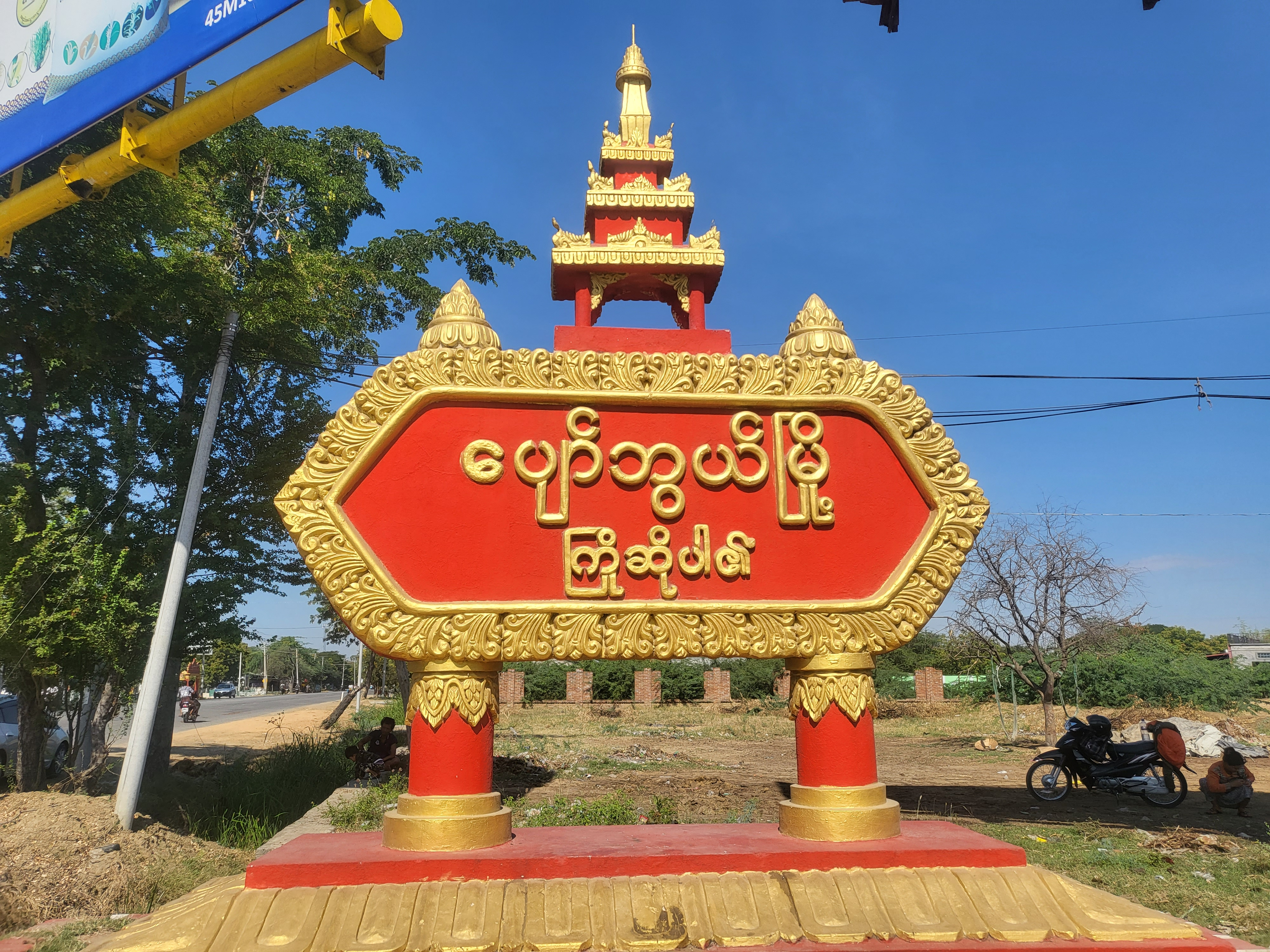
Pyawbwe Signboard
