= Mawlaik =

Mawlaik မော်လိုက်
- Town
- Location of Mawlaik, Burma
- Coordinates: 23°17′N 94°05′E
- Country: Myanmar
- Division: Sagaing Region
- District: Mawlaik
- Township: Mawlaik
- Elevation: 335 ft (102 m)

Population (2021)
  - Total: 44,540
- Time zone: UTC+6.30 (MST)

Mawlaik (Burmese: မော်လိုက် [mɔ̀ laɪʔ]; Shan: မေႃႇလဵၵ်း; /mɔ2 lek4/) is a town in Mawlaik District, Sagaing Region in north-west Myanmar. It is located along the Chindwin River, which is the largest tributary of the country's main river, the Ayeyarwady.

== Etymology ==
The name "Mawlaik" means "iron mine" in the Shan language.

== Climate ==
Climate data for Mawlaik (1991–2020)
Month	Jan	Feb	Mar	Apr	May	Jun	Jul	Aug	Sep	Oct	Nov	Dec	Year
Mean daily maximum °C (°F)	25.8 (78.4)	29.4 (84.9)	33.8 (92.8)	36.1 (97.0)	35.4 (95.7)	33.7 (92.7)	32.9 (91.2)	32.6 (90.7)	32.5 (90.5)	31.5 (88.7)	29.0 (84.2)	25.8 (78.4)	31.5 (88.7)
Daily mean °C (°F)	19.0 (66.2)	21.3 (70.3)	25.0 (77.0)	28.3 (82.9)	29.5 (85.1)	29.5 (85.1)	29.2 (84.6)	29.0 (84.2)	28.5 (83.3)	27.2 (81.0)	23.9 (75.0)	20.0 (68.0)	25.9 (78.6)
Mean daily minimum °C (°F)	12.2 (54.0)	13.1 (55.6)	16.2 (61.2)	20.5 (68.9)	23.6 (74.5)	25.3 (77.5)	25.6 (78.1)	25.3 (77.5)	24.6 (76.3)	22.9 (73.2)	18.8 (65.8)	14.2 (57.6)	20.2 (68.4)
Average precipitation mm (inches)	5.5 (0.22)	5.8 (0.23)	12.7 (0.50)	39.2 (1.54)	162.1 (6.38)	251.8 (9.91)	284.5 (11.20)	293.9 (11.57)	319.2 (12.57)	181.7 (7.15)	25.0 (0.98)	5.9 (0.23)	1,587.2 (62.49)
Average precipitation days (≥ 1.0 mm)	1.0	1.0	2.2	5.7	11.0	15.9	17.6	17.4	14.3	9.7	2.6	0.9	99.2
Source: World Meteorological Organization
