= Ye-U District =

District in Sagaing Region of Myanmar

- District
- Location within Sagaing Region

- Location within Myanmar
- Coordinates: 22°45′N 95°25′E
- Country: Myanmar
- Division: Sagaing Region
- Capital: Ye-U
- Time zone: UTC+6:30 (MMT)

Ye-U District (Burmese: ရေဦးခရိုင်) is a district in Sagaing Region of Myanmar. The district is located in the north-western part of the country. Its administrative center is the city of Ye-U.

== Townships ==
The district consists of the following townships:

- Ye-U Township
  - Ye-U
- Taze Township
  - Taze
- Tabayin Township
  - Tabayin
  - Saing Pyin

Townships of Ye-U district Taze Ye-U Tabayin
