= Kanbalu District =

District in Sagaing Region, Myanmar

Coordinates: 23°12′12″N 95°31′01″E

- District
- Kanbalu district in Sagaing region
- Country: Myanmar
- Region: Sagaing Region
- No. of Townships: 2
- Capital: Kanbalu
- Time zone: UTC+6.30 (MST)

Kanbalu District is a district in Sagaing Division located in north-western Burma (Myanmar). Its administrative center is the city of Kanbalu.

== Townships ==
Townships of Kanbalu district Kanbalu Kyunhla

The district consists of the following townships, all formerly from Shwebo District:

- Kanbalu Township
- Kyunhla Township
