= Pyawbwe Township =

- Township
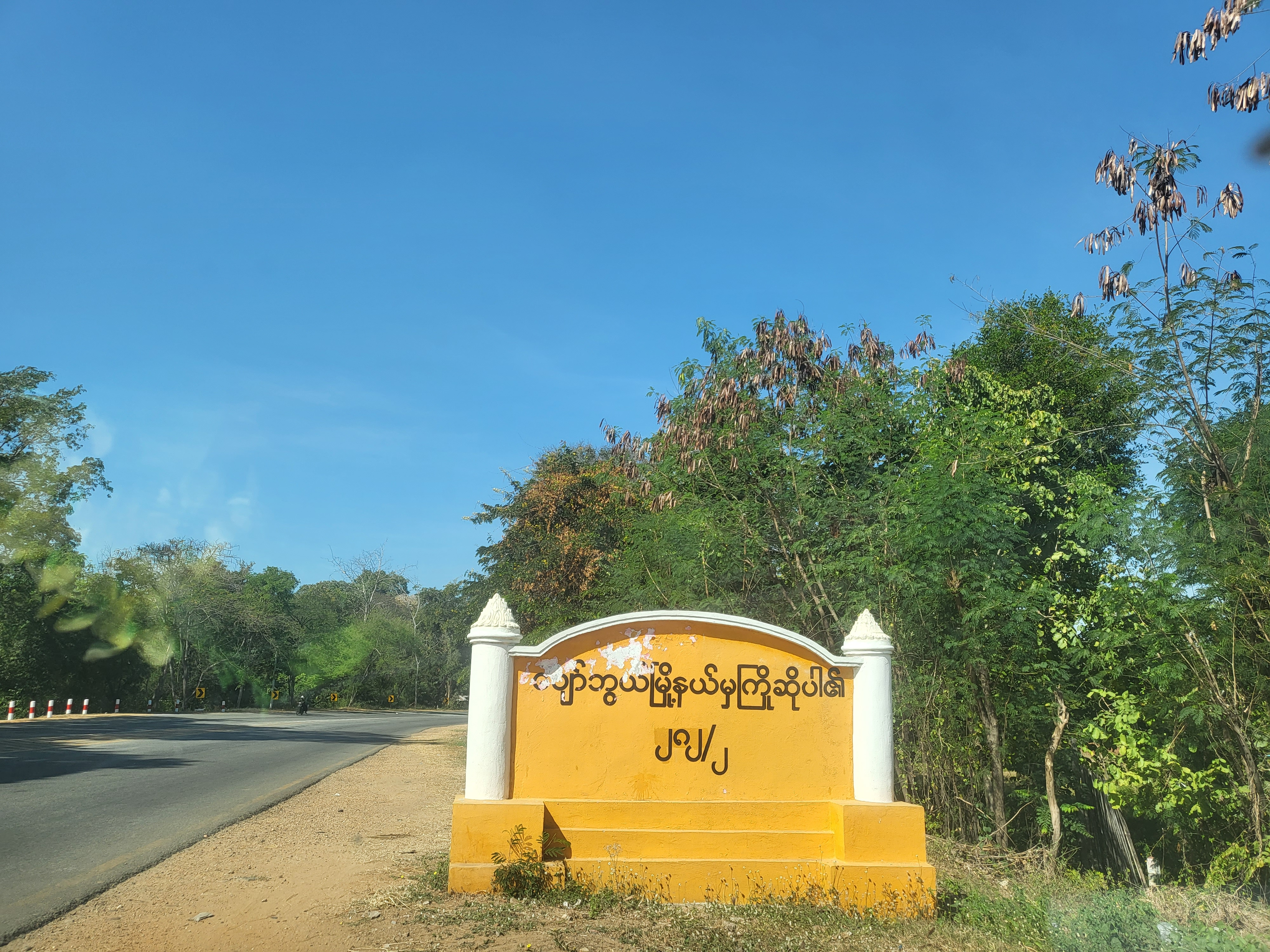
- Pyawbwe Township welcome sign

- Location in Yamethin district (red colour)

- Location within Myanmar
- Coordinates: 20°35′N 96°4′E
- Country: Myanmar
- Division: Mandalay Region
- District: Yamethin District
- Capital: Pyawbwe

Area
  - Total: 565 sq mi (1,464 km^{2})

Population (2024)
  - Total: 263,626
  - Density: 466.4/sq mi (180.1/km^{2})
- Time zone: UTC+6:30 (MMT)

Pyawbwe is a township of Yamethin District in the Mandalay Division of Myanmar.

A French–Myanmar joint team excavated 46 items from the Bronze and Iron Age near Gyogon village in 2011. They recovered 35 human remains including 6 nearly complete skeletons. Seven humans remains were buried in pots and 3 in wooden coffins. One corpse was wearing a bronze ring and a necklace decorated with eyeteeth. Research work has been conducted over 19 sites since 1998. It was the first time human remains found in the area had been buried in wooden coffins and decorated with a necklace.

== See also ==
- Yindaw, a former township that was merged into this one
