= Wetlet Township =

- Township
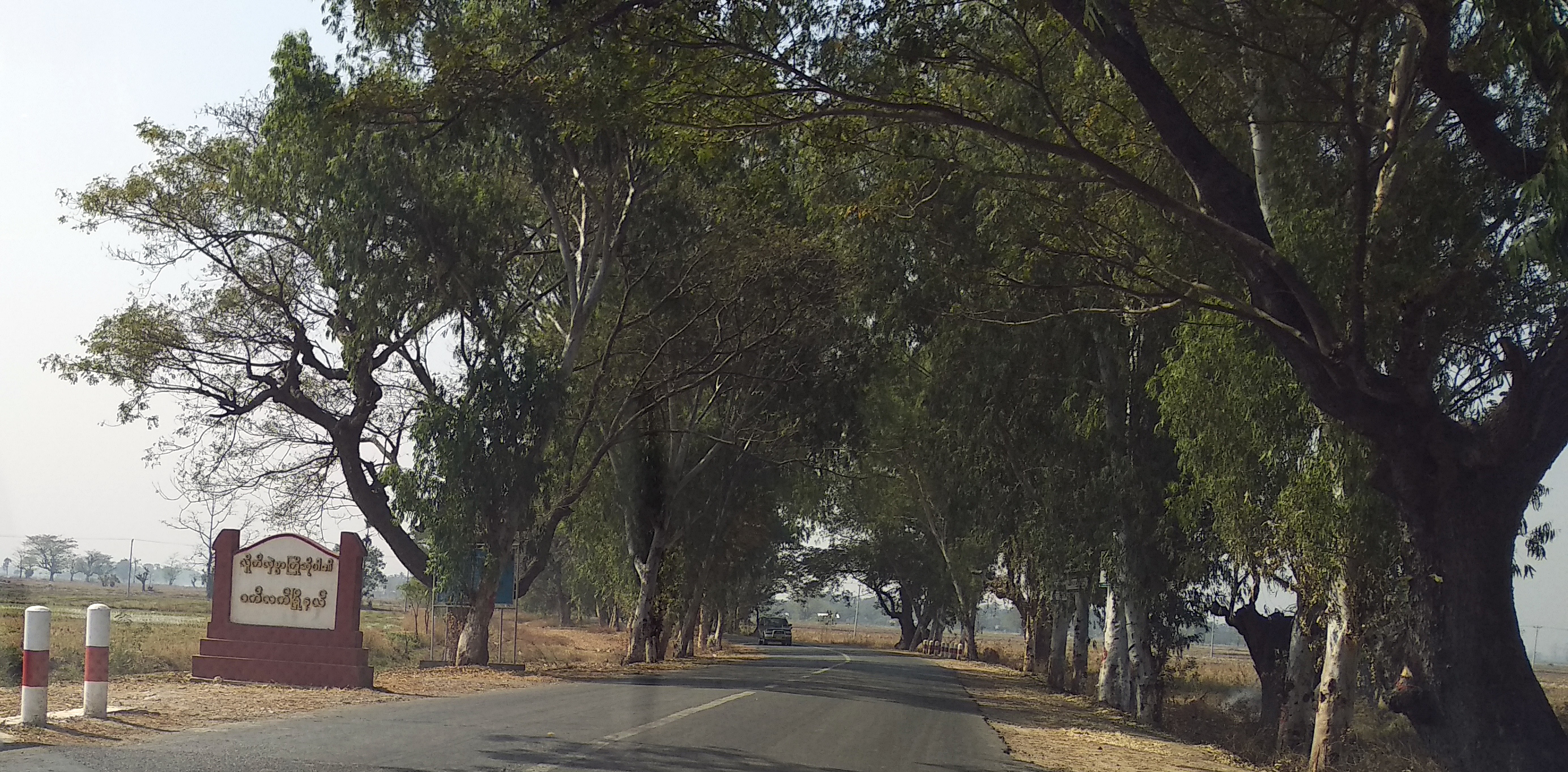
- Wetlet Township signboard located on Sagaing-Shwebo road

- location in Shwebo district
- Coordinates: 22°22′N 95°47′E
- Country: Myanmar
- Region: Sagaing Region
- District: Shwebo
- Capital: Wetlet
- Time zone: UTC+6.30 (MMT)

Wetlet Township is a township of Shwebo District in the Sagaing Division of Burma (Myanmar). It is located on the plains between the Mu River and the Irrawaddy. Its administrative seat is the town of Wetlet.

Location in Sagaing Region

Hanlin City, one of the ancient cities of Pyu Period, is located near Hanlin Village. The City was ruined because of fire. It was founded in the 1st century AD and it was the largest and most important city until around the 7th or 8th century when it was superseded by Sri Kestra. It was one of Myanmar's first sites inscribed in World Heritage Sites in June 2014. Beikthano and Sri Ksetra were other 2 sites inscribed together at the same time.

== Bounds ==
Wetlet Township is bounded on the east by the Irrawaddy River, across from which are Singu Township and Madaya Township of Mandalay District in Mandalay Division. To the north of Wetlet Township is Shwebo Township, to the south is Sagaing Township, and to the west is Ayadaw Township.

== Towns and villages ==
Among the more than seventy towns, villages and wards (village census tracts) in Wetlet township are Aungchantha, Chaungmido, Halin Taungbo, Hladaw, Mugyi, Myindaw, Sabedaw. Sadaung I, Sadaung II, and Ywatha.
