= Khin-U =

Kin-U ခင်ဦး Khin-U
- Town
- Location in Burma
- Coordinates: 22°46′08″N 95°37′18″E
- Country: Burma
- Division: Sagaing Region
- District: Shwebo
- Township: Khin-U Township

Population
  - Ethnicities: Burmans
  - Religions: Theravada Buddhism
- Time zone: UTC6:30 (MST)

Kin-U is a town in the Sagaing Division in Myanmar. It is the administrative seat of Khin-U Township.
