= Ye-U =

Coordinates: 22°45′50″N 95°25′33″E

- Town
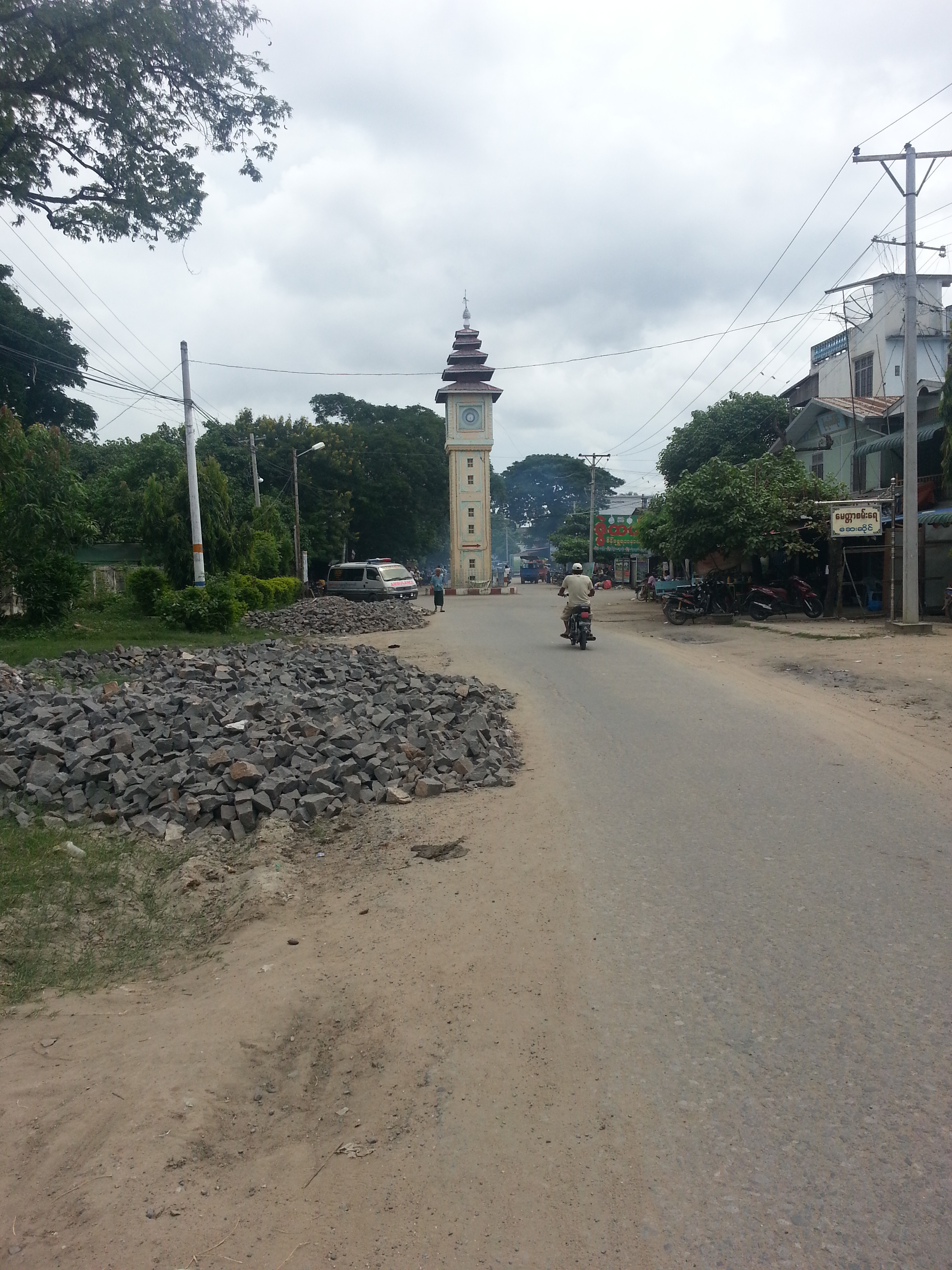
- Clock Tower in Downtown Ye-U
- Interactive map of Ye-U
- Country: Myanmar
- Region: Sagaing Region
- District: Ye-U District
- Township: Ye-U Township

Area
  - Total: 1,444.8 km^{2} (557.85 sq mi)
  - Land: 144,484 ha (357,027 acres)
- Elevation: 110 m (350 ft)
- Time zone: MST
  - Summer (DST): GMT +6:30
- Area code: 075

Ye-U is the capital of Ye-U District in southern Sagaing Region, northwestern Myanmar.
