= Khin-U Township =

- Township
- location in Shwebo district

- location in Sagaing region
- Coordinates: 22°46′N 95°37′E
- Country: Myanmar
- Region: Sagaing Region
- District: Shwebo District
- Capital: Khin-U

Population (2014)
  - Total: 146,457
  - Density: 141.1/km^{2} (365/sq mi)
- Time zone: UTC+6.30 (MST)

Khin-U Township is a township in Shwebo District in the Sagaing Division of Burma. The principal town is Khin-U.
