= Yamethin District =

District of the Mandalay Division in central Myanmar

Coordinates: 20°15′N 96°15′E

Yamethin District (Burmese: ရမည်းသင်း) is a district of the Mandalay Region in central Myanmar.

Location in Mandalay region

== Townships ==
The district contains the following townships:

- Pyawbwe Township
- Yamethin Township
