= Mu River (Irrawaddy) =

River in Myanmar

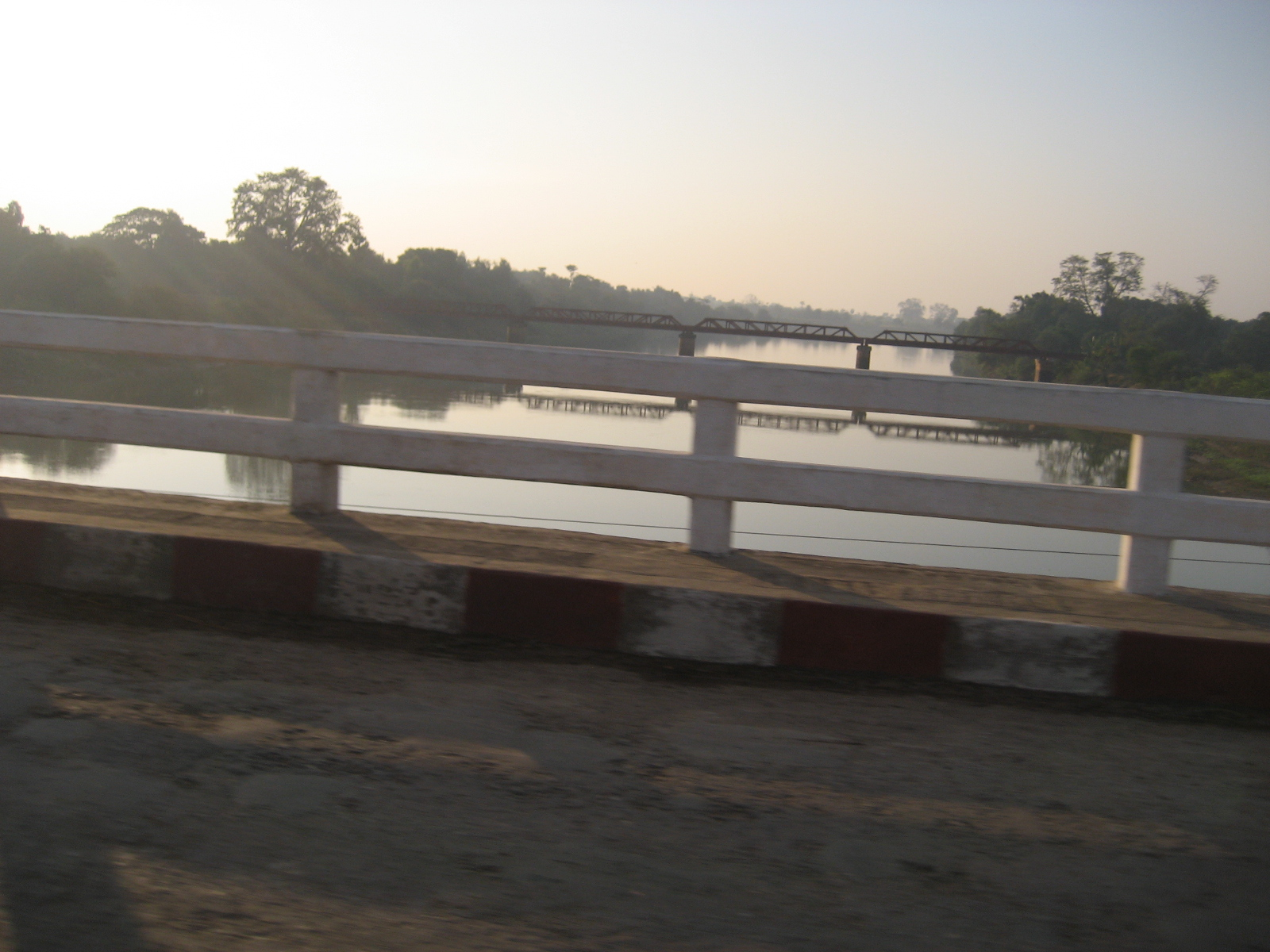
- Mu River
- Nickname: Mu Chaung
- Native name: Mu Myit (Burmese)

Location
- Country: Burma

Physical characteristics
- Source: Kabaw Valley
- Mouth: Ayeyarwady River
  - location: Myinmu, Myanmar
  - coordinates: 21°56′N 95°38′E
- Length: 275 km (171 mi)
- Basin size: 12,355 km^{2} (4,770 sq mi)to 19,739.7 km^{2} (7,621.5 mi^{2})
- Discharge
  - location: Near mouth
  - average: 375.5 m^{3}/s (13,260 cu ft/s)

Mu River (Burmese: မူးမြစ်, MLCTS: mu: mrac; IPA: [mú mjɪʔ]) is a river in upper central Myanmar (Burma), and a tributary of the country's chief river, the Irrawaddy. It drains the Kabaw valley and part of the Dry Zone between the Ayeyarwady to the east and its largest tributary the Chindwin River to the west. It flows directly north to south for about 275 km (171 mi) and enters the Ayeyarwady west of Sagaing near Myinmu.

Its catchment area above the Kabo weir is 12,355 square kilometres (4,770 sq mi). River flow and rainfall are both seasonal and erratic, at its lowest from January to April, rising sharply during May and June, and high from August to October. Because the Mu lies within the Dry Zone in the rain shadow of the Arakan Mountains, it receives scanty summer monsoon rainfall with a total streamflow of 350 millimetres (14 in). An old popular expression in Burmese goes thus: Ma myinbu, Mu myit htin (မမြင်ဖူး မူးမြစ်ထင်) - If you haven't seen a river before, you'd think the Mu is it. It may also be called Mu Chaung (creek) rather than Mu Myit (river) by some.

The wooded upper Mu valley is populated by the Kadu and Ganan minorities, whereas the fertile lower valley constitutes part of the heartlands of the ethnic majority Bamar.

== History ==
In 1503, the Mongyang State attacked and took the northern garrison town of Myedu that guarded the irrigated Mu Valley, an important granary to the Bamar Kingdom of Ava. These attacks culminated in a full-scale invasion in 1524 and the establishment of Shan rule (1527–1555). The Kabaw Valley saw many an invasion by Manipur State to the west, most notably during the reign of Gharib Nawaz (1709–1748), when his army crossed over the Chindwin and the Mu, took Myedu, and reached as far as Sagaing opposite the capital Ava. The tables were turned in 1758 after King Alaungpaya ascended the Burmese throne and invaded Manipur.

Descendants from Portuguese captives, the Bayingyi, were taken by King Anaukpetlun after defeating the adventurer Filipe de Brito e Nicote and settled in the area in the 17th century, still keep their Roman Catholic faith. To this day, their ancestry is discernible from their features.

The railroad bridge over the Mu was destroyed by the retreating Imperial Japanese forces during World War II. During April and July 1943, USAF B-25s attacked the bridge between Ywataung and Monywa with little success, but accidentally hit upon a method of successful bombing on New Year's Day 1944. The 490th squadron became so proficient that they won the accolade "Burma Bridge Busters".

An eyewitness report states that, at the time of the Depayin massacre in May 2003, most of the victims killed were burnt and the remains dumped in the Mu river.

== Flora and fauna ==
Large-leaved deciduous hardwood of the Dipterocarpus spp., mainly D. tuberculatus, dominates in the forests mixed with some ingyin (Pentacme suavis and Shorea oblongifolia), taukkyan (Terminalia elliptica), thitsi (Gluta usitata), bamboo, and kaing tall grass (Saccharum spp.) around water holes.

Chatthin Wildlife Sanctuary, with the Mu next to its eastern boundary, was designated a wildlife sanctuary in 1941 for the conservation of Eld's deer (Cervus eldi thamin). There has been a decline in the population of large mammals since the end of World War II into the 1980s, and these include tiger, bear, leopard, gaur, banteng, dhole, muntjac and hog deer.

The white-winged duck (Cairina scutulata), an endangered species of forest duck, is native to the Mu.

== Development ==
The Mu valley is fertile and the government's efforts to develop the region can be seen in the Mu River Valley Project. Mu River Bridge was finished in April 2000, a rail-and-road bridge that links Monywa, Budalin, Dabayin, Ye-U and Kin-U. From Kin-U it links with the Mandalay - Myitkyina railway line, and from Monywa with the Sagaing-Monywa line.

Kabo Weir was constructed on the Mu between 1901-1907 by the British colonial administration. The largest dam and reservoir in the region at Thaphanseik for irrigation and hydroelectric power (30 MW) was also completed in May 2002 with Chinese aid. The $20 million project was financed by the China Import and Export Bank.
