= Shwebo District =

- District
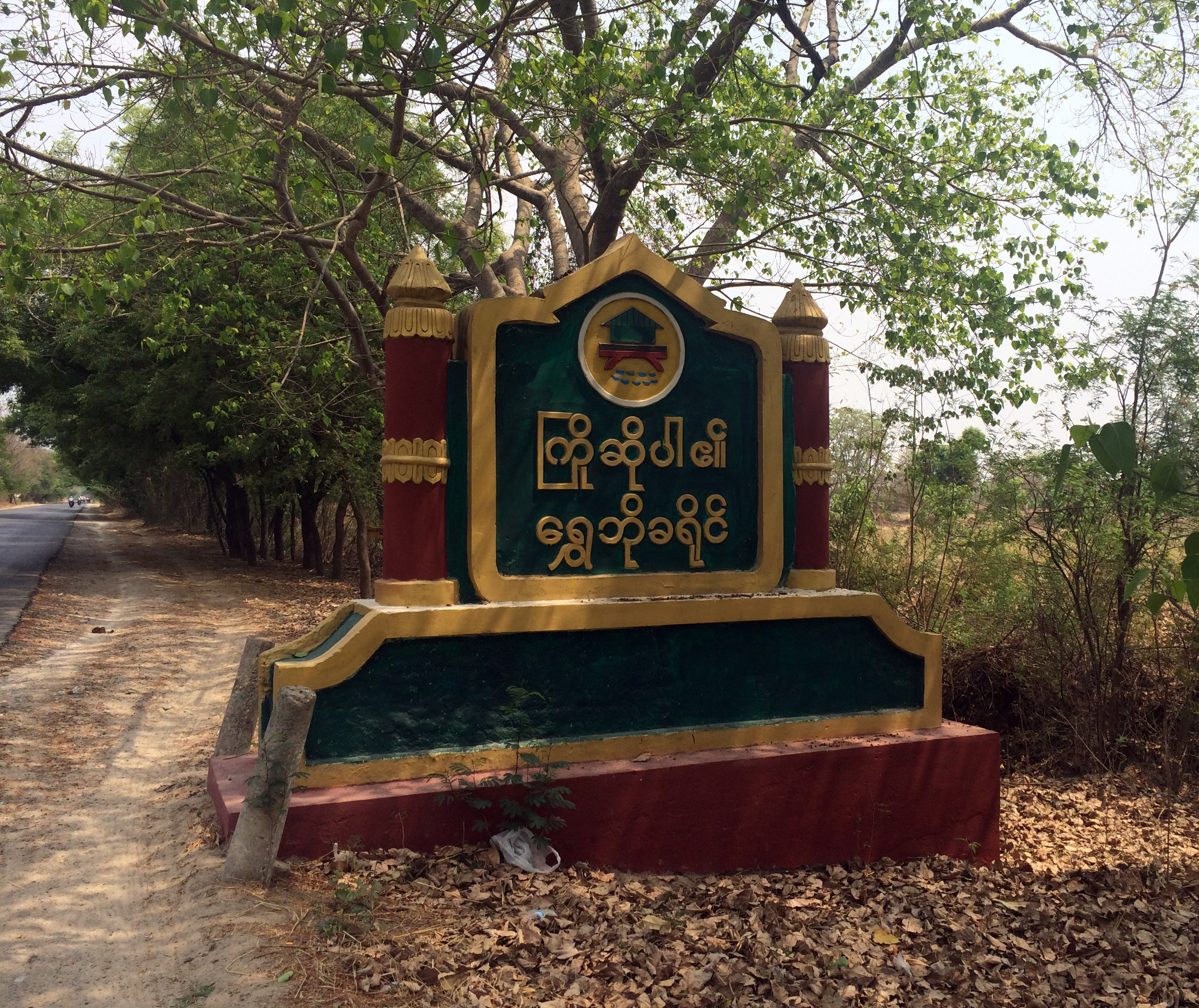
- Shwebo District signboard located on Sagaing-Shwebo road

- Shwebo District in Sagaing Region
- Coordinates: 23°12′N 95°31′E
- Country: Myanmar
- Region: Sagaing Region
- No. of Townships: 3
- Capital: Shwebo
- Time zone: UTC+6.30 (MMT)

Shwebo District is a district in south-central Sagaing Region of Myanmar. Its administrative center is the city of Shwebo.

== Townships ==
Townships of Shwebo district Shwebo Wetlet Khin-U

The district consists of the following townships:

- Khin-U Township
- Shwebo Township
  - Kyaukmyaung Subtownship
- Wetlet Township

Prior to 2022, the district also included three additional townships- Taze and Ye-U and Tabayin townships. These three townships in the west of the former district was split off to form the new Ye-U District.

Shwebo District also consisted of the following townships, which formed to become Kanbalu District sometime before 2017:

- Kanbalu Township
- Kyunhla Township

== Economy ==
The area is supported by rice farming, fisheries and timbering.
