= Sagaing Region =

Region of Myanmar

Sagaing Region စစ်ကိုင်းတိုင်းဒေသကြီး
- Region

Myanma transcription(s)
  - Burmese: cac kuing: tuing: desa. kri:
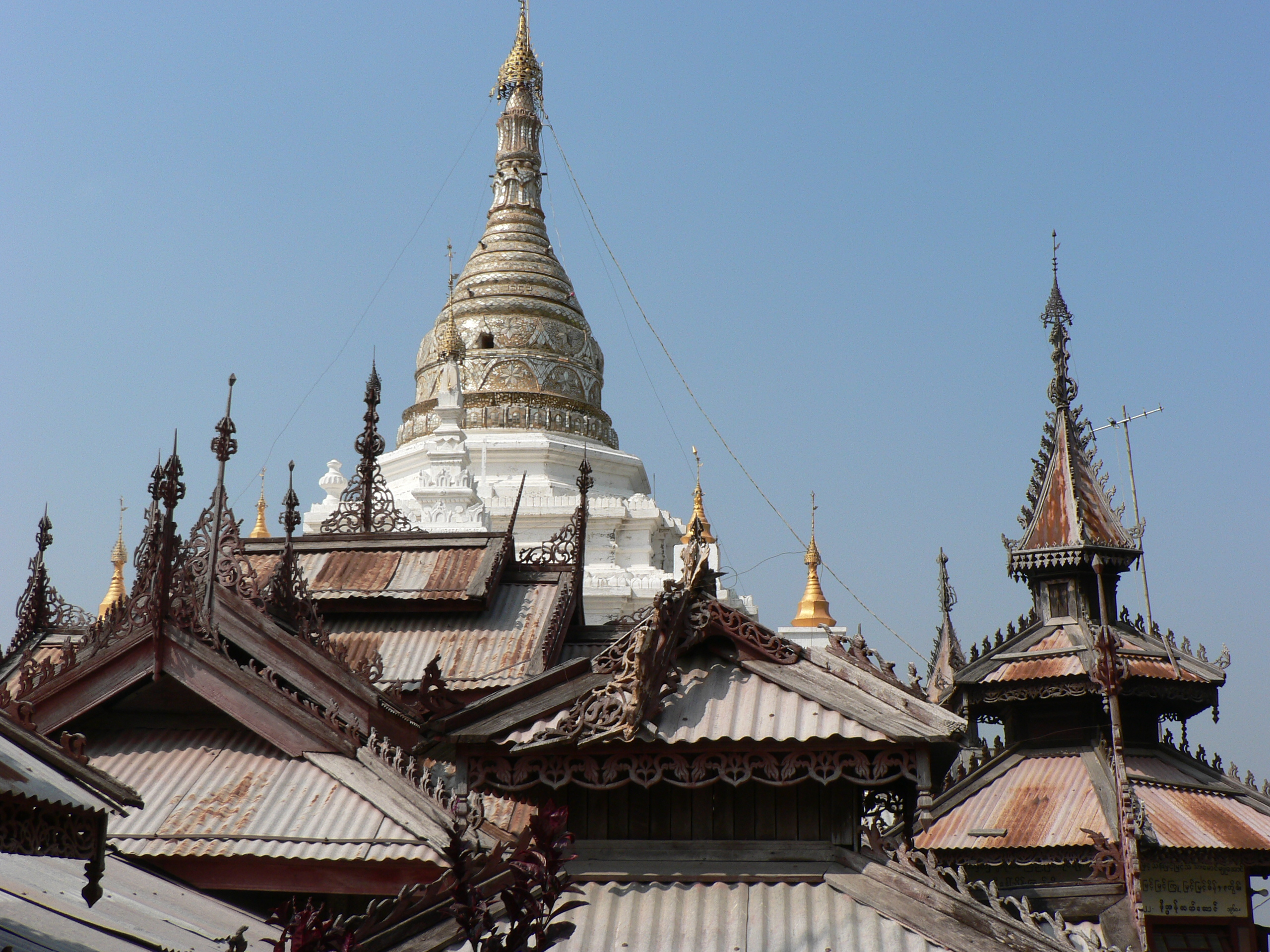
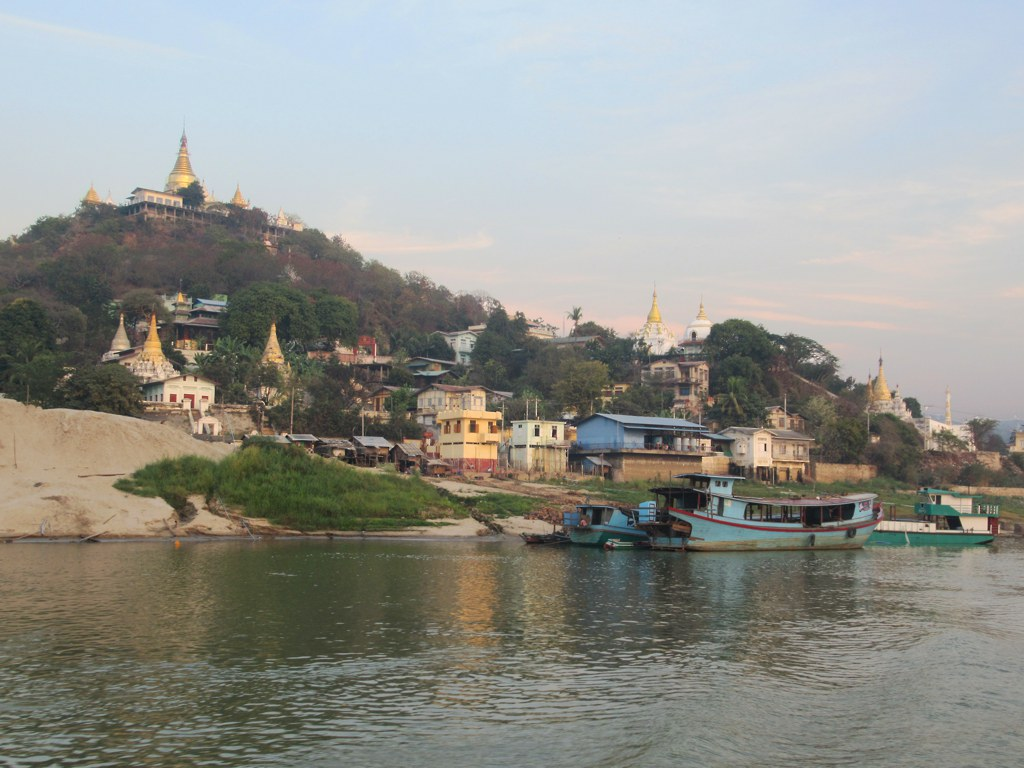
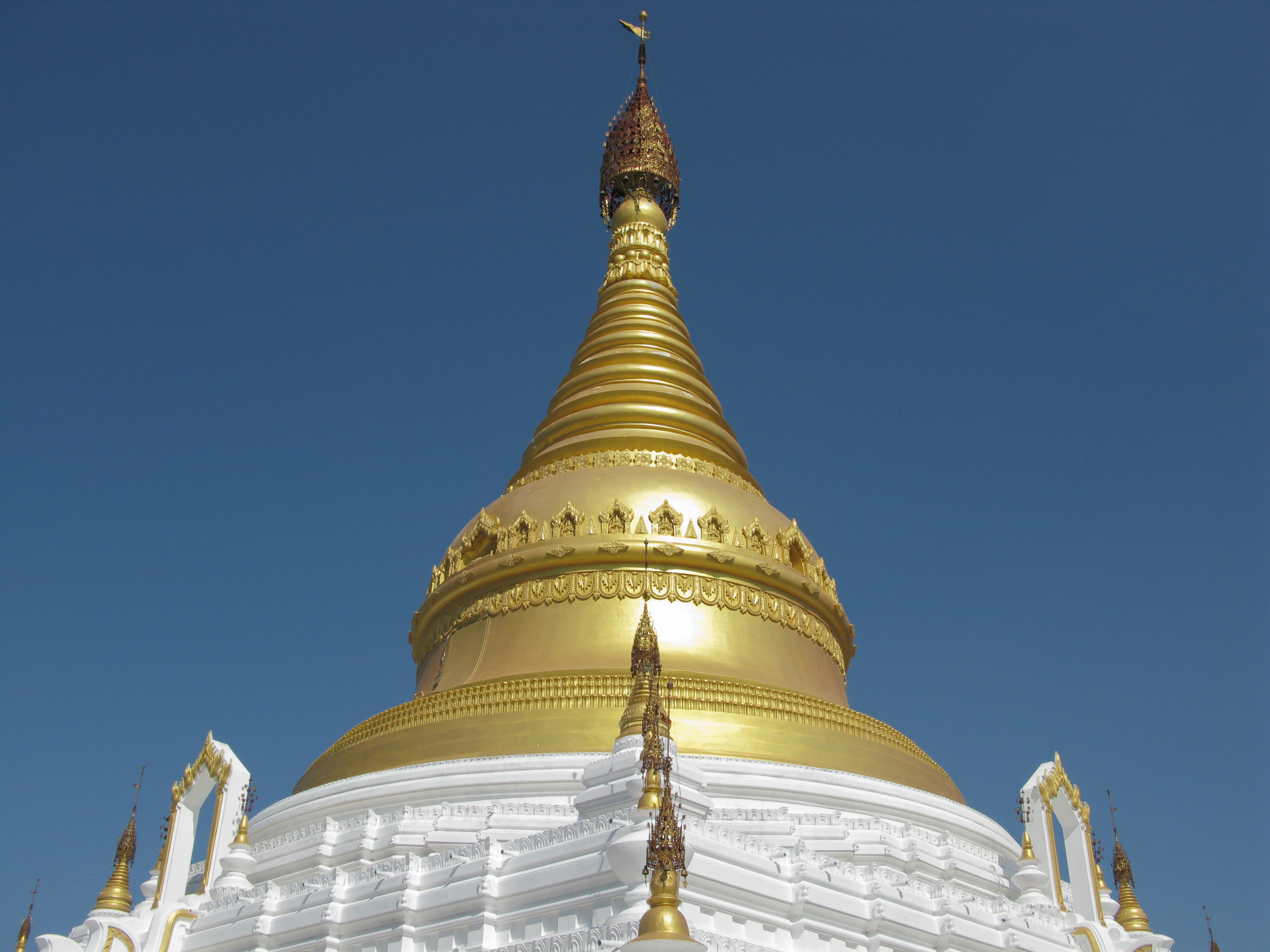
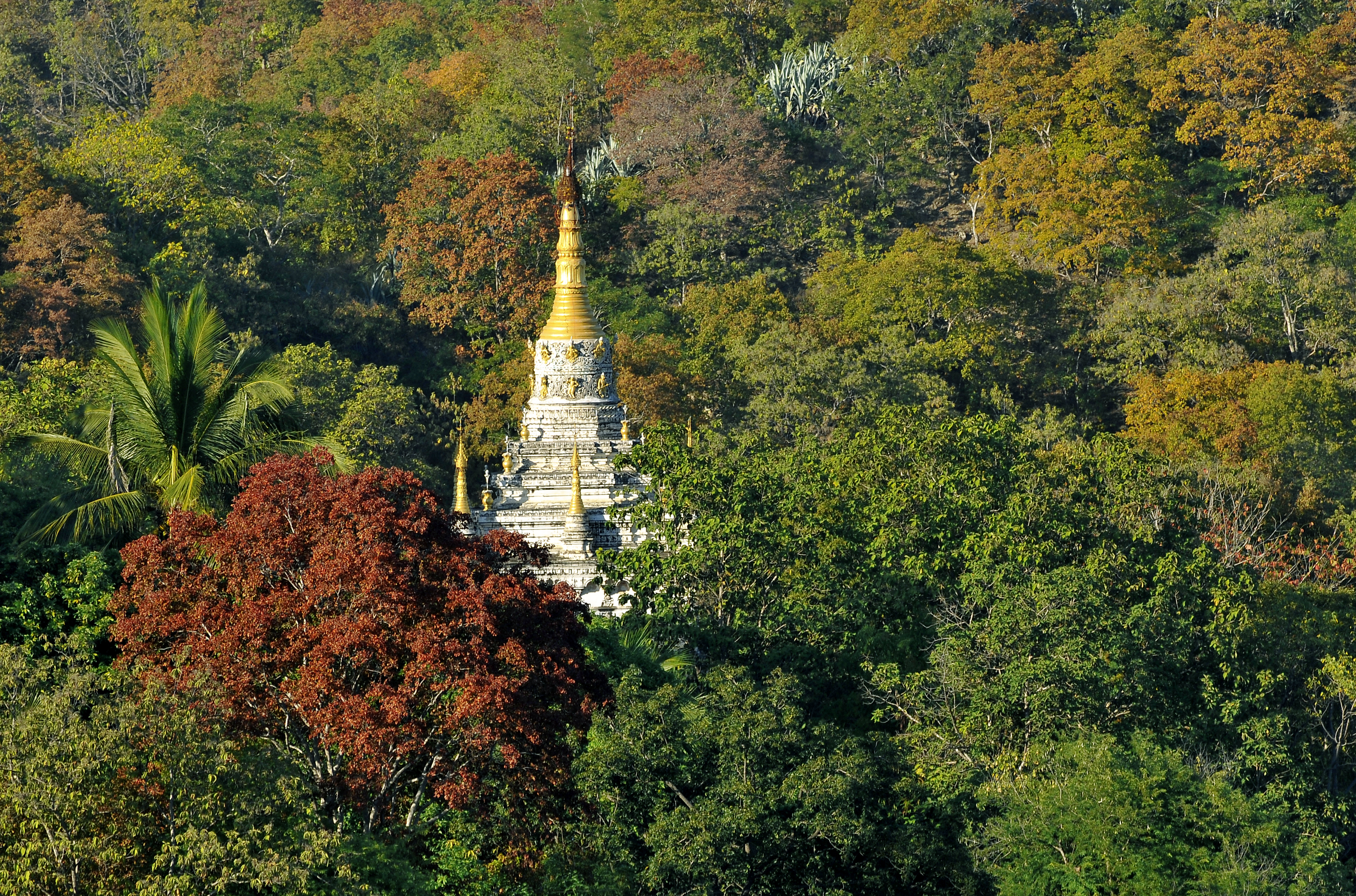
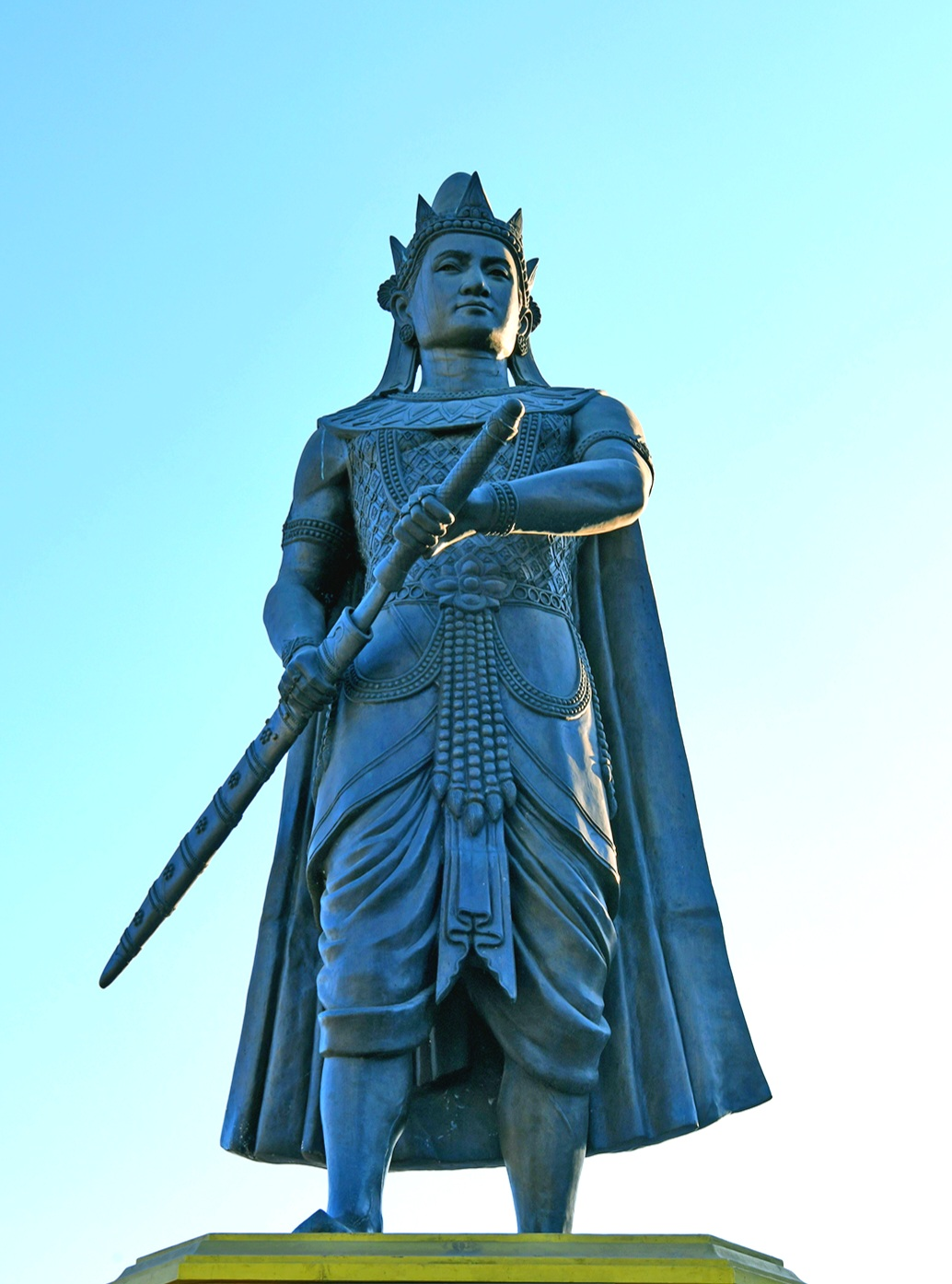
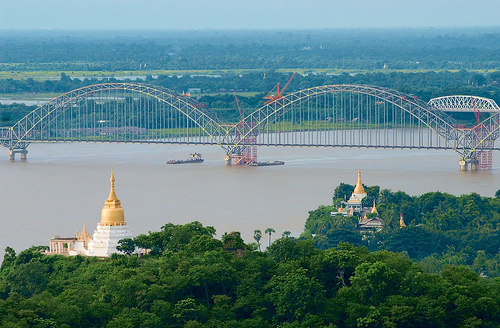

- Flag Seal

- Location of Sagaing Region in Myanmar
- Coordinates: 21°30′N 95°37′E
- Country: Myanmar
- Region: Upper
- Capital: Monywa

Government
  - Chief Minister: Myat Kyaw
  - Cabinet: Sagaing Region Government
  - Legislature: Sagaing Region Hluttaw
  - Judiciary: The Sagaing Region High Court

Area
  - Total: 93,704.5 km^{2} (36,179.5 sq mi)
  - Rank: 2nd
- Highest elevation (Mount Saramati): 3,841 m (12,602 ft)

Population (2014)
  - Total: 5,325,347
  - Rank: 5th
  - Density: 56.8313/km^{2} (147.192/sq mi)

Demographics
  - Ethnicities: Bamar; Shan; Mizo; Kuki; Naga; Khamti
  - Religions: Buddhism 92.2% Christianity 6.5% Islam 1.1% Hinduism 0.1% Animism 0.1%
- Time zone: UTC+06:30 (MST)
- ISO 3166 code: MM-01
- HDI (2017): 0.547 low · 9th
- Website: sagaingregion.gov.mm

Sagaing Region (Burmese: စစ်ကိုင်းတိုင်းဒေသကြီး, pronounced [zəɡáɪ̯ɰ̃ táɪ̯ɰ̃ dèθa̰ dʑí]; formerly Sagaing Division) is a first-level administrative division of Myanmar, located in the north-western part of the country between latitude 21° 30' north and longitude 94° 97' east. It is bordered by Chin State and India's Nagaland, Manipur, and Arunachal Pradesh states to the west and north, Kachin State, Shan State, and Mandalay Region to the east and Mandalay Region and Magway Region to the south. The Ayeyarwady River forms a greater part of its eastern and also southern boundary. Sagaing Region has an area of 93,527 square kilometres (36,111 sq mi), making it the second-largest subdivision of Myanmar. In 1996, it had a population of over 5,300,000, while its population in 2012 was 6,600,000. The urban population in 2012 was 1,230,000, and the rural population was 5,360,000. The namesake of Sagaing Region is Sagaing but the administrative capital and largest city is Monywa.

== History ==
=== 1st to 13th centuries ===
Pyu city in red

The Pyu were the first in recorded history to populate the area of Sagaing Region by the first century CE. The Burmans first migrated into Upper Myanmar by the ninth century CE. The area came under the Pagan Kingdom certainly by the middle of the 11th century when the King Anawrahta (r. 1044–1077) founded the Pagan Empire, which encompassed modern-day Myanmar.

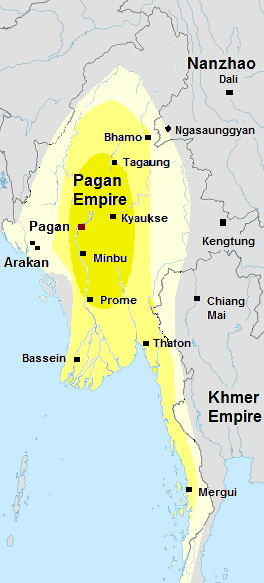
Pagan Empire

Sagaing state came under territory of Mong Mao in the heyday of the Si Kefa period (1360)

=== 13th to 19th centuries ===
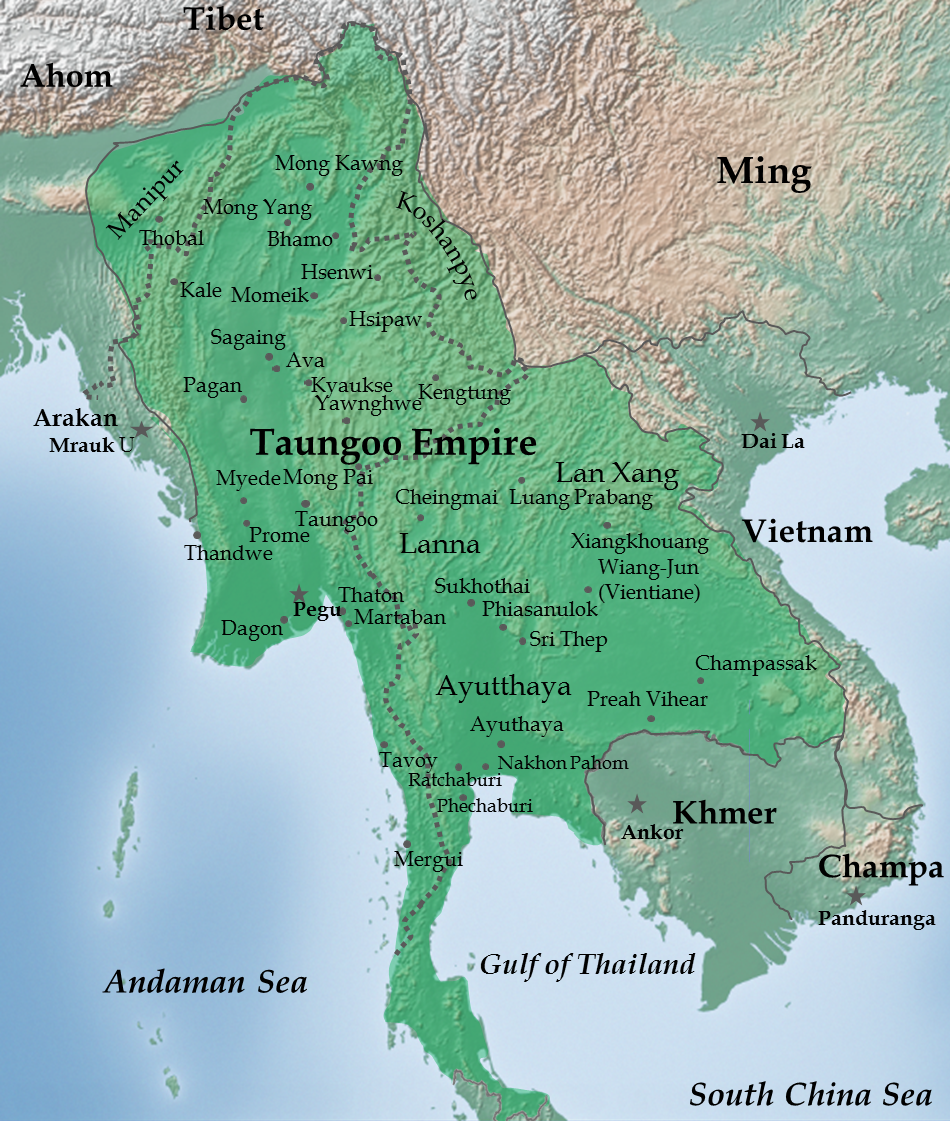
Map of Taungoo Empire in 1580 stretched from Manipur in the west to Cambodia in the east

After the fall of Pagan in 1287, the northwestern parts of Upper Myanmar came under the Sagaing Kingdom (1315–1364) ruled by Burmanized Shan kings. The area was ruled by the kings of Ava from 1364 to 1555 and the kings of Taungoo from 1555 to 1752. Konbaung Dynasty (1752–1885), founded by king Alaungpaya in Shwebo, became the last Burmese dynasty before the British conquest of Upper Burma in 1885. The area became Sagaing Division after the Burmese independence in January 1948.

=== Modern era ===
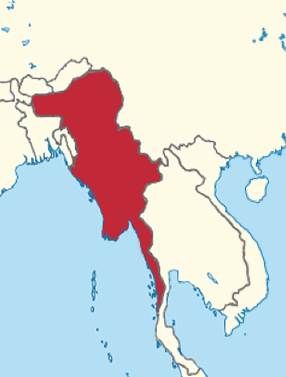
Konbaung Empire in 1824

In the aftermath of the 2021 Myanmar coup d'état, Sagaing Region, which is part of the Bamar homeland, emerged as a stronghold of resistance against military rule. Myanmar Armed Forces has engaged in significant military offensives throughout the region to quell resistance and intimidate local villagers. Sagaing Region has since become the site of several high-profile massacres by military forces, including the 2022 Let Yet Kone massacre and the 2023 Tar Taing massacre.

In March 2025, a M_{w} 7.7–7.9 earthquake struck close to the capital city of Sagaing. Significant damage was recorded within the city and throughout the entire region.

== Administrative divisions ==
As of 2022, Sagaing Region consists of 13 districts and 1 Self-Administered Zone, divided into 34 townships with 198 wards and villages. The major cities are Sagaing, Shwebo, Monywa, Ye U, Katha, Kale, Tamu, Mawlaik and Hkamti. Mingun with its famous bell is located near Sagaing but can be reached across the Ayeyarwady from Mandalay.

Hkamti District	Hkamti Township
Homalin District	Homalin Township
Kale District	Kale Township • Kalewa Township • Mingin Township
Kanbalu District	Kanbalu Township • Kyunhla Township
Katha District	Banmauk Township • Htigyaing Township • Indaw Township • Katha Township
Kawlin District	Kawlin Township • Pinlebu Township • Wuntho Township
Mawlaik District	Mawlaik Township • Paungbyin Township
Monywa District	Ayadaw Township • Budalin Township • Chaung-U Township • Monywa Township
Naga Self-Administered Zone	Lahe Township • Leshi Township • Nanyun Township
Sagaing District	Myaung Township • Myinmu Township • Sagaing Township
Shwebo District	Khin-U Township • Shwebo Township • Wetlet Township
Tamu District	Tamu Township
Ye-U District	Tabayin Township • Taze Township • Ye-U Township
Yinmabin District	Kani Township • Pale Township • Salingyi Township • Yinmabin Township

In August 2010, three former townships of Hkamti District were transferred, in accordance with the 2008 constitution, to a new administrative unit, the Naga Self-Administered Zone.

== Government ==
=== Executive ===
Sagaing Region was formerly under the control of a military junta known as the State Administration Council (SAC), led by General Min Aung Hlaing. This regime seized power following a coup on February 1, 2021, overthrowing the elected civilian government led by Aung San Suu Kyi and the National League for Democracy (NLD). Since then, the country has been under an extended state of emergency and faces an ongoing civil war between the junta, pro-democracy forces, and various ethnic armed groups. However, from late 2025 to early 2026, sham elections were held for the country's national legislature, the Union Assembly and for administrative divisional legislatures, including the Sagaing Region Hluttaw. This has led to Sagaing Region's governmental institutions functioning again, including the Sagaing Region Government. The Sagaing Region Government is the government of Sagaing Region and exercises authority over the region.

=== Legislature ===
The Sagaing Region Hluttaw is the legislature of Sagaing Region, responsible for local governance, passing regional laws, approving localized budgets, and overseeing the region cabinet. The Hluttaw is unicameral, with 101 seats.

=== Judiciary ===
The Sagaing Region High Court is the highest court within Sagaing Region.

== Demographics ==
Historical population
Year	Pop.	±%
1973	3,119,054	—
1983	3,862,172	+23.8%
2014	5,325,347	+37.9%
Source: 2014 Myanmar Census

In 2014, Sagaing Region had a population of 5.3 million people.

=== Ethnic makeup ===
Ethnic composition of Sagaing Region
Ethnic group	Percentage
Bamar	87.5%
Shan	4.8%
Chin	4.0%
Naga	2.6%
Other	1.1%
Source: 2019 GAD township reports

The Bamar make up the majority of the region's population, living in Anyar, the country's central dry zone and along the Mandalay-Myitkyina Railroad. Other groups, like the Shan and Kachin, form small minorities. The Shan live in the upper Chindwin River valley. Kuki people, which includes the Thadou people, live in the south and along the Indo-Myanmar Border from Homalin to Tamu-Namphalong axis.

Smaller ethnic groups native to the Region include the Kadu and Ganang, who live in the upper Mu River valley and Meza River valley. There are also an unknown number of Catholic Bayingyi people (at least 3,000), the descendants of 16th and 17th century Portuguese adventurers and mercenaries, who live in their ancestral villages on the expansive plains of the Mu river valley.

After the 2014 Census in Myanmar, the Burmese government indefinitely withheld release of detailed ethnicity data, citing concerns around political and social concerns surrounding the issue of ethnicity in Myanmar. In 2022, researchers published an analysis of the General Administration Department's nationwide 2018-2019 township reports to tabulate the ethnic makeup of the region.

=== Religion ===
Religion in Sagaing (2015)
1. Buddhism (92.2%)
2. Christianity (6.50%)
3. Islam (1.10%)
4. Other religion (0.10%)
5. Hinduism (0.10%)

According to the 2014 Myanmar Census, Buddhists, who make up 92.2% of Sagaing Region's population, form the largest religious community there. Minority religious communities include Christians (6.6%), Muslims (1.1%), and Hindus (0.1%) who collectively comprise the remainder of Sagaing Region's population. 0.1% of the population listed no religion, other religions, or were otherwise not enumerated.

According to the State Sangha Maha Nayaka Committee's 2016 statistics, 55,041 Buddhist monks were registered in Sagaing Region, comprising 10.3% of Myanmar's total Sangha membership, which includes both novice samanera and fully-ordained bhikkhu. The majority of monks belong to the Thudhamma Nikaya (83.8%), followed by Shwegyin Nikaya (16.1%), with the remainder of monks belonging to other small monastic orders. 9,915 thilashin were registered in Sagaing Region, comprising 16.4% of Myanmar's total thilashin community.

== Ecology ==
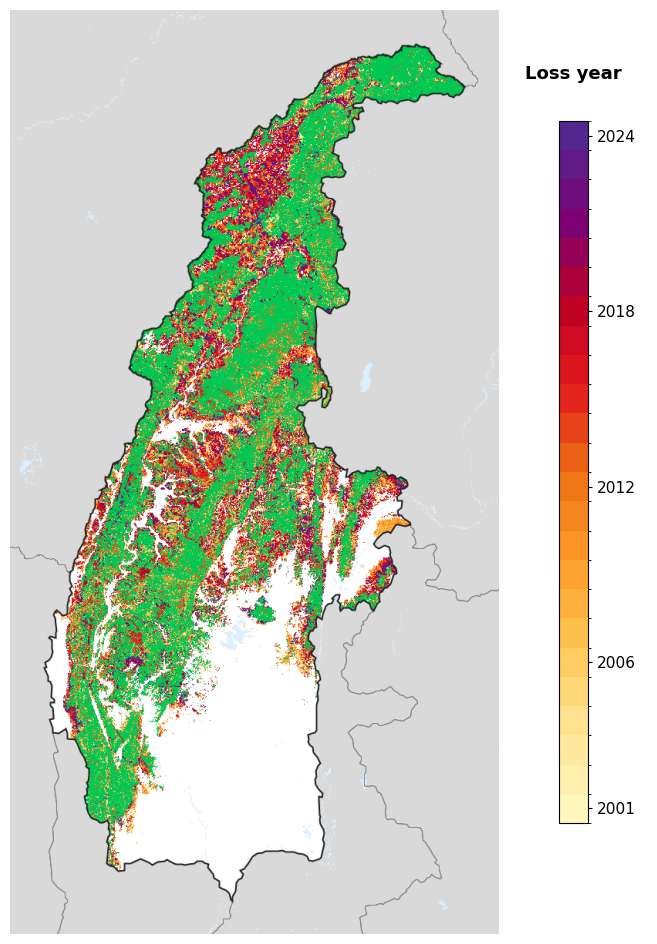
Tree-cover loss year in Sagaing Region, 2001-2024, from the Global Forest Change dataset.

There are a number of protected areas in Sagaing Region, among them are Alaungdaw Kathapa National Park, Chatthin Wildlife Sanctuary, Mahamyaing Wildlife Sanctuary, and Htamanthi Wildlife Sanctuary in Homalin Township.

== Transport ==
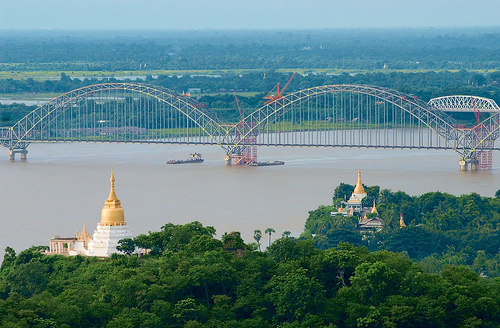
Sagaing

Hemmed in by two great rivers of Myanmar, the Irrawaddy and the Chindwin, river transport is a common way to move people and cargo. Much of the inland Sagaing Region relies on roads and rail in poor condition.

== Economy ==
Agriculture is the chief occupation. The leading crop is rice, which occupies most of the arable ground. Other crops include wheat, sesame, peanut, pulses, cotton, and tobacco. The region being next to India, depends on the export import business from India. It is the gateway to India for Myanmar. Sagaing is Myanmar's leading producer of wheat, contributing more than 80% of the country's total production. Important minerals include gold, coal, salt and small amounts of petroleum. Industry includes textiles, copper refining, gold smelting, and a diesel engine plant. The Region has many rice mills, edible oil mills, saw mills, cotton mills, and mechanized weaving factories. Local industry includes earthen pots, silverware, bronze-wares, iron-wares and lacquerware.

Forestry is important in the wetter upper regions along the Chindwin River, with teak and other hardwoods extracted. As in other parts of the country, reforestation is not effective enough to maintain sustainable forestry. Since the 2021 Myanmar coup d'état, illegal logging of teak and tamalan trees has surged in Sagaing Region, predominantly in key contested battlegrounds, including Kani, Yinmabin, Kantbalu, Indaw and Banmauk townships. Both the Burmese military and resistance groups have profited from the illegal logging trade. Smugglers transport the wood to India in order to circumvent economic sanctions, and use the Myanma Timber Enterprise to license the wood as being sourced from permitted areas.

== Education ==
Educational opportunities in Myanmar are extremely limited outside the main cities of Yangon and Mandalay. According to official statistics, less than 10% of primary school students in Sagaing Region reach high school.

As of 2002–2003	Primary	Middle	High
The number of Schools	3854 Primary schools	190 Middle schools	84 High Schools
Number of Teachers	16,100 Teachers	5000 Teachers	1600 Teachers
Number of Students	550,000 Students	140,000 Students	49,000 Students

Sagaing Region has three national "professional" universities in the Monywa University of Economics, Sagaing University of Education and the Sagaing Institute of Education. Monywa University is the main liberal arts university in the region. Sagaing Institute of Education also known Sagaing University of Education is one of two senior universities of education in Myanmar.

== Healthcare ==
The general state of healthcare in Myanmar is poor. The military government spends anywhere from 0.5% to 3% of the country's GDP on health care, consistently ranking among the lowest in the world. Although healthcare is nominally free, in reality, patients have to pay for medicine and treatment, even in public clinics and hospitals. Public hospitals lack many of the basic facilities and equipment. Moreover, the healthcare infrastructure outside of Yangon and Mandalay is extremely poor. In 2003, Sagaing Region had less than a quarter of the number of hospital beds counted in Yangon Region, with a similar size of population.

As of 2002–2003	# of Hospitals	# of Beds
Number of Specialist hospitals	0 Hospitals	0 Beds
Number of General hospitals with specialist services	2 Hospitals	400 Beds
Number of General hospitals	38 Hospitals	1168 Beds
Number of Health clinics	48 Hospitals	768 Beds
Total	88 Hospitals	2336 Beds
