= Bhamo Township =

Coordinates: 24.2667°N 97.2333°E

Bhamo Township ဗန်းမော်မြို့နယ် Bamaw Township
- Township
- Location in Bhamo district
- Country: Myanmar
- State: Kachin State
- District: Bhamo District
- Capital: Bhamo
- Time zone: UTC+6:30 (MST)

Bhamo Township (Burmese: ဗန်းမော်မြို့နယ်) is a township of Bhamo District in the Kachin State of Myanmar (Burma). The principal town is Bhamo.

== Towns and villages ==
- Asin
- Awngsa
- Bansak
- Bhamo
- Bodewa
- Budaung
- Chiri Dumhpawng
- Chyingma
- Dumhpawng
- Gahkyeng
- Hakkhan
- Hantet
- Hinsaing
- Hkadaung
- Hkanlaing
- Hkashang
- Hkawan
- Hko-nwe
- Hmanlin
- Hngetpyawdaw
- Hpaulu
- Htaira
- Htonbo
- Jeang
- Kabani
- Kadaw
- Kamani
- Kangyi
- Kantha
- Karing
- Kaungsin
- Kaungton
- Kawabum
- Kawahka
- Kawnan
- Kawngbu
- Kho-kyin
- Konkha
- Kon-mahat
- Kontein
- Konywagyi
- Kumbabum
- Kwelon
- Kyauk-aik
- Kyauktalon
- Kyauktan
- Kyungyi
- Kyunkon
- Kyun-u
- Kywegon
- Kywegyo
- Labang-gahtawng
- Lahta-gahtawng
- Lamung-gahtawng
- Lapaidan
- Lawngpu
- Letma
- Letpandan
- Longjung
- Lonsadaung
- Machyang
- Madang
- Maing Ka
- Man Bung
- Man Ho
- Man Hpa
- Man Kang
- Man Kham
- Man Law
- Man Ma-kauk
- Man Maw
- Man Naung
- Manpraw
- Man The
- Man Wein
- Man Yut
- Maran
- Mawsaing
- Mawtaung
- Myale
- Myazedi
- Nakang
- Namdaungmawn
- Nampha
- Namsai
- Namsau
- Namti
- Nanhingyi
- Nanlwin
- Nanmapwe
- Natyedwin Sakan
- Naunghu
- Naungka
- Naungkhan
- Naungkyo
- Naunglan
- Naungmo
- Naungpyit
- Nawngbya
- Nawnghkyeng
- Nawnghpawng
- Nawngsai
- Nayo
- Ngakaw
- Ngamu
- Ngashang
- Nyaungbindat
- Nyaunggon
- Pa-hok
- Pahok
- Palok
- Panma
- Papaung
- Pinchein
- Pinthet
- Po Aung
- Ponnesen
- Pulaung
- Punoi
- Pyinga
- Ritbum
- Sama Dumhpawng
- Sampenago
- Sataw-gahtawng
- Sawadi
- Senien
- Shalap
- Shwebo
- Shwegyaung
- Shwekyina
- Shwepu
- Sihet
- Si-in
- Simun
- Sindu
- Sin Kin
- Sintaw
- Sithaung
- Subotkon
- Tagala
- Tamaiklon
- Taungni
- Tawka
- Teinthaw
- Thabyebin
- Thabye-gon
- Thamainggyi
- Thanbankyun
- Thapanbin
- Thathana
- Theinlin
- Thitson
- U-ni-ya
- Wabaw Dumhpawng
- Walu
- Waraseng
- Wunnwedaung
- Ye-ni
- Yihku
- Yondaung
- Ywashe
