= Thanbankyun =

- Location in Burma
- Coordinates: 24°9′N 97°8′E
- Country: Burma
- State: Kachin State
- District: Bhamo District
- Township: Bhamo Township

Population
  - Religions: Buddhism
- Time zone: UTC+6.30 (UTC + 6:30)

Thanbankyun is a village in Bhamo Township, Bhamo District, Kachin State of north-eastern Myanmar. It is located across the Irrawaddy River from the village of Man Pu, a few miles west of a town called Mansi.
