= Myazedi =

- Location in Burma
- Coordinates: 24°20′N 97°8′E
- Country: Burma
- State: Kachin State
- District: Bhamo District
- Township: Bhamo Township

Population
  - Religions: Buddhism
- Time zone: UTC+6.30 (UTC + 6:30)

Myazedi is a village in Bhamo Township in Bhamo District in the Kachin State of north-eastern Burma.

The Bagan-era Ngasaunggyan fort, known as the site of the Battle of Ngasaunggyan in 1277, is located at Mya Zay Di. Its earthen ramparts are still preserved. It is located on the Irrawaddy River, 7 km from another contemporary fort at Kaungsin.
