= Mahat =

Mahat (Sanskrit: महत्) is a Sanskrit word meaning "large" or "great". It may refer to:

- Mahat (surname), a Nepalese surname
- Mahat, Eastern Rukum, a village in Nepal
- Mahat Gaun, a locality in Nepal
- Mahat Raghavendra, Indian actor
- Mahat-tattva, Hinduism

== See also ==
- Maha (disambiguation)
- Kon-mahat, Burma
