= Madang (disambiguation) =

Madang may refer to:

== Regions ==
=== Papua New Guinea ===
- Madang, capital of Madang Province
- Madang District
- Madang Province
- Madang Airport, airport in Madang

=== Other countries ===
- Kampong Madang, a village in Brunei
- Madang, Burma, a village in Bhamo District, Kachin State, Burma
- Madang Road Station, a station of Shanghai Metro Line 9 in Shanghai, China

== Theatres ==
- Madangguk, a theatrical art in Korea

== Other ==
- Artocarpus odoratissimus, a tropical plant sometimes known as madang
