= Tangyan =

Tangyan or Tang Yan may refer to:

- Tangyan, Myanmar, in Shan State
- Tangyan Township, Myanmar
- Tiffany Tang (Chinese: 唐嫣; pinyin: Táng Yān, born 1983), Chinese actress
- Tang Yan (CEO), founder of software company Momo

== See also ==
- Dangyang, a city in China
- Tanglang station, in China
- Tan Yang (born 1989), Chinese footballer
- Tan Yang (footballer, born 1999)
