= Kyauktalon =

Kyauktalon may refer to several places in Burma:

- Kyauktalon, Bhamo
- Kyauktalon, Indaw
- Kyauktalon, Shwegu
