= Yondaung =

Yondaung may refer to several places in Burma:

- Yondaung, Bhamo
- Yondaung, Mingin
