= Nawnghkyeng =

- Location in Burma
- Coordinates: 24°30′N 97°17′E
- Country: Burma
- State: Kachin State
- District: Bhamo District
- Township: Bhamo Township

Population
  - Religions: Buddhism
- Time zone: UTC+6.30 (UTC + 6:30)

Nawnghkyeng is a village in Bhamo Township in Bhamo District in the Kachin State of north-eastern Burma.
