= Ge Ma Naing Kha Tawng =

Ge Ma Naing Kha Tawng ဂဲမနိုင်ခတောင်း Hkadaung
- Location in Burma
- Coordinates: 23°58′59″N 96°58′18″E
- Country: Burma
- State: Kachin State
- District: Bhamo District
- Township: Bhamo Township

Population (2005)
  - Religions: Buddhism
- Time zone: UTC+6.30 (UTC + 6:30)

Ge Ma Naing Kha Tawng is a village in Bhamo Township in Bhamo District in the Kachin State of north-eastern Burma.
