= Man Ma Lin =

Man Ma Lin မံမလင်း Hmanlin
- Location in Burma
- Coordinates: 24°17′33″N 97°10′26″E
- Country: Burma
- State: Kachin State
- District: Bhamo District
- Township: Bhamo Township

Population (2005)
  - Religions: Buddhism
- Time zone: UTC+6.30 (UTC + 6:30)

Man Ma Lin is a village in Bhamo Township in Bhamo District in the Kachin State of north-eastern Burma.
