= Man Law =

Man Law may refer to:

- Man Laws, beer commercials
- Man Law, Burma, a town in Kachin State

== See also ==
- Mann Act
