= Budaung =

Budaung may refer to several places in Burma:

- Budaung, Bhamo
- Budaung, Banmauk
