= Shwebo (disambiguation) =

Shwebo may refer to the following places:

- Shwebo, Sagaing, Burma
  - Shwebo District
  - Shwebo Palace
  - Shwebo University
- Shwebo, Bhamo, Kachin State, Burma
