= Shinkan =

Shinkan may refer to:

- Shinkan (official), a former type of government official in Japan who worked at a Shinto shrine
- Hamuro Mitsutoshi (1203–1276), Japanese poet and nobleman, who took the dharma name Shinkan after becoming a monk
- Shinkan (1001–1050), Japanese Buddhist monk and son of Emperor Kazan
- Shinkan, a stop on the North Chosen Line in Japanese-occupied Korea
- "Shinkan", a 1940 short story by Yukio Mishima
- "Shinkan", an episode of the 2011 anime adaptation of Softenni

== See also ==
- Shinkansen, a network of high-speed railway lines in Japan
- Shinken, a Japanese practice sword with a sharpened blade
- Sinkan, a village in Kachin State, Myanmar
- Shunkan (c. 1143–1179), Japanese monk
- Xingan County (Wade–Giles: Hsinkan), Jiangxi Province, China
