= Kone Nu =

Kone Nu ကုန်းနု Konnu
- Location in Burma
- Coordinates: 24°18′18″N 96°39′46″E
- Country: Burma
- State: Kachin State
- District: Bhamo District
- Township: Shwegu Township

Population
  - Religions: Buddhism
- Time zone: UTC+6.30 (UTC + 6:30)

Kone Nu is a village in Shwegu Township in Bhamo District in the Kachin State of north-eastern Burma.
