= Tawka =

Village in Kachin State, Myanmar

- Location in Myanmar
- Coordinates: 24°26′N 97°13′E
- Township: Bhamo Township

Population
  - Religions: Buddhism
- Time zone: UTC+6.30 (UTC + 6:30)

Tawka is a village in Bhamo Township in Bhamo District in the Kachin State in north-eastern Myanmar.
