= That Yar Kone =

That Yar Kone သာယာကုန်း Kani, Ka Ni Myaing (ကနီမြိုင်)
- Location in Burma
- Coordinates: 24°20′03″N 96°41′18″E
- Country: Burma
- State: Kachin State
- District: Bhamo District
- Township: Shwegu Township

Population
  - Religions: Buddhism
- Time zone: UTC+6.30 (UTC + 6:30)

That Yar Kone is a village in Shwegu Township, Bhamo District in the Kachin State of north-eastern Burma.
