= Han Htet =

Han Htet ဟန်ထက် Hantet
- Location in Burma
- Coordinates: 24°05′08″N 97°12′28″E
- Country: Burma
- State: Kachin State
- District: Bhamo District
- Township: Bhamo Township

Population (2005)
  - Religions: Buddhism
- Time zone: UTC+6.30 (UTC + 6:30)

Han Htet is a village in Bhamo Township in Bhamo District in the Kachin State of north-eastern Burma.
