= Ah Mat Gyi Kone =

Ah Mat Gyi Kone အမတ်ကြီးကုန်း Nawng Gam (နောင်ဂမ်း), Amatgyigon
- Location in Burma
- Coordinates: 24°28′08″N 96°46′08″E
- Country: Burma
- State: Kachin State
- District: Bhamo District
- Township: Shwegu Township

Population
  - Religions: Buddhism
- Time zone: UTC+6.30 (UTC + 6:30)

Ah Mat Gyi Kone is a village in Shwegu Township in Bhamo District in the Kachin State of north-eastern Myanmar.
