= Tangyan Township =

Tangyan Township တန့်ယန်းမြို့နယ်
- Township
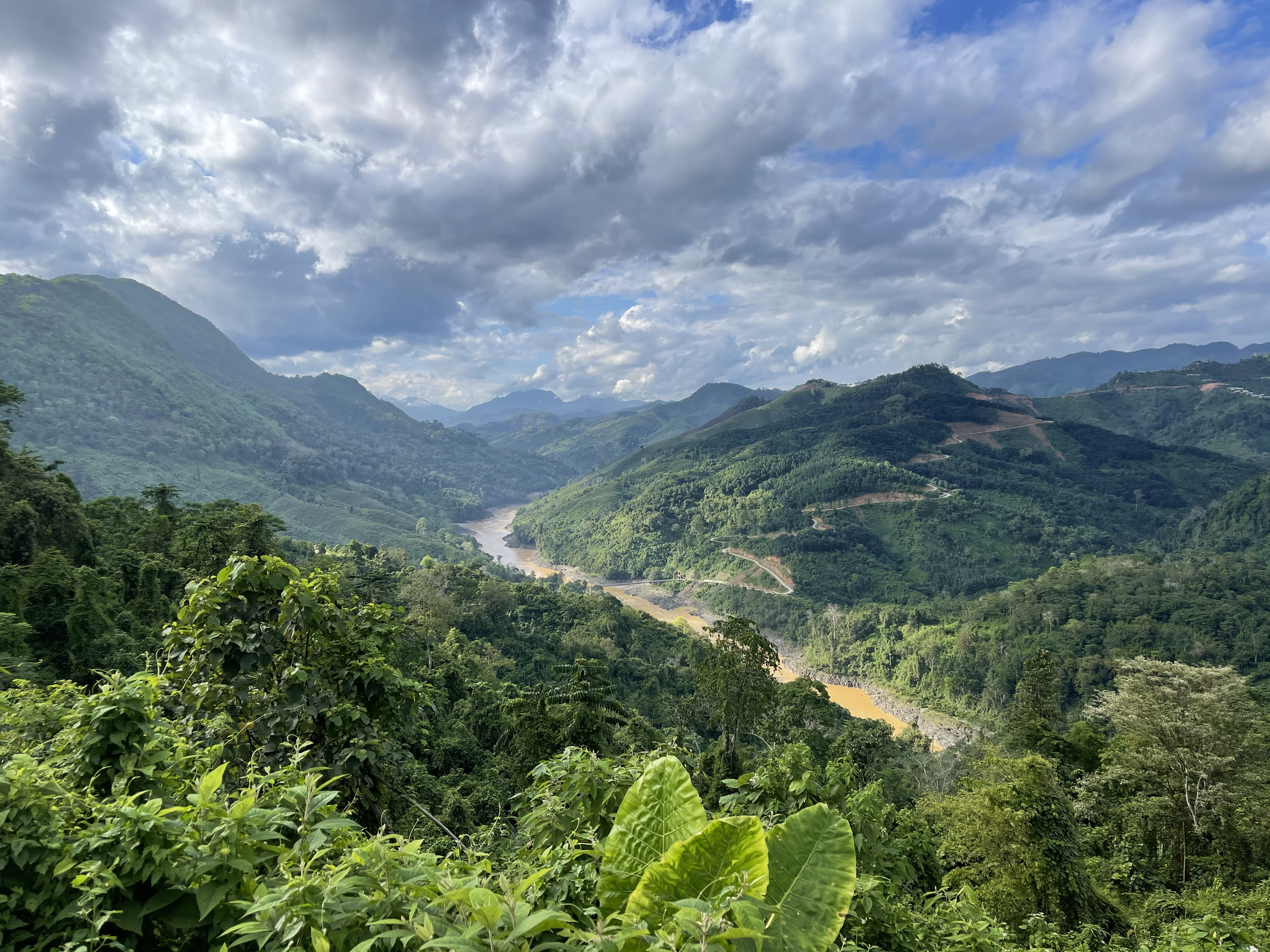
- View of Salween River in Tangyan Township

- Location in Tangyan district (in red)
- Coordinates: 22°29′0″N 98°23′0″E
- Country: Myanmar
- State: Shan State
- District: Tangyan District
- Elevation: 3,100 ft (945 m)

Population (2014)
  - Total: 172,805
- Time zone: UTC+6:30 (MMT)

Tangyan Township is a township of Tangyan District in northern Shan State of eastern Burma. The principal town is Tangyan. Tangyan emerged as an important centre for Panthay people (Chinese Muslims originally from neighbouring Yunnan) in the mid-20th century, especially after the destruction of Panglong during World War II.

== History ==
There were clashes between Shan State Army (SSA) and Myanmar Army in Tangyan in 2011. Myanmar Army deployed local militias to monitor the SSA movement. SSA accused Myanmar Army of using chemical weapons and recruiting women as forced porters in Tangyan during resume clashes. Some school teachers were killed also.

Beginning on 6 October 2015 a large-scale offensive by the Tatmadaw comprising 20 Burma Army battalions has been launched in central Shan State. The aim of the military is to seize Shan ceasefire territories in Kehsi, Mong Nawng, Mong Hsu and Tangyan townships, using heavy artillery and with fighter jet and helicopter gunship air support to indiscriminately shell and bomb civilian areas. These attacks have displaced thousands of Shan, Palaung, Lisu and Lahu people causing a new humanitarian crisis.

Starting on 10 July 2024, the United Wa State Army entered Tangyan after negotiations with the State Administration Council to prevent Operation 1027 from reaching Tangyan and the town of Mongyai

== Towns and villages ==
- Ha-mö
- Hatpawt
- Hkawknoi
- Hkawkwo
- Hko-lawn
- Hko-tawng
- Hko-yao
- Ho-kat
- Ho-kaw
- Holan
- Ho-mun
- Ho-na
- Ho-nam (22°42'0"N 98°13'0"E)
- Ho-nam (22°35'0"N 98°23'0"E)
- Ho-nam (22°4'0"N 98°25'0"E)
- Ho-pang
- Ho-ta
- Hpa-hping
- Hpakkom
- Hsai-hkao
- Hsophi
- Hungmang
- Hwe-kut
- Hwe-lawt
- Kangmöng
- Kattau
- Kawnghsang
- Kawngkaw
- Kawngkeng
- Kawnglang
- Kawnglangyokma
- Konglong
- Kongmöng
- Kunghsa
- Kungkut
- Kunglom
- Kungmong
- Kungpao
- Kungwet
- Kwanhio
- Kyawnglöng
- Loi-hkan
- Loi-hsang
- Loi-hseng
- Loi-kang
- Loi-metyin
- Loi-pāng
- Loi-pek
- Loi-tong
- Loi-waw
- Loi-weng
- Long-kaw
- Longwai
- Lukhkai
- Lunpok
- Makhki-nu
- Makhpai
- Māklāng
- Makmu
- Mān Anghkōng
- Mān Hkam
- Mān Hko-hsan
- Mān Ho-tawm
- Mān Hō-tung
- Mān Hpa-hpüng
- Mān Hsan
- Mān Hwe-keng
- Mān Hwe-koi
- Mān-kao-lōng (22°23'0"N 98°36'0"E)
- Mān-kao-long (22°23'0"N 98°29'0"E)
- Mān Kāt (22°33'0"N 98°12'0"E)
- Mān Kāt (22°30'0"N 98°32'0"E)
- Mān Kawng (22°28'0"N 98°18'0"E)
- Mān Kawng (22°14'0"N 98°22'0"E)
- Mān Kawnghsang
- Mān Kawngke
- Mān Kawngkwa
- Mān Kawnglēng
- Mān Kawngmu
- Mān Kawngnoi
- Mān Kok
- Mān Kūmkai
- Mān Kun
- Mān Kunglongmu
- Mān Kunmawng
- Mān Kuntōn
- Mān Kyawng (22°55'0"N 98°32'0"E)
- Mān Kyawng (22°28'0"N 98°18'0"E)
- Mān Kyawng (22°5'0"N 98°36'0"E)
- Mān Kyawng (22°1'0"N 98°35'0"E)
- Mān Laphpa
- Mān Linlēng
- Mān Loi
- Mān Loi-hkwang
- Mān Loi-hpwe
- Mān Loi-se
- Mān Longküt
- Mān Longmung
- Mān Longpoi
- Mān Lungkeng
- Mān Mak (22°54'0"N 98°27'0"E)
- Mān Mak (22°32'0"N 98°27'0"E)
- Mān Makmau
- Mān Maktoi
- Mān Mawkhsio
- Mān Myetme
- Mān Na
- Mān Na-hang
- Mān Na-hpü
- Mān Na-i
- Mān Na-kaw
- Mān Na-lin
- Mān Namhkan
- Mān Namhkong
- Mān Namhpen
- Mān Namhtawn
- Mān Namkawn
- Mān Namkin
- Mān Namlao
- Mān Namlawk
- Mān Namluk
- Mān Namlüt
- Mān Nammu-hse
- Mān Namngat
- Mān Nam Pawt
- Mān Nampunpan
- Mān Namsawk
- Mān Namtai
- Mān Namtawng
- Mān Na-ngan
- Mān Na-noi
- Mān Na-ping
- Mān Na-sü
- Mān Naü-kiu
- Mān Na-ūn
- Mān Nawng (22°51'0"N 98°32'0"E)
- Mān Nawng (22°41'0"N 98°31'0"E)
- Mān Nawngleng
- Mān Nawngloi
- Mān Nawngping
- Mān Nawngsang
- Mān Nga-taü
- Mān Ngatau
- Mān Pa-hpang
- Mān Pāng
- Mān Panghai
- Mān Panghpe
- Mān Panghpü
- Mān Panghsiu
- Mān Pangküt
- Mān Panglao
- Mān Pāngleng
- Mān Pāngmut
- Mān Pangngū
- Mān Pangpek
- Mān Pangsük
- Mān Pangwo
- Mān Pang-ya
- Mān Pang-yok
- Mān Peng
- Mān Pengtawng
- Mān Ping (22°51'0"N 98°30'0"E)
- Mān Ping (22°38'0"N 98°33'0"E)
- Mān Plawng
- Mān Saknamtut
- Mān San
- Mān Sannampüng
- Mān Sao-hpak
- Mān Se-le
- Mān Tap
- Mān Ta-pangmū
- Mān Ta-pi
- Mān Tawngkaw
- Mān Tawngseng
- Mān Tawniu
- Mān Wan
- Mān Wan-āwk
- Mān Wong
- Mān Wünhseng
- Mān Yan
- Mawlek
- Mong kung
- Möng Kao
- Möng Keng
- Möng Ma
- Möng Nawng
- Möng Ngong
- Möng Pat
- Möng Tawm
- Na-hin
- Na-hkai
- Na-hkak
- Na-hok (22°31'0"N 98°14'0"E)
- Na-hok (22°5'0"N 98°19'0"E)
- Na-hon
- Na-hsang
- Na-hse
- Na-hung
- Na-hwe
- Na-kaw
- Na-law
- Nā-long
- Nā-lu
- Na-mawn
- Namhkam
- Namhkomhpa
- Namhsai-tao
- Namhsawk
- Namhsim (22°44'0"N 98°7'0"E)
- Namhsim (22°40'0"N 98°21'0"E)
- Namhu
- Namkat
- Namlawt
- Namlin
- Nammaklawt
- Namnawng
- Na-möng (22°51'0"N 98°6'0"E)
- Na-möng (22°37'0"N 98°12'0"E)
- Nampat
- Nampeng
- Nampung
- Namsen
- Namsēng
- Namsu
- Namti
- Nam-un
- Nam-yawn
- Nangwe
- Na-niu
- Nā-tawng
- Na-ti
- Na-tu
- Nawnghi
- Nawnghio
- Nawng Hkam
- Nawnghkio
- Nawng Hpa
- Nawnghpai
- Nawnghpeng
- Nawnghsau
- Nawngkut
- Nawngkyang
- Nawngleng (22°50'0"N 98°25'0"E)
- Nawngleng (22°48'0"N 98°15'0"E)
- Nawngleng (22°16'0"N 98°25'0"E)
- Nawngmawn
- Nawngnai
- Nawngngu
- Nawngsa-lüm
- Nawngsang (22°43'0"N 98°20'0"E)
- Nawngsang (22°19'0"N 98°22'0"E)
- Nawngyun
- Pa-hsa
- Pa-kawlam
- Pānghai (22°48'0"N 98°11'0"E)
- Pānghai (22°11'0"N 98°21'0"E)
- Panghka-lwe
- Pānghkam
- Pānghpa
- Pānghsai
- Pānghung (22°24'0"N 98°19'0"E)
- Pānghung (22°22'0"N 98°23'0"E)
- Pāng-ing
- Pānglang
- Pānglong (22°32'0"N 98°13'0"E)
- Pānglong (22°28'0"N 98°21'0"E)
- Pāng-oi
- Pāngpao
- Pāngpen
- Pāngpoi
- Pangsong (22°25'0"N 98°14'0"E)
- Pāngsong (22°17'0"N 98°22'0"E)
- Pāngwa
- Pāngwawk
- Pāngwo-lai
- Pāng-yao
- Pa-sang
- Pa-tep
- Penghkan
- Poklao
- Ponghao
- Pung-hsang
- Pungpang
- Ta Hsaileng
- Ta-kai
- Ta Kawngpong
- Tangyan
- Tawnghio
- Tungpok
- Tunhong
- Wān Hai-lai
- Wān Hkampng
- Wān Hpa-höng
- Wān Hsoppaw
- Wān Loi
- Wān Mākwan
- Wān Namlap
- Wān Nampaw
- Wān Pawngto
- Wenghong
- Wengkaw
- Weng Kwai
- Wengmau
- Yawnglong
