= Mawgyan =

- Location in Burma
- Coordinates: 24°24′N 96°49′E
- Country: Burma
- State: Kachin State
- District: Bhamo District
- Township: Shwegu Township

Population
  - Religions: Buddhism
- Time zone: UTC+6.30 (UTC + 6:30)

Mawgyan is a village in Shwegu Township in Bhamo District in the Kachin State of north-eastern Burma.
