= Kan Gyi =

Kan Gyi ကံကြီး Kangyi
- Location in Burma
- Coordinates: 24°12′27″N 97°14′04″E
- Country: Burma
- State: Kachin State
- District: Bhamo District
- Township: Bhamo Township

Population
  - Religions: Buddhism
- Time zone: UTC+6.30 (UTC + 6:30)

Kan Gyi is a village in Bhamo Township in Bhamo District in the Kachin State of north-eastern Burma.
