= Har Hkin =

Har Hkin ဟာခင်း Hakkhan
- Location in Burma
- Coordinates: 24°19′00″N 97°09′45″E
- Country: Myanmar
- State: Kachin State
- District: Bhamo District
- Township: Bhamo Township

Population (2005)
  - Religions: Buddhism
- Time zone: UTC+6.30 (UTC + 6:30)

Har Hkin is a village in Bhamo Township in Bhamo District in the Kachin State of north-eastern Myanmar.
