= Man Hkan Yi Hku =

Man Hkan Yi Hku မံခံရေခူး Man Kham, Yi Hku Man Hkan (ရီခူမန်ခန်)
- Location in Burma
- Coordinates: 24°06′45″N 97°15′06″E
- Country: Burma
- State: Kachin State
- District: Bhamo District
- Township: Mansi Township

Population
  - Religions: Buddhism
- Time zone: UTC+6.30 (UTC + 6:30)

Man Hkan Yi Hku is a village in Mansi Township in Bhamo District in the Kachin State of north-eastern Burma.
