= Maran, Myanmar =

- Location in Myanmar
- Coordinates: 24°14′N 97°21′E
- Country: Myanmar
- State: Kachin State
- District: Bhamo District
- Township: Bhamo Township

Population
  - Religions: Buddhism
- Time zone: UTC+6.30 (UTC + 6:30)

Maran, Myanmar is a village in Bhamo Township in Bhamo District in the Kachin State of north-eastern Myanmar.
