= Man Pong =

Man Pong မံပုံ Man Bung
- Location in Burma
- Coordinates: 24°14′11″N 97°19′27″E
- Country: Burma
- State: Kachin State
- District: Bhamo District
- Township: Momauk Township

Population (2005)
  - Religions: Buddhism
- Time zone: UTC+6.30 (UTC + 6:30)

Man Pong is a village in Momauk Township in Bhamo District in the Kachin State of north-eastern Burma.
