= Kawnan =

- Location in Burma
- Coordinates: 24°26′N 97°12′E
- Country: Burma
- State: Kachin State
- District: Bhamo District
- Township: Bhamo Township

Population (2005)
  - Religions: Buddhism
- Time zone: UTC+6.30 (UTC + 6:30)

Kawnan is a village in Bhamo Township in Bhamo District in the Kachin State of north-eastern Burma.

== Geography ==
The village of Kawnan is located in the northeast of Burma within Kachin State, and it is part of the isolated rural mountainous areas in the northern part of the country.

The village lies within the Northern Arakan Mountains, at an elevation of approximately 962 meters above sea level, and is surrounded by dense mountain forests and small plains partially used for traditional agriculture and grazing. The area is rugged and mountainous, relatively far from major urban centers in Myanmar, with rural roads connecting it to nearby villages and small towns.
