= Aungthar Gone =

Village in Kachin State, Myanmar

Aung Thar Kone အောင်သာကုန်း
- Location in Myanmar
- Coordinates: 24°14′46″N 97°18′32″E
- Country: Myanmar
- State: Kachin State
- District: Bhamo District
- Township: Momauk Township
- Village Tract: Manpong

Population (2005)
  - Religions: Buddhism
- Time zone: UTC+6.30 (UTC + 6:30)

Aungthar Kone is a village in Momauk Township in Bhamo District in the Kachin State of north-eastern Myanmar. It is also known as Awngsa in the Kachin language.
