= Man Ma Kauk =

Man Ma Kauk မံမကောက်
- Location in Burma
- Coordinates: 24°05′54″N 97°11′28″E
- Country: Burma
- State: Kachin State
- District: Bhamo District
- Township: Mansi Township

Population
  - Religions: Buddhism
- Time zone: UTC+6.30 (UTC + 6:30)

Man Ma Kauk is a village in Mansi Township in Bhamo District in the Kachin State of north-eastern Burma.
