= Kan Ba Ni =

Kan Ba Ni ကမ္ဘနီ Kabani
- Location in Burma
- Coordinates: 24°12′15″N 97°15′05″E
- Country: Burma
- State: Kachin State
- District: Bhamo District
- Township: Bhamo Township

Population (2005)
  - Religions: Buddhism
- Time zone: UTC+6.30 (UTC + 6:30)

Kan Ba Ni is a village in Bhamo Township in Bhamo District in the Kachin State of north-eastern Burma.
