= Pahok =

Pahok is the name of several villages in Burma:

- Pahok, Bhamo
- Pahok, Homalin
