= Kyun Taw =

Kyun Taw ကျွန်းတော် Kyundaw
- Location in Burma
- Coordinates: 24°12′32″N 96°49′19″E
- Country: Burma
- State: Kachin State
- District: Bhamo District
- Township: Shwegu Township

Population
  - Religions: Buddhism
- Time zone: UTC+6.30 (UTC + 6:30)

Kyun Taw is a village in Shwegu Township in Bhamo District in the Kachin State of northeastern Burma.
