= Yele =

Yele may refer to:

- Yele, Shwegu -Kachin State, Burma
- Yele, Bo District, in Bo District, Sierra Leone
- Yele, Tonkolili District, in Tonkolili District, Sierra Leone
- Yéle Haiti Foundation
- Yele language
- "Yele", a song by Wyclef Jean from the 1997 album Wyclef Jean Presents The Carnival
