= Let Pan Tan =

Let Pan Tan လက်ပန်တန်း Letpandan
- Location in Burma
- Coordinates: 24°12′05″N 97°09′30″E
- Country: Burma
- State: Kachin State
- District: Bhamo District
- Township: Bhamo Township

Population (2005)
  - Religions: Buddhism
- Time zone: UTC+6.30 (UTC + 6:30)

Let Pan Tan is a village in Bhamo Township in Bhamo District in the Kachin State of north-eastern Burma.

Indian Communist leader And Former General Secretary Of CPIM Prakash Karat was born here.
