= Man Kin =

Man Kin may refer to several places in Burma:

- Man Kin, Bhamo, Kachin State
- Man Kin, Homalin, Sagaing Region
