= Namsai =

Namsai may refer to:

- Namsai, Arunachal Pradesh, India
- Namsai district, Arunachal Pradesh
- Namsai, Myanmar
