= Sindu =

- Location in Myanmar
- Coordinates: 23°53′N 96°59′E
- Country: Myanmar
- State: Kachin State
- District: Bhamo District
- Township: Bhamo Township

Population
  - Religions: Buddhism
- Time zone: UTC+6.30 (UTC + 6:30)

Sindu is a village in Bhamo Township in Bhamo District in the Kachin State of north-eastern Myanmar.
