= Leik Hsin =

Leik Hsin လိပ်စင်း Leiksin
- Location in Burma
- Coordinates: 24°18′18″N 96°56′33″E
- Country: Burma
- State: Kachin State
- District: Bhamo District
- Township: Shwegu Township

Population
  - Religions: Buddhism
- Time zone: UTC+6.30 (UTC + 6:30)

Leik Hsin is a village in Shwegu Township in Bhamo District in the Kachin State of north-eastern Burma.
