= Man Nawng =

Man Nawng မန်နောင် Man Naung
- Location in Burma
- Coordinates: 24°24′36″N 97°19′18″E
- Country: Burma
- State: Kachin State
- District: Bhamo District
- Township: Momauk Township

Population
  - Religions: Buddhism
- Time zone: UTC+6.30 (UTC + 6:30)

Man Nawng is a village in Momauk Township in Bhamo District in the Kachin State of north-eastern Burma.
