= Simaw =

SImaw may refer to:

- Simaw, Banmauk
- Simaw, Shwegu
