= Walu =

Walu may refer to:

- Walu, Burma
- Hawaiian term for escolar, a fish
- WaLu Martial arts, a Chinese Martial Arts System
- Walu, Australian Aboriginal goddess
