= Nyaunggon =

Nyaunggon is the name of several villages in Burma:

- Nyaunggon, Bhamo
- Nyaunggon, Homalin
- Nyaunggon, Mingin
