= Naungyin =

Naungyin may refer to:

- Naungyin, Shwegu, a village in Kachin State, Burma
- Naungyin, Homalin, a village in Sagaing Region, Burma
- Naungyin, Lawksawk, a village in Shan State, Burma
