= Kyun-u =

Kyun-u may refer to several places in Burma:

- Kyun-u, Bhamo in Kachin State
- Kyun-u, Homalin in Sagaing Region
