= Tangyan District =

District in Shan State, Myanmar

Tangyan District တန့်ယန်းခရိုင်
- Tangyan District (Red) in Shan State
- Coordinates: 22.359°N 98.218°E
- Country: Myanmar
- Region: Shan State
- Capital: Tangyan
- Time zone: MMT

Tangyan District (Burmese: တန့်ယန်းခရိုင်, also Tang Yang District) is a district in northern Shan State, Myanmar. It was split from Lashio District on 30 April 2022 and contains two townships. Its district seat is Tangyan.

== Townships ==
Townships in Mong Hsu District:

- Tangyan Township
- Mongyai Township
