= Opposition to the India–United States Civil Nuclear Agreement in India =

The India–United States Civil Nuclear Agreement was met with stiff opposition by some political parties and activists in India. Although many mainstream political parties including the Indian National Congress support the deal along with regional parties like Dravida Munnetra Kazhagam and Rashtriya Janata Dal its realisation has run into difficulties in the face of stiff political opposition in India. Also, in November 2007, former Indian Military chiefs, bureaucrats and scientists drafted a letter to Members of Parliament expressing their support for the deal. However, opposition and criticism continued at political levels. The Samajwadi Party (SP) which was with the Left Front in opposing the deal changed its stand after discussing with ex-president of India and scientist Dr A P J Abdul Kalam. Now the SP is in support of the government and the deal. The Indian Government survived a vote of confidence by 275-256 after the Left Front withdrew their support to the government over this dispute.

== Political opposition ==
Detailed timeline
India United States
- July 18, 2005: Manmohan Singh and George W. Bush announced to work on nuclear deal in Washington.
- March 2, 2006: During Bush's visit to New Delhi, India and USA sign formally to work on nuclear agreement.
- March 11, 2006: Left parties attacks United Progressive Alliance-led government terming it as 'unequal' during a special session of Lok Sabha saying Indian nuclear program would go in jeopardy.
- July 28, 2006: The Left Front demands detailed discussion on the deal in Indian Parliament.
- November 16, 2006: US Senate passes the Indo-US nuclear deal.
- August 3, 2007: India and US unveil the 123 Agreement.
- August 13, 2007: Indian Prime Minister makes his own statement on the deal in Parliament.
- August 17, 2007: Left parties declare 'honeymoon (with government) may be over but the marriage can go on' indicating that UPA government is heading for rough days ahead.
- September 4, 2007: UPA-Left committee discuss nuclear deal with no consensus.
- November 16, 2007: Left parties demand that the government release the full text of the deal.
- February 25, 2008: Left parties say the UPA would have to choose between the deal and its government's stability.
- March 3, 2008: Left parties warn UPA led government if nuclear deal with the US is operationalized by approaching the IAEA.
- March 6, 2008: Left parties set a deadline asking the government to make it clear by March 15 if they are going to approach the IAEA or put down the deal.
- March 7, 2008: Communist Party of India warns Manmohan Singh of withdrawal of support to government if IAEA is approached with nuclear safeguard agreement.
- March 8, 2008: Communist Party of India (Marxist) (CPI (M)) says the government should scrap the nuclear deal if the UPA-Left Committee does not approve it.
- March 14, 2008: CPI (M) says all Left parties will not be responsible if the government falls over the nuclear deal. Bharatiya Janata Party (BJP) had earlier said it would vote against the government.
- April 23, 2008: Government says it will seek the consensus of the Lok Sabha on the 123 Agreement before it is taken up to the American Congress.
- June 17, 2008: Pranab Mukherjee meets Prakash Karat asking the Left's permission to allow the government to go ahead with IAEA safeguards agreement.
- June 30, 2008: Prime Minister says his government prepare to face Parliament before it will operationalize the deal.
- July 1, 2008: Samajwadi Party, former rival, comes out to support the government in case of trust of vote.
- July 3, 2008: The Left parties decide to work out the timing and modalities of the pullout.
- July 8, 2008: Left parties withdraw support to government.
- July 9, 2008: India approaches IAEA with nuclear safeguard agreement.
- July 22, 2008: UPA led government wins trust vote in Lok Sabha over the debate on nuclear agreement.
Key political parties of India

=== Bharatiya Janata Party ===
The main opposition party Bharatiya Janata Party (BJP) which laid the groundwork for the deal criticized the deal saying that the deal in its present form was unacceptable to the BJP and wanted the deal renegotiated. The BJP had asked the government not to accept the deal without a vote in the parliament. However, the government remained steadfast on its commitment to the deal and has refused to back down on the agreement. Veteran BJP leader Lal Krishna Advani, in a statement to the Indian Express newspaper, seemed to indicate willingness to support the government provided some legislative measures. However his party refused to follow that line and stuck to its earlier stand.

==== Supply of uranium and testing-bans ====
IBN reported:

The Indo-US civil nuclear deal is in the news once again after US President George W Bush commented that fuel supply assurances to India are not legally binding. Bush's remark has even intrigued New Delhi with the Opposition raising doubts once again. "The assurance of uninterrupted supply of fissile material uranium is the biggest question mark that has come. The other big question mark relates to testing," senior BJP leader Jaswant Singh remarked.

=== Left Front ===
The primary opposition to the nuclear deal in India, however, comes from the Communist Party of India (Marxist) (CPI(M))and its parliamentary allies (Communist Party of India, Revolutionary Socialist Party (India), All India Forward Bloc) November 17 the left parties had provisionally agreed to let the government initiate talks with the IAEA for India specific safeguards which indicated that they may support. The CPI(M), an external parliamentary supporter of government as it stipulates conditions that in some areas are more severe than the clauses in either the NPT or the CTBT. They alleged that the deal would undermine the sovereignty of India's foreign policy and also claimed that the Indian government was hiding certain clauses of the deal, which would harm India's indigenous nuclear program, from the media. On July 9, 2008, the Left Front withdrew support to the government reducing its strength to 276 in the Lok Sabha (the lower house of the parliament). The government survived a confidence vote in the parliament on July 22, 2008 by 275-256 votes in the backdrop of defections from both camps to the opposite camps.

=== United Nationalist Progressive Alliance (UNPA) ===
The United Nationalist Progressive Alliance (UNPA) was divided over support of the nuclear deal. While the Samajwadi Party supported it after consultations with Abdul Kalam, the other members of the UNPA led by the Telugu Desam Party (TDP) opposed it saying that the deal is against India's interest. The SP was eventually suspended from the UNPA.

=== Bahujan Samaj Party ===
The Bahujan Samaj Party (BSP) also opposed the nuclear deal. The party joined hands with the Left Front and the TDP in voting against the government in Parliament on the nuclear deal.

=== Others ===
In 2006, some Indian ex-nuclear scientists had written an appeal to Indian Members of Parliament to ensure that "decisions taken today do not inhibit India's future ability to develop and pursue nuclear technologies for the benefit of the nation".

Various Indian political and scientific personalities have repeatedly expressed concerns that the United States may use the India-US civilian nuclear agreement as a diplomatic weapon if Indian foreign policy was not in conformity with geopolitical interests of the US.

== See also ==
- 2008 Lok Sabha vote of confidence
- Cash-for-votes scandal
