= Na-hpan =

- Village
- Location in Burma
- Coordinates: 22°39′6″N 97°52′30″E
- Country: Burma
- Division: Shan State
- District: Lashio District
- Township: Mongyai Township
- Elevation: 1,991 ft (607 m)

Population
  - Ethnicities: Shan
- Time zone: UTC+6.30 (MST)

Na-hpan is a village in Mongyai Township, Shan State.

== Geography ==
Na-hpan is located west of the Salween, 20 km to the west of Loi Leng mountain.
