= Kyauk Ta Lone =

Kyauk Ta Lone ကျောက်တလုံး Kyauktalon
- Location in Burma
- Coordinates: 24°17′26″N 96°46′30″E
- Country: Burma
- State: Kachin State
- District: Bhamo District
- Township: Shwegu Township

Population
  - Religions: Buddhism
- Time zone: UTC+6.30 (UTC + 6:30)

Kyauk Ta Lone is a village in Shwegu Township in Bhamo District in the Kachin State of north-eastern Burma.
