= Mansi, Myanmar =

Mansi မန်စီမြို့ ဝဵင်းမၢၼ်ႈၸေ
- Town
- Location in Burma
- Coordinates: 24°7′0″N 97°18′0″E
- Country: Myanmar
- Division: Kachin State
- District: Bhamo District
- Township: Mansi Township

Population
  - Religions: Buddhism
- Time zone: UTC+6.30 (MST)

Mansi (Burmese: မန်စီမြို့) is a town in Bhamo District, Kachin State in the northernmost part of Myanmar (Burma). Mansi is connected by the National Highway 31 from the south and is the western terminus of the National Road 36 which connects Mansi to Muse on the Chinese border in the east. During the Myanmar civil war, the town came under attack by the Kachin Independence Army (KIA) in May 2024. Following around 8 months of sporadic fighting, the town was captured by the KIA on 8 January 2025.

== Names ==
Mansi means "village of cicadas" (Shan: ဝဵင်းမၢၼ်ႈၸေ) in Shan.
