= Prakash Karat =

Indian politician (born 1948)

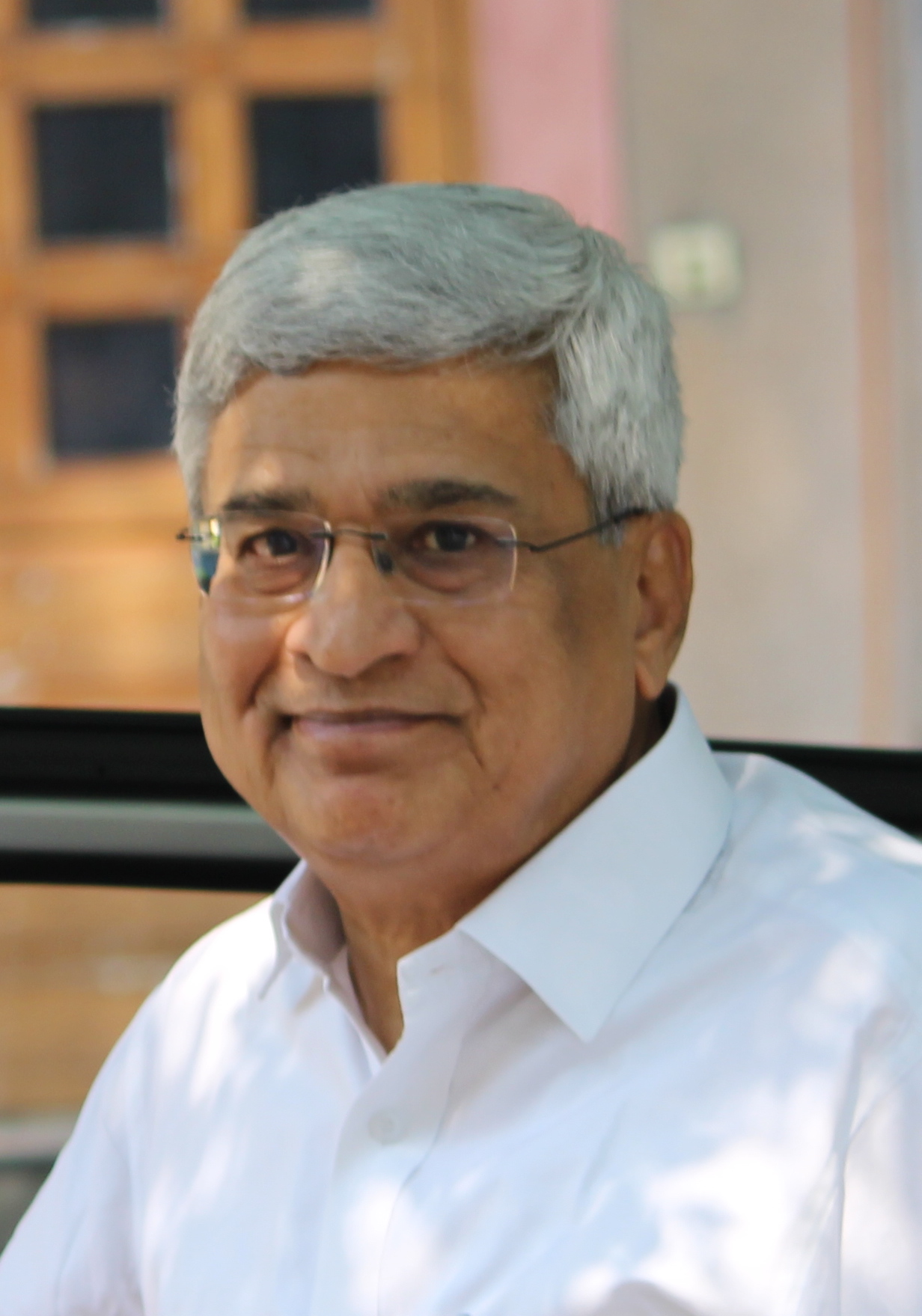
- Prakash Karat

Member of the Polit Bureau of the Communist Party of India (Marxist)
- In office 10 January 1992 – 6 April 2025

General Secretary of the Communist Party of India (Marxist)
- In office 11 April 2005 – 19 April 2015
- Preceded by: Harkishan Singh Surjeet
- Succeeded by: Sitaram Yechury

Interim Coordinator, Communist Party of India (Marxist)
- In office 29 September 2024 – 6 April 2025

Personal details
- Born: 7 February 1948 (age 78) Letpandan, Kachin State, Burma
- Party: Communist Party of India (Marxist)
- Spouse: Brinda Karat (m. 1975)
- Relatives: Radhika Roy (sister-in-law)
- Education: University of Madras; University of Edinburgh; Jawaharlal Nehru University

Prakash Karat (born 7 February 1948) is an Indian Communist politician. He was the general secretary of the Communist Party of India (Marxist) from 2005 to 2015. He served as interim coordinator of CPI(M) after the death of incumbent General Secretary Sitaram Yechury.

== Early life and education ==
Prakash Karat was born in Letpadan, Burma, on 7 February 1948, to a Nair family. His father worked as a clerk in the Burma Railways, where he had sought employment during the British Raj. Karat's family hailed from Elappully, Palakkad, Kerala. He lived in Palakkad till the age of five before returning to Burma where he lived with his family till the age of nine, when his family left Burma and returned to India in 1957.

Karat studied at the Madras Christian College Higher Secondary School in Chennai. On finishing school, he won the first prize in an all-India essay competition on the Tokyo Olympics. He was sent on a ten-day visit to the Tokyo Olympics in 1964 as a result. He went to the Madras Christian College, Chennai as an undergraduate student in economics, winning the prize for best all-round student on graduation.

Encouraged by the Scottish theologian Duncan B. Forrester, one of his college professors, he got a scholarship to Britain's University of Edinburgh, for a master's degree in politics. In 1970, he received an MSc degree from the University of Edinburgh for the thesis "Language and Politics in Modern India". At Edinburgh he became active in student politics and met Professor Victor Kiernan, the well-known Marxist historian. His political activism began with anti-apartheid protests at the university, for which he was rusticated. The rustication was later suspended on good behaviour.

== Political career ==
Karat returned to India in 1970 and joined Jawaharlal Nehru University, New Delhi. He worked as an aide to A.K. Gopalan, the communist leader from Kerala and leader of the CPI(M) group in Parliament from 1971 to 1973, while doing his Ph.D. in JNU. Karat was one of the founders of the Students Federation of India (SFI), in Jawaharlal Nehru University. He was involved with student politics and was elected the third president of the Jawaharlal Nehru University Students' Union. He also became the President of the Students Federation of India between 1974 and 1979. During this period his associates included N. Ram, later editor of The Hindu daily, the radical women's activist Mythili Sivaraman and, less closely, P. Chidambaram, who later became India's finance minister. He worked underground for one and a half years during the Emergency in India in 1975–76. He was arrested twice and spent eight days in prison.

He was the secretary of the Delhi State Committee of the CPI(M) from 1982 to 1985. Karat was elected to the CPI(M) Central Committee in 1985 and became a member of the CPI(M) Politburo in 1992. He took over as the CPI(M) general secretary in 2005 at the 18th Congress of the party held in Delhi. During his era the Communist Part of India (Marxist) saw a sharp decline in its mass appeal due to his rigid behaviour on party line. Karat had purportedly lobbied the CPI(M) politburo against the prime ministerial candidature of Jyoti Basu in the aftermath of the collapse of the First Vajpayee ministry shortly after the 1996 elections(despite support of the General Secretary Harkishan Singh Surjeet), arguing that it violated the principle of dictatorship of the proletariat, a decision which has been dubbed as a 'historic blunder'. Following the 2004 elections, Karat was involved in providing outside support of the CPI(M) to the Indian National Congress led UPA-I government. But in 2008 Karat negotiated withdrawal of CPI(M) support from the government due to opposition to the Indo-US Nuclear Deal, motivated largely by his personal dislike for the US and its president George W. Bush. This triggerred a no-confidence vote, which the government survived. Under Karat's tenure, CPI(M) lost West Bengal in 2011 where it had ruled for 34 unbroken years. Karat admitted that the defeat was largely due to the controversy at Singur.

He was succeeded by Sitaram Yechury in 2015 at the 21st party Congress held in Visakhapatnam.

After the sudden demise of Sitaram Yechury on 12 September 2024, Karat was chosen as interim coordinator of the Politburo and the Central Committee of CPI(M) on 29 September 2024.

=== Lok Sabha Election Results during tenure of Karat as general secretary ===
Performance of Communist Party of India (Marxist) in Lok Sabha elections
Lok Sabha	Year	Lok Sabha constituencies	Seats contested	Won	Net change in seats	Votes	Votes %	Change in vote %	Reference
Fifteenth	2009	543	82	16	▼27	22,219,111	5.33%	▼0.33%	
Sixteenth	2014	543	97	9	▼7	17,986,773	3.24%	▼2.09%	

== Personal life ==
He is married to activist-politician Brinda Karat. They got married on 7 November 1975. The couple has no children.

== Academic and political writings ==
He has authored studies and articles on political developments, which have been published in several newspapers and journals.

His research on agrarian relations in the Malabar region of Kerala has garnered attention and discussion within academic circles, including his post-graduate thesis, ‘Language and politics in Modern India’.

Since 1992, Karat has been on the editorial board of CPI(M)'s academic journal, The Marxist. He is the managing director of Naya Rasta Publishers, the parent company of Leftword Books. He is the author of several books.

- Language, Nationality and Politics in India (1972)
- A World to Win—Essays on the Communist Manifesto (1999), edited
- Across Time and Continents: A tribute to Victor Kiernan (2003), edited
- Subordinate Ally: The nuclear deal and India-US strategic relations (2008)
- Politics and policies(2008)
- Revolution! Lenin in 1917 (edited) (2017)
