= Maha =

Maha and MAHA may refer to:

- Maha (name), an Arabic feminine given name
- Maha (film), an Indian Tamil-language thriller film
- MaHa, Nepali comedy duo, Madan Krishna Shrestha and Hari Bansha Acharya
- Make America Healthy Again (MAHA), the colloquial branding of Robert F. Kennedy Jr.'s political platform in conjunction with the Donald Trump 2024 presidential campaign, introduced in July 2024
- Maha Music Festival, an annual music festival held on the riverfront in Omaha, Nebraska
- Microangiopathic hemolytic anemia (MAHA), a microangiopathic subgroup of hemolytic anemia
- Omaha (tribe), also known as Maha tribe
- Mahas, a Nubian tribe of the Sudan
- maha-, a prefix meaning "great" in Sanskrit and Pali honorific titles such as Maharaja, Maharani, Mahathera, Mahatma, Maharashtra
- Hockey Manitoba, formerly known as the Manitoba Amateur Hockey Association
- Mäha, village in Otepää Parish, Valga County, Estonia
- A Three Stooges comedy routine from Three Little Pirates and Time Out For Rhythm

== See also ==
- Mahat (disambiguation)
- Mahatma (disambiguation)
