= Mongyai Township =

Mongyai Township မိုင်းရယ်မြို့နယ်
- Township
- Location in Tangyan district (in red)
- Coordinates: 22°24′0″N 98°2′0″E
- Country: Myanmar
- State: Shan State
- District: Tangyan District
- Elevation: 2,858 ft (871 m)
- Time zone: UTC+6:30 (MMT)

Mongyai Township is a township of Tangyan District in northern Shan State of eastern Myanmar. The principal town is Mongyai. Mount Loi Leng (1,823 m) of Mongyai is the highest point in Shan State.

== History ==
Historically Mong Yai was the capital of South Hsenwi state. Sao Hso Holm, ex-saopha of Mongyai was one of the founders of Shan Nationalities League for Democracy in October 1988. Khun Sa was born in Loi Maw of Mongyai Township at 17 February 1934.

There were several skirmishes between Myanmar Army and Shan State Army in Mongyai during 2011. On 12 July 2024, the Shan State Progress Party took control of the town after the military ceded it to prevent fighting spilling over from Operation 1027.

== Towns and villages ==
- Hai-ko
- Hai-pu
- Hang-hsio
- Hapa-palang
- Hatlö
- Hat-yao
- Hau-ti
- Hio-hka
- Hkai-aw
- Hkai-lu
- Hkaimawn
- Hkam-yom
- Hkawnhkok
- Hko-hak
- Hko-lawn
- Hko-mong
- Hko-nim
- Hkö-tum
- Ho-hko (22°27'0"N 97°55'0"E)
- Ho-hko (22°16'0"N 97°58'0"E)
- Ho-hko-nam-hpak-lün
- Ho-hkong
- Ho-hwè
- Hok-la
- Ho-lan
- Ho-leng
- Ho-na
- Honghang
- Hongmon
- Ho-pong
- Ho-tawng
- Ho-tu
- Hpa-hin
- Hpa-hseng
- Hpakkom
- Hpaknam
- Hpanghpai
- Hpa-suk
- Hpa-tan
- Hsaihkao
- Hsai-kau
- Hsai-leng
- Hsentaw
- Hswe-hpu
- Hwe-hok
- Hwe-lawt
- Hwè-lü
- Ka-lo
- Kawng-hka
- Kawnghkam (22°32'0"N 97°58'0"E)
- Kawnghkam (22°30'0"N 97°56'0"E)
- Kawng-hōng (22°41'0"N 97°53'0"E)
- Kawng-hong (22°38'0"N 97°52'0"E)
- Kawnghsan
- Kawng-hsang
- Kawng-ke
- Kawng-sam (22°44'0"N 97°55'0"E)
- Kawng-sam (22°34'0"N 97°53'0"E)
- Kawng-sam (22°34'0"N 97°50'0"E)
- Kawng-up
- Kawngwit
- Kio-it
- Kio-wün
- Kōng-hsa
- Konghsa
- Kōng-möng
- Kongmong
- Kong-nio (22°42'0"N 97°54'0"E)
- Kōng-nio (22°35'0"N 97°56'0"E)
- Kongnio
- Kong-pau
- Kong-söng
- Kōng-wat
- Kunghkam
- Kunghsa
- Kung-kaw
- Kungsong
- Kungwit
- Kun-hio
- Kunkeng
- Kun-loi
- Laksang
- Lenti
- Lin-ten
- Loi-hkan
- Loihseng
- Loi-lungtung
- Loi-ngam
- Loi-ngun (22°36'0"N 97°52'0"E)
- Loi-ngün (22°23'0"N 97°53'0"E)
- Loi-sawng
- Loi-ywoi
- Löng-kawng
- Löngkwai
- Longtawng
- Luk-hkai
- Lukhkai
- Lukkaw
- Luk-maw-hkang
- Māklāng
- Māk-mon
- Māk-na
- Māngpung
- Mān Hawng
- Mān Hkum
- Mān Hpai (22°24'0"N 98°0'0"E)
- Mān Hpai (22°14'0"N 98°7'0"E)
- Mān Hpakkom
- Mān Hpit
- Mān Ka
- Mān-kau-lōng (22°30'0"N 97°51'0"E)
- Mān-kau-lōng (22°27'0"N 97°50'0"E)
- Mān Kaw-leng
- Mān Kio
- Mān Kun
- Mān Kyawng (22°26'0"N 98°5'0"E)
- Mān Kyawng (22°20'0"N 97°59'0"E)
- Mān Kyawng (22°13'0"N 98°4'0"E)
- Mān Kyawng (22°6'0"N 98°7'0"E)
- Mān Lang-ta
- Mān Lawng
- Mān Loi (22°31'0"N 98°6'0"E)
- Mān Loi (22°13'0"N 98°0'0"E)
- Mān Loi-ha
- Mān Loi-haw
- Mān Mau (22°36'0"N 97°50'0"E)
- Mān Maü (22°25'0"N 97°50'0"E)
- Mān Maü (22°17'0"N 98°14'0"E)
- Man Na-lai
- Man Nam-hu-hsim
- Mān Nawng (22°29'0"N 97°53'0"E)
- Mān Nawng (22°5'0"N 98°8'0"E)
- Mān Ngu-löm
- Mān Pāng (22°32'0"N 97°59'0"E)
- Mān Pang (22°22'0"N 98°11'0"E)
- Mān Pong
- Mānpung
- Mān Punghtun
- Mān Sang
- Mān Sau-hpak
- Mān Tap
- Mān Tawng-kaw
- Man Weng
- Mān Yawn
- Möng Ha
- Möng Heng
- Möng Kang
- Möng Kawng
- Möng Ngong
- Möng Yai
- Na-hi
- Nā-hio
- Nahkam
- Na-hko
- Nā-hok
- Na-hpan
- Na-hsai
- Nā-hsan
- Nā-hsang
- Na-long
- Na-ma-hio
- Na-maklang
- Nam-aw
- Nam-hawn
- Nam-hkum-hpa
- Namhsawm
- Namhsum
- Nam-hu (22°40'0"N 97°53'0"E)
- Nam-hu (22°37'0"N 97°51'0"E)
- Nam-hu (22°25'0"N 97°52'0"E)
- Namhu
- Namhu-hpa-lang
- Nam-hu-tai-hsan
- Namhu-un
- Nam-küt
- Namlin
- Namma
- Namma-kaw
- Namman
- Nammawhsom (22°36'0"N 97°48'0"E)
- Nammawhsom (22°20'0"N 97°52'0"E)
- Nā-mong
- Nampa-lum
- Nampawn
- Nampen
- Nampōk
- Nampot
- Namsam
- Nam-tung
- Nam-ün
- Na-mun
- Nam Ut
- Nam-yom
- Na-namhpa
- Na-ngu
- Nā-nio (22°33'0"N 97°50'0"E)
- Na-nio (22°28'0"N 97°55'0"E)
- Na-pan
- Na-sawk
- Na-si-ri
- Na-ti
- Na-tung
- Na-wa
- Nā-wi
- Nawnghawn
- Nawng-hket
- Nawnghkio
- Nawnghpakkut
- Nawngkaw
- Nawnglang
- Nawngleng
- Nawnglom
- Nawngmo
- Nawngmop
- Nawng-pa-keng
- Nawngpeng
- Nawngsāng
- Nawngtao
- Nawngteng
- Nawngwawn
- Nawng-ya
- Nā-ya
- Pa-hka
- Pa-hki
- Pānghio
- Pānghku
- Pānghpakhi
- Pang-law
- Pāng-leng
- Pāngnim
- Pang-oi
- Pang-wet
- Pa-tap
- Peng-yu
- Ping-hkan
- Pingkwe
- Pungsang
- Ta-hat
- Tak-let
- Ta-pe
- Tawngseng
- Wo-long
