= Battle of Ngasaunggyan =

1277 battle in China

- Part of Mongol invasion of Burma
Date	1277
Location	Ngasaunggyan (present-day Myazedi, Myanmar)
Result	Tactical Yuan victory, Strategic Draw

Belligerents
Pagan Empire	Yuan dynasty

Commanders and leaders
Narathihapate Yazathingyan	Khudu †

Strength
10,000+ plus more than 120 war elephants	6,000–12,000 cavalry

Casualties and losses
Heavy	Unknown

The Battle of Ngasaunggyan (Chinese: 牙嵩延之戰) was fought in 1277 between the Yuan dynasty of China and the Pagan Kingdom of Burma led by Narathihapate. The battle was initiated by Narathihapate, who invaded Yunnan, a province of the Yuan dynasty. Yuan defenders soundly defeated the Pagan forces.

== Prelude ==
Hostility between the two empires had already been established by that time. When Kublai Khan had sent emissaries to regional powers of eastern Asia to demand tribute, Narathihapate refused the Khan's representatives the first time they visited in 1271. A later tribute mission ended up with the Mongol envoys being killed by bandits in 1273. When Kublai Khan did not immediately respond to this insult, Narathihapate gained confidence that the Yuan would attack him.

== Battle ==
In 1277, Narathihapate subsequently invaded the state of Kaungai, whose chief had recently pledged fealty to Kublai Khan. Local garrisons of Yuan troops were ordered to defend the area, and although outnumbered were able to soundly defeat the Pagan forces in battle. There is no evidence of Narathihapate himself leading the battle as Burmese chronicles themselves consider him far too incompetent and cowardly and there is no clear mention of this battle in it. Even if he was present, it was likely to be commanded by Yazathingyan or another general.

The Burmese advanced with their war elephants which nearly caused the horse archer-based Yuan army to panic with their ponies became uncontrollable and nearly routed. However the Yuan general Khudu (Qutuq) quickly restored order. He ordered his men to dismount and tether their horses in a nearby woods, and fight as foot archers instead. The showers of Mongol arrows were unable to directly harm the armoured elephants but the intensity of their volleys terrified the elephants which started to panic and ultimately turned and trampled their own troops. Seeing this the Yuan troops immediately remounted and charged down upon the broken Burmese lines before they could reform, first pouring arrows into their ranks and then closing into melee with sabers and maces. The remaining Burmese infantry fought fiercely and withstood several charges and the fighting lasted for sometime with the Yuan beginning to take heavy losses. However, the better armoured Yuan troops allowed them to engage the unarmoured Burmese levies more boldly who were beginning to be worn down by the constant cavalry charges. Soon, Khudu and his riders finally broke the few remaining disciplined Burmese troops and the entire host routed leaving the Yuan as the sole masters the field. The Mongols did not pursue them too far, however, as Khudu was wounded in battle and they took too many losses so returned to Yunnan to regroup.

== Aftermath ==
In the end of 1277, Yunnan governor's son Naser al-Din attacked Bhamo again and tried to establish a postal system. However, deadly heat forced him to leave Burma. He returned to Khanbaliq with 12 elephants and gave them to Kublai Khan in 1279.

The Battle of Ngassaunggyan was the first of three decisive battles between the two empires, the others being the Battle of Bhamo in 1283 and the Battle of Pagan in 1287. By the end of these battles, the Yuan dynasty had forced the Burmese king to flee the capital and gain the submissions of the Pagan nobles and installed a puppet government.

The battle was later reported back to Europe by Marco Polo, who described the battle vividly in his reports. His description was presumably pieced together by accounts he heard while visiting Kunming.
