= Kawng Hsint =

Kawng Hsint ကောင်းစင့် Kaungsin
- Location in Burma
- Coordinates: 24°16′01″N 97°10′40″E
- Country: Burma
- State: Kachin State
- District: Bhamo District
- Township: Bhamo Township

Population (2005)
  - Religions: Buddhism
- Time zone: UTC+6.30 (UTC + 6:30)

Kawng Hsint is a village located in Bhamo Township, Bhamo District in the Kachin State of northeastern Burma.
