= Shwegu Township =

Coordinates: 24.2167°N 96.8000°E

Shwegu Township ရွှေကူမြို့နယ်
- Township
- Location in Bhamo district
- Country: Myanmar
- State: Kachin State
- District: Bhamo District
- Capital: Shwegu
- Time zone: UTC+6:30 (MST)

Shwegu Township (Burmese: ရွှေကူမြို့နယ်) is a township of Bhamo District in the Kachin State of Myanmar (Burma). The principal town is Shwegu.

== Towns and villages ==
- Amatgyigon
- Aung Yang
- Bogon
- Bumsi
- Buwa
- Chinlon
- Heinun
- Hgnettada
- Hkachang
- Hkachoyang
- Hkahkyeng
- Hkapra
- Hnokkyo
- Hpalapyang
- Htingrahtap
- Kaitu
- Kani
- Kanlaung
- Kathankawng
- Khachyang
- Khamawkawng
- Konnu
- Kyaukkyi
- Kyauktalon
- Kyundaw
- Lagatyan
- Lakum
- Lana
- Leiksin
- Linghkyi
- Loipaw
- Loiyang
- Lunghpa
- Maichyen
- Maihtingyang
- Man Aw
- Mankaw
- Man Kin
- Man Pu
- Man Wein
- Maru
- Mawgyan
- Mayingin
- Mege
- Mokin
- Mole
- Mosit
- Myaingtha
- Myaing Ywa
- Myogon
- Myohla
- Namlenkawng
- Namolai
- Nampu
- Nam-un
- Nankok
- Nantan
- Nataungyan
- Naungletgyi
- Naungmo
- Naungyin
- Ngabatgyi
- Nkrutkru
- Nyaunggon
- Panbonkawnan
- Panbonyang
- Pandin
- Pankhongyang
- Paukkon
- Pinmahkaw
- Shawbyu
- Shu-u-kawng
- Shwegu
- Shwegugale
- Simaw
- Simugale
- Sindat
- Sindatka
- Si-ngan
- Sinkan
- Sinpokgale
- Sinwekawng
- Sithaung
- Sonpu
- Tali
- Tashi Loipaw
- Taukte
- Tawbakawng
- Tawbon
- Tawian
- Thinbawin
- Tonpon
- Tugyaung
- Umung-gahtawng
- Wapyat
- Wetawngkawng
- Winwa
- Woretu
- Yele
- Zagatdaung
- Zinbon
