= UPA-Left Coordination Committee =

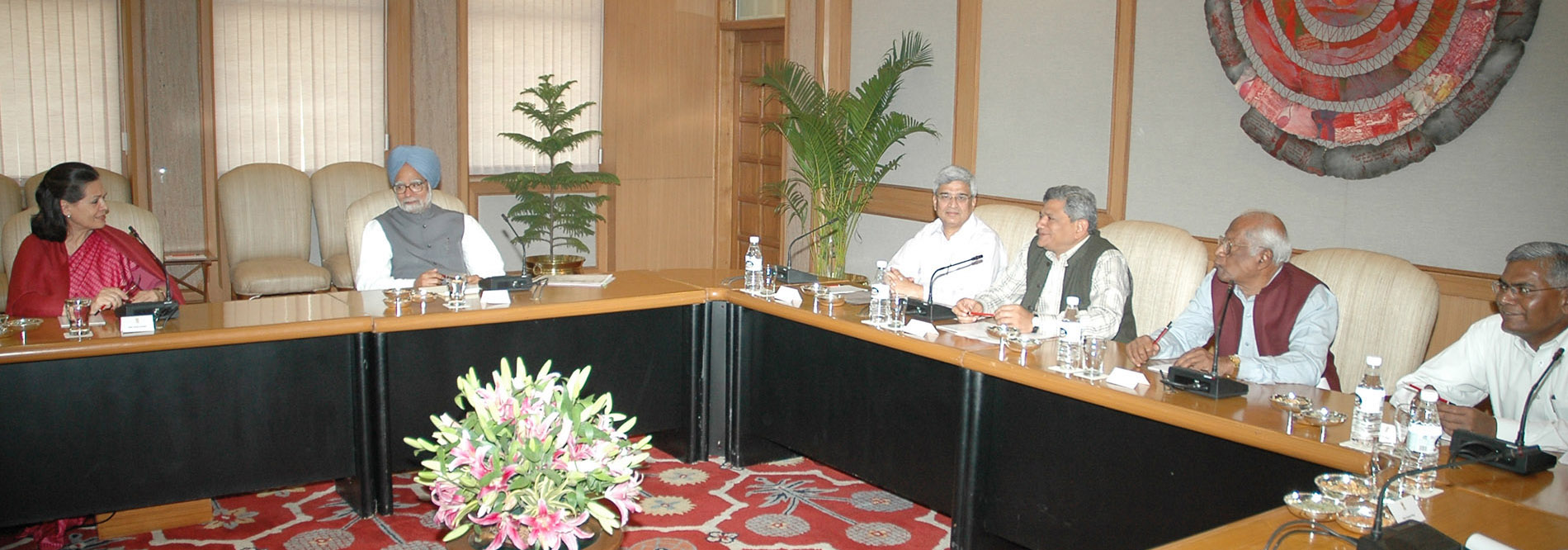
The 13 February 2006 meeting of the UPA-Left Coordination Committee. From the left: UPA Chairperson Sonia Gandhi, Prime Minister Manmohan Singh, CPI(M) leaders Prakash Karat and Sitaram Yechury, CPI leaders A.B. Bardhan and D. Raja.

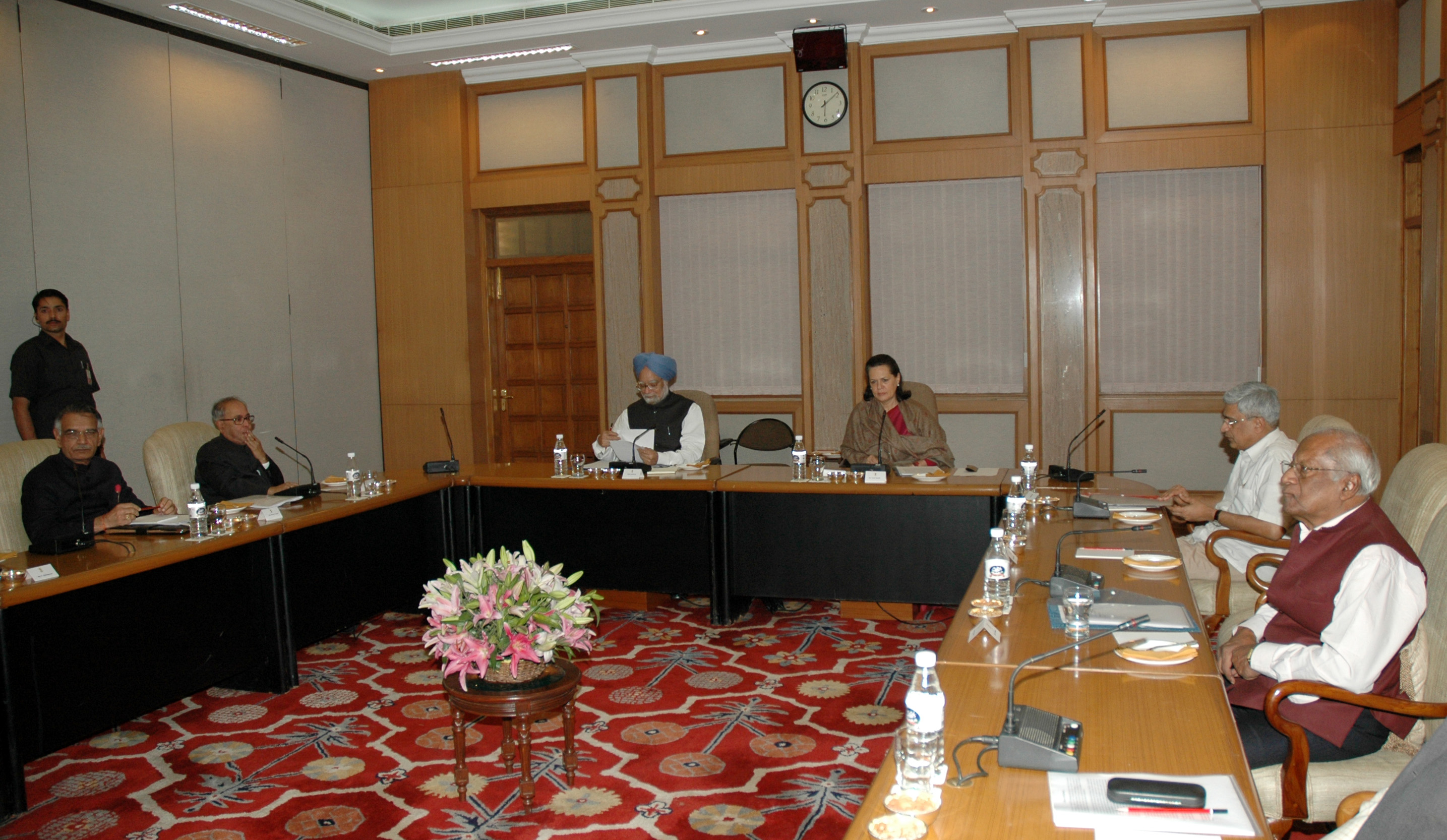
UPA-Left Coordination Committee meeting on 13 November 2006

The UPA-Left Coordination Committee was a platform dedicated to coordinate policy discussions between the Indian National Congress and the parliamentary left-wing parties during the UPA I cabinet governing India 2004–2009. During this period the parliamentary left parties were providing outside support to the government, without being part of the governing coalition as such.

The four left parties in the UPA-Left Coordination Committee were the Communist Party of India (Marxist) (CPI(M)), Communist Party of India (CPI), the Revolutionary Socialist Party (RSP) and the All India Forward Bloc (AIFB). The left parties were represented by six members in the committee, two each from CPI(M) (Prakash Karat and Sitaram Yechury) and CPI (A.B. Bardhan and D. Raja) and one each from RSP (Abani Roy) and AIFB (Debabrata Biswas). The UPA was represented by its chairperson Sonia Gandhi and Prime Minister Manmohan Singh, as well as by individual ministers who would be invited depending on the topics to be discussed. On the UPA side, no other party than the Indian National Congress was represented in the committee. During the Nationalist Congress Party convention of 2006, NCP leader and Minister of Agriculture Sharad Pawar appealed for inclusion of the different UPA constituents in the UPA-Left Coordination Committee. In the formation of the committee, there was an unwritten understanding that the Congress would let the communist parties vet any major policy proposals.

The first major friction between the government and the left occurred over the government plans to divest from Bharat Heavy Electricals Limited in 2005. In June 2005, the left parties began boycotting the UPA-Left Coordination Committee. In 14 October 2005 the left parties suspended their boycott, as they had received reassurances from Prime Minister Manmohan Singh and UPA Chairperson Sonia Gandhi that there would be no divestment from BHEL and other 'navaratna companies'.

The second major friction between the government and the left parties occurred ahead of the 6 March 2006 vote on Iran in the International Atomic Energy Agency. On 10 February 2006 the CPI(M) Politburo hinted that their support to the UPA government would be in peril unless their demands on the IAEA vote were headed. As tensions on the issue simmered, the left parties came to a common understanding with the opposition Samajwadi Party. Notably, in the same period, the Samajwadi Party and the Telugu Desam Party had announced that they were presenting a no-confidence vote against the UPA government on the coming budget session. The UPA-Left Coordination Committee met on 13 February 2006.

The seventh meeting of the UPA-Left Coordination Committee was held on 17 March 2006. Following the meeting Prakash Karat requested further safeguards to India before supporting the Indo-US nuclear deal.

The eight meeting of the UPA-Left Coordination Committee was held in May 2006.

Later phase of the UPA I government tenure, the UPA-Left Coordination Committee rarely met. On 2 June 2008 the RSP Central Committee decided to pull out of the committee, arguing that unilateral actions of UPA had rendered the committee meaningless and that the policies of the UPA government were paving the path for growing BJP influence. In response to the move of RSP to leave the committee, CPI(M) leader Biman Bose declared that the committee had become 'ineffective and defunct'.
