= Mahat, Eastern Rukum =

Mahat महत
- Village development committee
- Location in Nepal
- Coordinates: 28.53°N 82.65°E
- Country: Nepal
- Province: Lumbini Province
- District: Eastern Rukum District

Population (2011)
  - Total: 4,621
- Time zone: UTC+5:45 (Nepal Time)
- Area code: +977-88
- Website: www.ddcrukum.gov.np

Mahat is a village development committee in Eastern Rukum District in Lumbini Province of western Nepal. At the 2011 Nepal census, it had a population of 4621 people living in 937 individual households.
