= Nawngwawn =

Former Shan State in Burma

Coordinates: 20°31′52″N 97°12′39″E

Nawngwawn was a Shan state in what is today Burma.
