= Madangguk =

Korean theatre form associated with the Minjung Movement

Madangguk or Madanggeuk (Korean: 마당극; lit. people's theatre) is a theatrical art form that sprung up in South Korea in light of the Minjung Movement. The word "madang" (마당) means "yard" whilst "guk" (극) means "theatre". Thus, literally, it means yard theatre, which implies that this form of theatre was more personal or communal than formal or commercial. Madangguk was inspired by traditional Korean art forms such as talchum (탈춤) or masked dance. Madangguk was popularized in the 1970s-1980s by South Korean university students during a time of political oppression. It was an attempt to create a counter dialogue against the government’s attempt to preserving certain art forms to create a strategic remembrance of Korean history. Madangguk became a popular dramatic art form used to express political and societal issues of post colonial South Korea and played a significant role in the Minjung Movement.

== History and influences ==
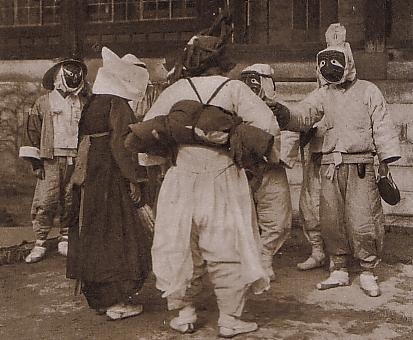
An example of Korean masked dance

Madangguk arose in the 1970s and was inspired by older Korean traditional art forms such as talchum (masked dance). Like its name suggests, talchum involved masked dancers, who normally performed a narrative dance. These masks were used not only to express emotions of the characters, but also to provide anonymity for the dancers who often expressed critique towards the elite and religious figures through their performances. Thus, Madangguk was also a political narrative expression through acting, dancing, and props to tell stories about the lower or middle class struggles and political or economic oppression. Madangguk became popular in the 1970s throughout South Korea as university students began to perform throughout the country to express their frustrations at the government. Korea during this time faced frequent government unrest and political oppression from the militant political leaders. In the 1960s, the government began an initiative to memorialize Korean history, and Madangguk was a way of countering this by the people who wanted to have a say in what was remembered of Korean history and art. Thus, Madangguk performances often revolve around themes of injustice, violence, poverty, and pursuit of liberty.

== Elements of Madangguk ==
Traditionally, Madangguk, just like its name (yard theatre) has a loose structure and was performed in informal (non-stage) places such as yards, courtyards, or open fields. The audience would sit in a circle and the performers would perform in the center. Because of this, there were no theatre sets or stages that one may expect when watching a modern western play. This element may be what attracted university students to it at the time, because it was an inexpensive yet effective medium of expression. Even when performed indoors, no special sets were created except for perhaps some lighting. This also encouraged audience participation since there were no boundaries between the performers and the audience; they were all in the same space. All of these elements of Madangguk made it easy to partake in, highly portable, and effective in spreading an idea or story. Contemporary Madangguk performances now use more props and costumes, although the minimal stage production remains the same.

When it comes to storyline, unlike modern theatre, the narratives in a Madangguk performance are often based upon real stories. Rather than creating a fictional experience or voyeuristic journey into a different realm, Madangguk performances focus on real life issues faced by lower class South Korean citizens. This is another reason the art form was so popular, because the audience themselves felt that they were somehow the subjects of the stories being told through the performances.

== Madangguk in the Minjung Movement ==
From 1960s to 1980s, South Korea went through several government upheavals and suffered various government oppression, corrupt leaders, exploitation of wealth, and other hardships. The Minjung movement was an attempt to attain a democratized society that was for the people, not the elite. And because Madangguks illustrated such hardships as well as potential ways to fight hardship, many scholars believe that Madangguk played a significant role in the Minjung movement in South Korea. In fact, because Madangguk involved political themes and criticism, it served not only as a way of communicating propaganda, but getting the audience invested in the cause by engaging them emotionally. Madangguk in the 1970s-80s was a way of analyzing the socio-political state of South Korea under the militant government in a way that uneducated and educated alike could understand. Due to Madangguk's portability and ability to engage the audience easily, it spread very quickly with most universities having their own Madangguk groups during this time. Madangguk's exploration of oppression and rebellion can be seen as a rehearsal for the revolution that the Minjung movement sought after as it gave people a vision of what could happen when they fought back. Because of this, Madangguk performances were often present at political events or protests. At times, the production itself would cause an unplanned riot or rebellion as a result of the show. Thus, many scholars believe that Madangguk was the beginning of the Minjung movement, creating a solidarity amongst Koreans through their shared hardships and moving the audience to action.

== Notable works ==
TITLE	BY	THEMES
Sorigut Agu	Kim Chi Ha	materialism, anti transnational capitalism
The Hawk of Changsangot	Hwang Sog Yong	government corruption, peasant rebellion
Unification Rice		North-South Korea unification, hunger
The Divination		America and decolonization, violence, gwangju massacre
