= Tangyan, Myanmar =

Town in Shan State, Myanmar

Coordinates: 22°29′N 98°24′E

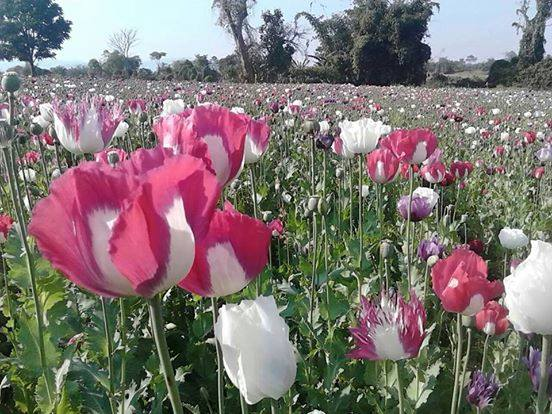
Opium poppy field

Tangyan (also Lan-ts'ang-hsien or Tangyang) (Burmese: တန့်ယန်းမြို့) is capital of Tangyan District and the principal city of Tangyan Township in Shan State, Myanmar. It is situated in a valley in a mountainous region. It lies at an elevation of 946 m.

Starting on 10 July 2024, the United Wa State Army entered Tangyan after negotiations with the State Administration Council to prevent Operation 1027 from reaching Tangyan.
