= Mansi Township =

Coordinates: 24.1167°N 97.3000°E

Mansi Township မန်စီမြို့နယ်
- Township
- Location in Bhamo district
- Country: Myanmar
- State: Kachin State
- District: Bhamo District
- Time zone: UTC+6:30 (MST)

Mansi Township (Burmese: မန်စီမြို့နယ်) is a township of Bhamo District in the Kachin State in northern Myanmar (Burma). The principal town is Mansi.

The forests of Mansi Township are affected by illegal logging.
