= Momauk Township =

Coordinates: 24.2500°N 97.3500°E

Momauk Township မိုးမောက်မြို့နယ်
- Township
- Location in Bhamo district
- Country: Myanmar
- State: Kachin State
- District: Bhamo District
- Time zone: UTC+6:30 (MST)

Momauk Township (Burmese: မိုးမောက်မြို့နယ်) is a township of Bhamo District in the Kachin State of Myanmar (Burma). The principal town is Momauk.
