= Bhamo District =

District of Kachin State, Myanmar

Coordinates: 24°15′N 97°15′E

Bhamo District (Burmese: ဗန်းမော်ခရိုင်) is a district of the Kachin State in northern Myanmar (Burma). The capital is the city of Bhamo. The district covers an area of 10,742.9 km^{2}. In 2002, the estimated population of Bhamo District was 363,300. The district consists of four townships:

Location in Kachin State

- Bhamo Township
- Mansi Township
- Momauk Township
- Shwegu Township

Bhamo District is bordered by:

- Dehong Dai and Jingpo Autonomous Prefecture of China to the east,
- Kyaukme District of Shan State to the south and southwest,
- Katha District of Sagaing Division to the west,
- Mohnyin District to the northwest, and
- Myitkyina District to the north and northeast.
