= Man Maw =

Man Maw may refer to several places in Burma (Myanmar):

- Man Maw State - a former Shan principality in Burma (also called Wanmaw or Bhamo)
- Man Maw, Bhamo Township, Kachin State
- Man Maw, Satkaya village tract, Homalin Township, Sagaing Region
- Man Maw, Maungkan village tract, Homalin Township, Sagaing Region
- Man Maw, Paungbyin Township, Sagaing Region
