= Namttaw =

River village in Northwestern Myanmar

Namttaw, is a river village located in Homalin Township, Hkamti District in the Sagaing Division of Northwestern Burma (Myanmar). It is situated near Maingkaing, Gyobin and Thetkedawng.
