= Hue Laung =

- Village
- Location in Myanmar
- Coordinates: 25°10′N 95°5′E
- Country: Myanmar
- Region: Sagaing Region
- District: Hkamti District
- Township: Homalin Township
- Village Tract: Naungyin
- Time zone: UTC+6.30 (MMT)

Hue Laung (Burmese: ဟူးလောင်) is a village on the Chindwin River in Homalin Township, Hkamti District, in the Sagaing Region of northwestern Burma. It is part of the Naung Yin village tract.
