= Naungpinlay =

- Village
- Location in Myanmar
- Coordinates: 25°15′N 95°6′E
- Country: Myanmar
- Region: Sagaing Region
- District: Hkamti District
- Township: Homalin Township
- Village tract: Naungpin
- Time zone: UTC+6.30 (MMT)

Naungpinlay (Burmese: နောင်ပင်လေး) is a village in northern Homalin Township, Hkamti District, in the Sagaing Region of northwestern Burma. It is located south of Manpa. It is part of the Naungpin village tract.
