= Tabaw =

- Village
- Location in Burma
- Coordinates: 24°36′16″N 94°41′20″E
- Country: Burma
- Region: Sagaing Region
- District: Hkamti District
- Township: Homalin Township
- Time zone: UTC+6.30 (MST)

Tabaw is a small village in Homalin Township, Hkamti District, in the Sagaing Region of northwestern Burma. Tabaw lies on the Chindwin River, to the north of Natset.
