= Sezin =

- Village
- Location in Myanmar
- Coordinates: 25°20′00″N 95°58′00″E
- Country: Myanmar
- Region: Sagaing Region
- District: Hkamti District
- Township: Homalin Township
- Time zone: UTC+6.30 (MMT)

Sezin (Burmese: ဆယ်ဇင်း) is a village in northern Sagaing Region, Myanmar along the boader of Kachin. It is located around 40 miles from Hpakant's administrative centre. The village is known for being a gold mining hub.

== History ==
On August 9, 2022, the Tatmadaw and the Shanni Nationalities Army (SNA) laid siege to Sezin, which had been captured by the Kachin Independence Army (KIA). The KIA were forced to retreat after intense clashes with regime forces. Military troops reportedly set fire to around 700 houses in the community and shot civilians attempting to escape.

In April 2024, KIA troops recaptured Sezin from the Tatmadaw.
