= Hulaung =

- Village
- Location in Myanmar
- Coordinates: 24°49′N 94°53′E
- Country: Myanmar
- Region: Sagaing Region
- District: Hkamti District
- Township: Homalin Township
- Village Tract: Tonmate
- Time zone: UTC+6.30 (MMT)

Hulaung (Burmese: ဟူလောင်) is an agricultural village near the village of Tonmate in Homalin Township, Hkamti District, in the Sagaing Region of northwestern Myanmar. It is part of the Tonmate village tract.
