= Thayagon, Bogon =

Tharyagon သာယာကုန်း
- Village
- Location in Myanmar
- Coordinates: 24°48′37″N 95°24′46″E
- Country: Myanmar
- Region: Sagaing Region
- District: Hkamti District
- Township: Homalin Township
- Village Tract: Bogon, Homalin
- Time zone: UTC+6.30 (MMT)

Thayagon (Burmese: သာယာကုန်း) is a village in eastern Homalin Township, Hkamti District, in the Sagaing Region of northwestern Myanmar. It is located on the south bank of a tributary of the Uyu River about 31 miles (50 km) east of Homalin, 12 miles (19 km) west of the border with Banmauk Township. It is part of the Bogon village tract.
