= Taikat =

- Village
- Location in Burma
- Coordinates: 24°36′N 95°8′E
- Country: Burma
- Region: Sagaing Region
- District: Hkamti District
- Township: Homalin Township
- Time zone: UTC+6.30 (MST)

Taikat is a river village in Homalin Township, Hkamti District, in the Sagaing Region of northwestern Myanmar. Taikat lies to the northwest of Nawnghkun. The village is located in ethnic Shan territory.
