= Htwetwa =

Htwetwa is the name of several villages in Burma:

- Htwetwa, Htwetwa village tract, Homalin Township, Sagaing Region
- Htewtwa, Khataungpwint village tract, Homalin Township, Sagaing Region
