= Yebawmi =

- Village
- Location in Burma
- Coordinates: 25°15′N 95°45′E
- Country: Burma
- Region: Sagaing Region
- District: Hkamti District
- Township: Homalin Township
- Time zone: UTC+6.30 (MST)

Yebawmi is a river village in Homalin Township, Hkamti District, in the Sagaing Region of northwestern Burma. It is located near Hwepanan. Yebawmi lies on the banks of the Uyu River and is noted for its salt springs and waistcloth weaving.
