= Na-ta-kyaik =

- Village
- Location in Burma
- Coordinates: 24°51′N 94°49′E
- Country: Burma
- Region: Sagaing Region
- District: Hkamti District
- Township: Homalin Township
- Time zone: UTC+6.30 (MST)

Na-ta-kyaik is a river village in Homalin Township, Hkamti District, in the Sagaing Region of northwestern Burma. It is located southwest of Homalin.
