= Tonehein Khondan =

- Village
- Location in Myanmar
- Coordinates: 24°48′N 95°2′E
- Country: Myanmar
- Region: Sagaing Region
- District: Hkamti District
- Township: Homalin Township
- Village Tract: Satkaya
- Time zone: UTC+6.30 (MMT)

Tonehein Khondan (Burmese: တုံးဟိန်/ခုံတမ်း) is a village in Homalin Township, Hkamti District, in the Sagaing Region of northwestern Myanmar. It is part of the Satkaya village tract.
