= Khaungkhan =

- Village
- Location in Myanmar
- Coordinates: 24°55′N 94°54′E
- Country: Myanmar
- Region: Sagaing Region
- District: Hkamti District
- Township: Homalin Township
- Village Tract: Khaungkhan
- Time zone: UTC+6.30 (MMT)

Khaungkhan (Burmese: ခေါင်ခန်း) is a village on the Chindwin River in Homalin Township, Hkamti District, in the Sagaing Region of northwestern Myanmar. It is located next to Homalin Airport. It is part of the Khaungkhan village tract.
