= Padaung =

Padaung may refer to:

- A tribe of Burma's Kayan ethnic group, known for wearing copper neck rings.
- Padaung language, spoken by the Kayan people of Burma
- Padaung (village)
- Padung (earring) a type of earring worn by the Karo people of northern Sumatras
- Pandaung and Pandaung Township in Bago Region- both officially romanised as Padaung
