= Hunaung =

- Village
- Location in Myanmar
- Coordinates: 24°56′N 94°54′E
- Country: Myanmar
- Region: Sagaing Region
- District: Hkamti District
- Township: Homalin Township
- Village Tract: Hin Naung
- Time zone: UTC+6.30 (MMT)

Hunaung (Burmese: ဟူနောင်) is a village in Homalin Township, Hkamti District, in the Sagaing Region of northwestern Myanmar. It lies on the Chindwin River on the other side of the river from Homalin Airport. It is part of the Hin Naung village tract.
