= Mansein =

Mansein may refer to several places in Myanmar:

- Mansein, Homalin Township, Sagaing Region
- Mansein, Pinlebu Township, Sagaing Region
