= Kawya =

Kawya mankoungyaunt
- Village
- Location in Burma
- Coordinates: 25°0′N 95°0′E
- Country: Burma
- Region: Sagaing Region
- District: Hkamti
- Township: Homalin Township
- Time zone: UTC+6.30 (MST)

Kawya is a village on the Chindwin River in Homalin Township, Hkamti District, in the Sagaing Region of northwestern Burma. It is located north of the town of Homalin and south of Maungkan, about halfway. Gardens were planted in Kawya and other nearby villages around 1700 and the village has been documented as producing pickled tea, known as "letpet".
