= Htwetwa, Homalin =

Htwetwa ထွက်ဝ
- Village
- Location in Myanmar
- Coordinates: 25°21′N 95°17′E
- Country: Myanmar
- Region: Sagaing Region
- District: Hkamti District
- Township: Homalin Township
- Village tract: Htwetwa
- Time zone: UTC+6.30 (MMT)

Htwetwa is a village in northern Homalin Township, Hkamti District, in the Sagaing Region of northwestern Burma. It lies on the confluence of the Tizu River and the Chindwin River, opposite from the village Ywathit about 1.2 miles (1.9 km) north of Tamanthi. It is part of its own Htwetwa village tract.
