= Nammun =

Village in Sagaing Region, Myanmar

- Village
- Location in Burma
- Coordinates: 24°56′N 95°27′E
- Country: Burma
- Region: Sagaing Region
- District: Hkamti District
- Township: Homalin Township
- Time zone: UTC+6.30 (MST)

Nammun is a small town in Mohnyin Township, Kachin State which is in the northern part of Myanmar. It is situated near Indawgyi Lake, the biggest freshwater lake in Southeast Asia. Its number of houses is about 2000 and it has a population of over 15,000 people. Major ethnic groups living there are Shan (50%), Kachin(40%) and Burma (10%). Most are Buddhists and Kachin people are Christians. 70% of the people are farmers. The highest temperature in summer is 42 degree Celsius, and the lowest temperature in winter is 9 degrees Celsius Burma.
