= Maingwe =

- Village
- Location in Burma
- Coordinates: 25°15′N 95°9′E
- Country: Burma
- Region: Sagaing Region
- District: Hkamti
- Township: Homalin Township
- Time zone: UTC+6.30 (MST)

Maingwe is a village on the Chindwin River in Homalin Township, Hkamti District, in the Sagaing Region of northwestern Burma. It is located north of Tonmalaw. Gardens were planted in Maingwe and other nearby villages around 1700 and the village has been documented as producing pickled tea, known as "letpet".
