= Namaw =

Namaw ꩫႃးမႂ်
- Village
- Location in Myanmar
- Coordinates: 24.8016°N 95.0999°E
- Country: Myanmar
- Region: Sagaing Region
- District: Homalin District
- Township: Homalin Township
- Village Tract: Man Hon
- Time zone: UTC+6.30 (MMT)

Namaw, officially Nar Maw (Burmese: နားမော်ရွာ) or Narr Mao (Tai Laing: မၢꩫ်ႍꩫႃးမႂ်), is a village in Homalin Township, in the Sagaing Region of northwestern Burma. It is located in the Man Hon village tract. The village's place code is 176569.

During the current civil war in Myanmar, the village's Kin Pagoda Hill became a site of a skirmish between the Kachin Independence Army-backed People's Defence Force and the military junta-aligned Shanni Nationalities Army in late 2022. Later, in September 2025 the village's buildings were destroyed during renewed fighting between the two groups. The village was reportedly inhabited by Shanni people, before they fled the village during the war.
