= Naungpin =

Naungpin may refer to several places in Burma:

- Naungpin, Homalin Township, Sagaing Region
- Naungpinlay, Homalin Township, Sagaing Region
