= Pinpalu =

- Village
- Location in Burma
- Coordinates: 25°1′N 95°0′E
- Country: Burma
- Region: Sagaing Region
- District: Hkamti District
- Township: Homalin Township
- Time zone: UTC+6.30 (MST)

Pinpalu is a village in Homalin Township, Hkamti District, in the Sagaing Region of northwestern Burma. It lies on the Chindwin River, north of Kawya.

== Geography ==
The village of Pinpalu is situated on the western bank of the Chindwin River, north of the village of Kawya, and forms part of the rural areas of the Sagaing Region, which is known for its mountainous terrain and numerous rivers.
