= Thayagon =

Thayagon may refer to several villages in Myanmar

- Thayagon, Pinhinkhar village tract, Banmauk Township, Sagaing Region
- Thayagon, Sikataung village tract, Banmauk Township, Sagaing Region
- Thayagon, Bogon village tract, Homalin Township, Sagaing Region
- Thayagon, Tamanthi village tract, Homalin Township, Sagaing Region
- Thayagon, Kale Township, Sagaing Region
