= Mansein, Homalin =

Mansein မန်စိမ်း
- Village
- Location in Myanmar
- Coordinates: 25°12′N 95°58′E
- Country: Myanmar
- Region: Sagaing Region
- District: Hkamti District
- Township: Homalin Township
- Village Tract: Mansein
- Time zone: UTC+6.30 (MMT)

Mansein (Burmese: မန်စိမ်း) is a village in northeastern Homalin Township, Hkamti District, in the Sagaing Region of northwestern Myanmar. It is located near the border with Kachin State on a tributary of the Uyu River about 21 miles (34 km) west of Indawgyi Lake. It is located in the Mansein village tract.
