= Man Maw, Satkaya =

Manmaw မန်မော်
- Village
- Location in Myanmar
- Coordinates: 24°48′N 95°1′E
- Country: Myanmar
- Region: Sagaing Region
- District: Hkamti District
- Township: Homalin Township
- Village Tract: Satkaya
- Time zone: UTC+6.30 (MMT)

Man Maw (Burmese: မန်မော်) is a village in Homalin Township, Hkamti District, in the Sagaing Region of northwestern Myanmar. It is located 8 miles (13 km) southeast of Homalin. It is located in the Satkaya village tract.
