= Man Maw, Maungkan =

Manmaw မန်မော်
- Village
- Location in Myanmar
- Coordinates: 25°4′N 95°4′E
- Country: Myanmar
- Region: Sagaing Region
- District: Hkamti District
- Township: Homalin Township
- Village Tract: Maungkan
- Time zone: UTC+6.30 (MMT)

Manmaw (Burmese: မန်မော်) is a village in northwestern Homalin Township, Hkamti District, in the Sagaing Region of northwestern Myanmar and it is located on a tributary of Chindwin River, 2 miles (3.2 km) southeast of Maungkan and the east bank of the Chindwin river. It is located in the Maungkan village tract.
