= Myaingtha =

Myaingtha may refer to several places in Burma:

- Myaingtha, Homalin, Sagaing Region
- Myaingtha, Shwegu, Kachin State
