= Padaung (village) =

- Village
- Location in Burma
- Coordinates: 25°6′N 95°3′E
- Country: Burma
- Region: Sagaing Region
- District: Hkamti District
- Township: Homalin Township
- Time zone: UTC+6.30 (MST)

Padaung is a river village in Homalin Township in Hkamti District in the Sagaing Region of northwestern Myanmar. It is located on the bank of the Chindwin River next to Maungkan.
