= Mongkun =

- Village
- Location in Burma
- Coordinates: 24°44′N 95°2′E
- Country: Burma
- Region: Sagaing Region
- District: Hkamti District
- Township: Homalin Township
- Time zone: UTC+6.30 (MST)

Mongkun is a village in Homalin Township, Hkamti District, in the Sagaing Region of northwestern Burma. It is located 1.7 kilometres west of Tawngbohla, and has an average elevation of 138 metres.
