= Nawnglun =

Nawnglun is the name of several villages in Myanmar:

- Nawnglun, Hkamti
- Nawnglun, Hsi Hseng, Hsi Hseng Township
