= Awthaw =

- Village
- Location in Burma
- Coordinates: 24°46′N 95°2′E
- Country: Myanmar
- Region: Sagaing Region
- District: Hkamti District
- Township: Homalin Township
- Time zone: UTC+6.30 (MMT)

Awthaw is a village in Homalin Township, Hkamti District, in the Sagaing Region of northwestern Myanmar. The village is about 4 miles south of the village of Naungpho Aung on the Uyu River.
