= Malon =

Malon may refer to:

== Arts and entertainment ==
- Malón (band), an Argentinian thrash metal band
- Malon (Star Trek), a fictional alien race
- Malon, a character in The Legend of Zelda

== People ==
- Benoît Malon (1841–1893), French socialist political leader
- František Maloň (1913–?), Czech rower
- Iván Malón (born 1986), Spanish footballer
- Marc Malon, American politician

== Places ==
- Malon, Burkina Faso
- Malon, Homalin, Burma
- Malon, Zaragoza, Spain

== Other uses ==
- Malón, plunder raids carried out by Mapuche warriors
- Perumal (deity), also known as Malon, a form of the Hindu deity Vishnu

== See also ==
- Malol language
