= Wetka, Myanmar =

Wetka
- Village
- Location in Burma
- Coordinates: 24°25′N 94°40′E
- Country: Burma
- Region: Sagaing Region
- District: Hkamti District
- Township: Homalin Township
- Time zone: UTC+6.30 (MST)

See also "Wetka".

Wetka is a village in Homalin Township, Hkamti District, in the Sagaing Region of northwestern Burma. It is located northwest of Chaunggan, near the Chindwin River.
