= Myene =

Myene may refer to:

- Myene people
- Myene language, spoken in Gabon
- Myene, Myanmar
