= Masein (disambiguation) =

Masein may refer to:

- Masein, Switzerland
- Masein, Homalin, Burma
- Masein, Kalewa, Burma
