= Nansabi =

- Village
- Location in Burma
- Coordinates: 25°21′N 95°21′E
- Country: Burma
- Region: Sagaing
- District: Hkamti
- Township: Homalin
- Time zone: UTC+6.30 (MST)

Nansabi is a village in Homalin Township, Hkamti District, in the Sagaing Region of northwestern Burma.
