= Nawnghkam =

Nawnghkam may refer to the following places in Myanmar:

- Nawnghkam, Hkamti
- Nawnghkam, Hsi Hseng, Hsi Hseng Township
