= Khonthar =

- Village
- Location in Myanmar
- Coordinates: 24.75963°N 95.13058°E
- Country: Myanmar
- Region: Sagaing Region
- District: Hkamti District
- Township: Homalin Township
- Village Tract: Manhon
- Time zone: UTC+6.30 (MMT)

Khonthar (Burmese: ခုန်သာ) is a village in Homalin Township, Hkamti District, in the Sagaing Region of northwestern Myanmar. It is part of the Manhon village tract.
