= Thayagon, Tamanthi =

Tharyagon သာယာကုန်း
- Village
- Location in Myanmar
- Coordinates: 25°18′N 95°15′E
- Country: Myanmar
- Region: Sagaing Region
- District: Hkamti District
- Township: Homalin Township
- Village Tract: Tamanthi
- Time zone: UTC+6.30 (MMT)

Thayagon (Burmese: သာယာကုန်း) is a village in northern Homalin Township, Hkamti District, in the Sagaing Region of northwestern Myanmar. It is located on the west bank of the upper Chindwin River about 5 miles (8.0 km) from the Leshi Township border near the major village of Tamanthi It is part of the Tamanthi village tract.
