= Malin, Homalin =

Malin
- Village
- Location in Burma
- Coordinates: 25°29′N 95°23′E
- Country: Burma
- Region: Sagaing Region
- District: Hkamti
- Township: Homalin Township
- Time zone: UTC+6.30 (MST)

Malin is a village on the Chindwin River in Homalin Township, Hkamti District, in the Sagaing Region of northwestern Burma. Gardens were planted in Malin and other nearby villages around 1700 and the village has been documented as producing pickled tea, known as "letpet".
