= Paukka =

Paukka may refer to several places in Burma:

- Paukka, Myinmu, Sagaing Region
- Paukka, Homalin, Sagaing Region
