= Nawngpu-awng =

Human settlement in Myanmar

Nawngpu-awng နောင်ပိုအောင်
- Village
- Location within Myanmar
- Coordinates: 24°48′33″N 95°04′17″E
- Country: Myanmar
- Region: Sagaing Region
- District: Hkamti District
- Township: Homalin Township
- Village tract: Nawngpu-awng
- Time zone: UTC+6.30 (MMT)

Naung Po Aung is a village in Homalin Township, Hkamti District, in the Sagaing Region of northwestern Burma.
