= Nammaw =

Nammaw may refer to several places in Burma:

- Nammaw, Homalin
- Nammaw, Kalewa
