= Khondangyi =

Kondangyi
- Village
- Location in Myanmar
- Coordinates: 24°43′N 95°10′E
- Country: Myanmar
- Region: Sagaing Region
- District: Hkamti District
- Township: Homalin Township
- Village Tract: Khondangyi
- Time zone: UTC+6.30 (MMT)

Khondangyi (Burmese: ခုန်တမ်းကြီး) is a village in Homalin Township, Hkamti District, in the Sagaing Region of northwestern Myanmar. It is part of the Khondangyi village tract.
