= Manthe =

- Village
- Location in Burma
- Coordinates: 25°19′N 95°18′E
- Country: Burma
- Region: Sagaing Region
- District: Hkamti District
- Township: Homalin Township

Government
- Time zone: UTC+6.30 (MST)

Manthe is a village on the Chindwin River in Homalin Township, Hkamti District, in the Sagaing Region of northwestern Burma.
