= Mezali (disambiguation) =

Mezali is a village in the Sagaing Region, Myanmar.

Mezali may also refer to:

== Places ==
- Mezali, Kayin State, a village in Kayin State, Myanmar

== People ==
- Fodil Mezali, an Algerian journalist and writer
- Hocine Mezali, an Algerian journalist and writer
