= Tatkon =

Tatkon may refer to many places in Burma:

- Tatkon, Naypyidaw Union Territory in Tatkon Township, Naypyidaw Union Territory.
- Tatkon, Homalin, Sagaing Myanmar
- Tatkon, Kawlin, Sagaing Myanmar
- Tatkon, Myothit, Magwe Myanmar
- Tatkon, Sinbaungwe (Tantabin), Magwe Myanmar
- Tatkon, Mawlaik, Sagaing Burma
- Tatkon, Padaung, Bago (Pegu) Myanmar
- Tatkon, Salin, Magwe Myanmar
- Tatkon, Ye-U, Sagaing Myanmar
- Tatkon, Pinlaung, Shan Myanmar
- Tatkon, Kyaukki, Bago (Pegu) Myanmar
- Tatkon, Ye-Ngan, Shan Myanmar
- Tatkon, Magwe, Magwe Myanmar
- Tatkon, Ingapu, Irrawaddy Myanmar
