= Nyaungbintha =

Nyaungbintha may refer to the following places in Burma:

- Nyaungbintha, Hsi Hseng
- Nyaungbintha, Homalin
- Nyaungbintha, Amarapura
- Nyaungbintha, Mogok
- Nyaungbintha, Ingapu
- Nyaungbintha, Sagaing
