= Htewtwa, Khataungpwint =

Htwetwa ထွက်ဝ
- Village
- Location in Myanmar
- Coordinates: 24°49′7″N 94°49′18″E
- Country: Myanmar
- Region: Sagaing Region
- District: Hkamti District
- Township: Homalin Township
- Village Tract: Khataungpwint
- Time zone: UTC+6.30 (MMT)

Htwetwa (Burmese: ထွက်ဝ) is a village in western Homalin Township, Hkamti District, in the Sagaing Region of northwestern Myanmar, about 7 miles (11 km) southwest of Homalin in the Chindwin River basin. It is part of the Khataungpwint village tract.
