= Sankat =

- Village
- Location in Myanmar
- Coordinates: 24°57′N 95°0′E
- Country: Myanmar
- Region: Sagaing Region
- District: Hkamti District
- Township: Homalin Township
- Time zone: UTC+6.30 (MST)

Sankat is a village in Homalin Township, Hkamti District, in the Sagaing Region of northwestern Myanmar.
