= Natset =

- Village
- Location in Burma
- Coordinates: 24°31′N 94°44′E
- Country: Burma
- Region: Sagaing Region
- District: Mawlaik District
- Township: Paungbyin Township
- Time zone: UTC+6.30 (MST)

Natset is a major village on the Chindwin River in Paungbyin Township, Mawlaik District, in the Sagaing Region of northwestern Burma. It is located on the border of Homalin Township, southwest of Myene.
