= Natnan =

Natnan may refer to several places in Burma:

- Natnan, Homalin
- Natnan, Kale
