= Ywathit, Homalin =

Ywathit
- Village
- Location in Burma
- Coordinates: 24°41′N 95°11′E
- Country: Burma
- Region: Sagaing Region
- District: Hkamti District
- Township: Homalin Township
- Time zone: UTC+6.30 (MST)

Ywathit is a village in Homalin Township, Hkamti District, in the Sagaing Region of northwestern Burma.
