= Gyobin =

- Town
- Location in Burma
- Coordinates: 24°50′N 95°18′E
- Country: Burma
- Region: Sagaing Region
- District: Hkamti District
- Township: Homalin Township
- Time zone: UTC+6.30 (MST)

Gyobin is a river town in Homalin Township, Hkamti District, in the Sagaing Region of northwestern Burma. It is located east of Kaukngo. An old frontier outpost was located at Gyobin during the British Burma period.
