= Nammaw, Homalin =

Village in Sagaing Region, Myanmar

NarMai(မၢၼ်ႈၼႃးမႂ်ႇ)
- Village
- Location in Burma
- Coordinates: 24°48′N 95°6′E
- Country: Burma
- Region: Sagaing Region
- District: Hkamti District
- Township: Homalin Township
- Time zone: UTC+6.30 (MST)

NarMai(မၢၼ်ႈၼႃးမႂ်ႇ) is a village in Homalin Township, Hkamti District, in the Sagaing Region of northwestern Burma. There are ShanNi (Tai Leng)people live in this village. The meaning of NarMai is Nar - Farms, Mai - New, that mean where the place of making and doing new farms.
