= Shanni Nationalities Army =

Ethnic Armed Organization in Myanmar

- ရှမ်းနီ အမျိုးသားများ တပ်မတော်
- Emblem of the Shanni Nationalities Army
- Leaders: Sao Meim Liam; Sao Khun Aung
- Dates active: January 2016 – present
- Active regions: Kachin State, Sagaing Region
- Ideology: Shanni (Red Shan) nationalism
- Size: 5,000+
- Wars: the internal conflict in Myanmar
- Website: Facebook page

The Shanni Nationalities Army (Burmese: ရှမ်းနီ အမျိုးသားများ တပ်မတော်; abbr. SNA) is a Shanni insurgent group active in northern Sagaing Region and Kachin State, Myanmar (Burma). Although it first was founded in 1989, it fully grew into an armed group in 2016. The SNA has five objectives – to gain statehood, to fight drugs, to establish a federal Union, to build unity among all Shan sub-groups, and to conserve ecological balance.

== Background ==
The Tai Lai or Shanni people, who number around 300,000 people total, are a related people to the Shan people. They live in western Kachin State and northern Sagaing Region.

The Shanni people suffered identity suppression with many in the SNA pointing to the history of losing their territory to the Kachin people following the Panglong Agreement. Some in the SNA claim the history of historic Shan states in the area from Mong Yang to Hkamti Long. The overlap between desires for a Shanni state and the existing Kachin state, as well as alleged oppression of Shanni by Kachin Independence Army, put the two armed groups in conflict with each other, while their demand for statehood also antagonized Tatmadaw.

== History ==
=== Formation to 2020 ===
According to the Shanni Nationalities Army (SNA), the group was formed in July 1989 and first established a headquarters in Nwe Impha on the India–Myanmar border in 2009.

The formation of the SNA was announced in January 2016 on the basis that by establishing an armed group, the Shanni people would be given a more prominent role in the country's political dialogue and would be able to protect their area. The SNA grew into relevance from the aftermath of the Nationwide Ceasefire Agreement and against the backdrop of increased violence between the Kachin Independence Army and the Shan State Army – South. SNA members took up arms as they felt only by having an armed group would their ethnic group be an important consideration in the peace process. The SNA and Shanni activists in 2016 wanted the National League for Democracy to allow them to sign the NCA. However, the government had a policy not to recognize new ethnic armed groups.

By 2019, they had bases in several parts of Kachin State and Sagaing Region. Tensions between the Myanmar Army and the SNA increased in mid-April 2020 with increased Myanmar Army militarization in Homalin Township eventually suppressing continued armed conflict. In July 2020, five KIA fighters killed two teenage Shanni boys after taking them captive. The KIA issued a formal apology and punished the fighters two weeks later after increased tension and pressure from the SNA.

=== 2021–present: Myanmar civil war ===
Even as the 2021 Myanmar coup d'état devolved into renewed ethnic conflict, many leaders within the SNA preferred to remain bystanders maintaining good connections with the Myanmar Army. Shanni communities had a history of collaboration with the Tatmadaw in their own areas to stand against the Kachin Independence Army (KIA). On 26 May 2021, the second-in-command of the SNA, Major General Sao Khun Kyaw was assassinated by the Myanmar Army.

However, by 2022, the SNA was actively allied with the junta as conflict between SNA and the KIA grew. In September that year, it accused the KIA, as well as PDF and the NUG of "accelerating the genocide plan against Shan Ni Nationals". A local speculated that increasing presence of KIA in areas contested by the SNA lead it to change its stance.

In August 2022, the SNA and the Myanmar Army set fire to hundreds of homes in Kachin state forcing KIA withdrawal from the area. In September, two SNA bases were attacked by the KIA and allied People's Defence Force groups using heavy artillery in Banmauk Township and Homalin Township.

In January 2023, several detainees from the Se Zin village police station controlled by the junta were handed over to the SNA. Approximately a hundred detainees were brought into the police station after weeks of fighting between the KIA against the Myanmar military and SNA in Hpakant township. The detainees were subject to torture and starvation and some died of sickness due to non-existent medical attention in their cells. On 19 January 2023, at least eight of the detainees were handed over to the SNA by the Myanmar military. SNA troops brought the detainees into the jungle blindfolded with hands-tied and murdered them by slitting their throats. Three of the detainees survived due to the SNA troops being heavily drunk. A witness stated that prisoners were being pulled out from the cells and murdered routinely.

According to PDF commanders and former SNA members who defected in 2026, ethnic Bamar personnel make up the majority of the ranks. Led by Shanni officers, non-Shanni personnel allegedly face movement restrictions and discrimination.
