= Htamanthi Wildlife Sanctuary =

Protected area in Myanmar

- IUCN category IV (habitat/species management area)
- Location within Myanmar
- Location: Hkamti District, Sagaing Region, Myanmar
- Coordinates: 25°21′50″N 95°33′36″E
- Area: 2,150.73 km^{2} (830.40 sq mi)
- Established: 1974
- Governing body: Forest Department

Htamanthi Wildlife Sanctuary is a 2,150.73 km^{2} (830.40 sq mi) large protected area in northern Myanmar. It was established in 1974 in the Sagaing Region.

It is located between the Chindwin River in Hkamti District and the Uyu River, with 596.7 km^{2} (230.40 mi^{2}) of the area in Homalin Township, and 1,600 km^{2} (600 mi^{2}) in Hkamti Township.

== Biodiversity ==
Htamanthi Wildlife Sanctuary provides habitat for over 30 mammals including Asian elephant (Elephas maximus), gaur (Bos gaurus), mainland serow (Capricornis milneedwardsii), Asiatic black bear (Ursus thibetanus) and Indochinese leopard (Panthera pardus delacouri). Formerly it was also home of the Northern Sumatran rhinoceros (Didermocherus sumatrensis lasiotis) and the Javan rhinoceros (Rhinoceros sondaicus), which have become extinct in the area in the 1980s, though some reports suggest that the former still persists in the park. Tiger (Panthera tigris), clouded leopard (Neofelis nebulosa), Asiatic golden cat (Catopuma temminckii), leopard cat (Prionailurus bengalensis), large Indian civet (Viverra zibetha), hog badger (Arctonyx collaris), Asian palm civet (Paradoxurus hermaphroditus), binturong (Arctictis binturong), masked palm civet (Paguma larvata) were recorded during a camera trap survey in 1999. The clouded leopard and marbled cat populations were studied more detailed between December 2014 and March 2016. An Asian water monitor (Varanus salvator) was recorded in 2016 along one of the streams flowing through the sanctuary.

Among the many birds found in the reserve are the white-winged duck (Asarcornis scutulata) and the masked finfoot (Heliopais personatus).
