= Shwe Pyi Aye, Sagaing =

Town in Sagaing Region, Myanmar

Shwe Pyi Aye ရွှေပြည်အေးမြို့
- Town
- Interactive map of Shwe Pyi Aye
- Coordinates: 24.687°N 94.731°E
- Country: Myanmar
- Region: Sagaing Region
- District: Homalin District
- Township: Homalin Township

Area =
  - Total: 3.96 sq mi (10.3 km^{2})

Population (2023)
  - Total: 4,012
  - Density: 1,010/sq mi (391/km^{2})
- Time zone: UTC+6:30 (MMT)

Shwe Pyi Aye (Burmese: ရွှေပြည်အေးမြို့) is a town in southern Homalin Township, in northwest Sagaing Region, Myanmar. It is the seat of the Kyangin Township in the Myanaung District. The town is located on the eastern bank of the Chindwin River and has 11 urban wards. The town was elevate to town status on 7 June 2010.

During the ongoing Myanmar civil war, People's Defence Forces (PDFs) briefly captured the town in January 2023 but were repelled a reinforcement of 200 junta troops who arrived in February 2023. The PDFs later retook the town on 22 November 2023. About 400 junta troops attempted to retake the town starting on 26 January 2024 but failed, abandoning their mission after 10 days of heavy losses.

The town was affected by the 2025 Myanmar earthquake with the National Unity Government of Myanmar deploying PDF forces to provide relief and security to the town, which had remained under resistance control.
