= Naungpin, Homalin =

Naungpin နောင်ပင်
- Village
- Location in Myanmar
- Coordinates: 25°13′46″N 95°6′57″E
- Country: Myanmar
- Region: Sagaing Region
- District: Hkamti District
- Township: Homalin Township
- Village tract: Naungpin
- Time zone: UTC+6.30 (MMT)

Naungpin (Burmese: နောင်ပင်) is a village in northern Homalin Township, Hkamti District, in the Sagaing Region of northwestern Burma. It is located south of Manpa. It is the principal village of the Naungpin village tract.
