= Tai Laing language =

Tai language of Burma

Tai Laing
- Tai Leng; Tai Nine; Shan-Ni
- တႆးလႅင်
- Native to: Myanmar
- Region: Kachin, Sagaing
- Native speakers: 100,000 (2010)
- Language family: Kra–Dai: Tai; Southwestern (Thai); Northwestern; Tai Laing
- Writing system: Burmese script (Tai Leng variant)

Language codes
- ISO 639-3: tjl
- Glottolog: tail1248

Tai Laing (Shan: တႆးလႅင်, lit. 'red Tai'; variously spelt Tai Leng or Tai Nine), also known as Shan-Ni (Burmese: ရှမ်းနီ, lit. 'red Shan'), is a Tai language of Burma, closely related to Khamti and Shan. It is written in its own variant of Burmese script, and though not taught in schools, is experiencing a cultural revival, albeit still small. There is no census of speakers, but they are estimated to number around 100,000.

Alternate names for Tai Laing are Shan-Bamar, Shan Kalay, Myaybyan Shan, Tai Nine, Tai Dine and Tai Chaung.

== Distribution and dialects ==
Tai Leng is spoken in Homalin Township, Sagaing Region, along the Chindwin, Irrawaddy, and Uru rivers. It is also spoken in Kachin State from Bhamo to Myitkyina townships.

There are two subgroups of Tai Leng, namely Tai Nine and Tai Leng. The Tai Nine live along the Chindwin river and Uru river. And the Tai Leng live along the railway line between Myitkyina and Mandalay and along the Ayeyarwady river from the upper of Mandalay.

== History ==
The Tai Leng settled in the Indawgyi Lake valley, in modern-day Kachin State, Myanmar, establishing city-states including Mongyang, Mogaung, Wuntho, Kale, Khamti, Tsaung Tsu and Momeik. Tai Leng has had long-term close contact with several Tibeto-Burman languages, including Burmese speakers to the south, Lolo-Burmese, Nungish, and Jingpho-Luish languages to the east and north and Naga languages to the west. These languages have influenced the phonology and grammar of Tai Leng, including the frequency of disyllabic words and presence of different grammatical markers, and variation in word order.

Following the 1962 Burmese coup d'état, restrictive language policies were promulgated by the military regime. The Kachin Independence Organization also repressed Tai Leng speakers, who lived in contested territory. In the 1990s, a military ceasefire enabled the Tai Leng to recover manuscripts, publish literacy books, and teach the language in summer schools. During the 2011–2015 Myanmar political reforms, Khin Pyone Yee was appointed Kachin State's Minister of Shan Affairs. She spearheaded a program to institutionalize Tai Leng education materials and curricula.

While Tai Leng is experiencing a linguistic revival driven by youth, many Tai Leng are now bilingual or monolingual in Burmese, due to assimilation and intermarriage with Burmese speakers.

== Writing system ==
Tai Laing is written using a modified version of the Mon-Burmese script. The alphabet and IAST equivalents are provided below. Letters in gold are used to transcribe Pali.

Letters
က k	ၵ kh	ꧩ g	ꧪ gh		င ṅ
ၸ c	ꩬ ch	ꧫ j	ꧬ jh		ꧧ ñ
ꩦ ṭ	ꩧ ṭh	ꧭ ḍ	ꧮ ḍh		ꧯ ṇ
တ t	ထ th	ꧻ d	ꧼ dh		ꩫ n
ပ p	ꧤ ph	ꧽ b	ꧾ bh	ꧨ f	မ m
ယ y	ꩺ r	လ l	ꧺ ḷ	ဝ w	ꧬ s
ၯ h	ဢ a				

Numerals
0 ꧰	1 ꧱	2 ꧲	3 ꧳	4 ꧴	5 ꧵	6 ꧶	7 ꧷	8 ꧸	9 ꧹
