= Tamanthi =

Tamanthi ထမံသီ Htamanthi
- Village
- Location in Burma
- Coordinates: 25°20′8″N 95°16′51″E
- Country: Burma
- Region: Sagaing Region
- District: Hkamti
- Township: Homalin Township
- Time zone: UTC+6.30 (MST)

Tamanthi, Htamanthi or Tamanthe is a village on the Chindwin River in Homalin Township in Hkamti District in the Sagaing Region of northwestern Burma. It is located near the Tamanthi Wildlife Reserve. It is near the planned multi-purpose Tamanthi Dam. Gardens were planted in Tamanthi and other nearby villages around 1700 and the village has been documented as producing pickled tea, known as "letpet".
