= Nampagan =

- Village
- Location in Burma
- Coordinates: 25°23′N 95°23′E
- Country: Burma
- Region: Sagaing Region
- District: Hkamti District
- Township: Homalin Township
- Time zone: UTC+6.30 (MST)

Nampagan is a village on the Chindwin River in Homalin Township, Hkamti District, in the Sagaing Region of northwestern Burma. It is located north of Hwena.
