= Mansein, Pinlebu =

Mansein မံစိမ်း
- Village
- Location in Myanmar
- Coordinates: 24°19′N 95°19′E
- Country: Myanmar
- Region: Sagaing Region
- District: Kawlin District
- Township: Pinlebu Township
- Village Tract: Yinthar
- Time zone: UTC+6.30 (MMT)

Mansein (Burmese: မံစိမ်း) is a village in Pinlebu Township, Kawlin District, Sagaing Region in northern Myanmar. It is located on the border with Homalin Township about 16 miles (26 km) north of Pinlebu. It is located in the Yinthar village tract.
