= Padung (earring) =

Earring worn by Karo people

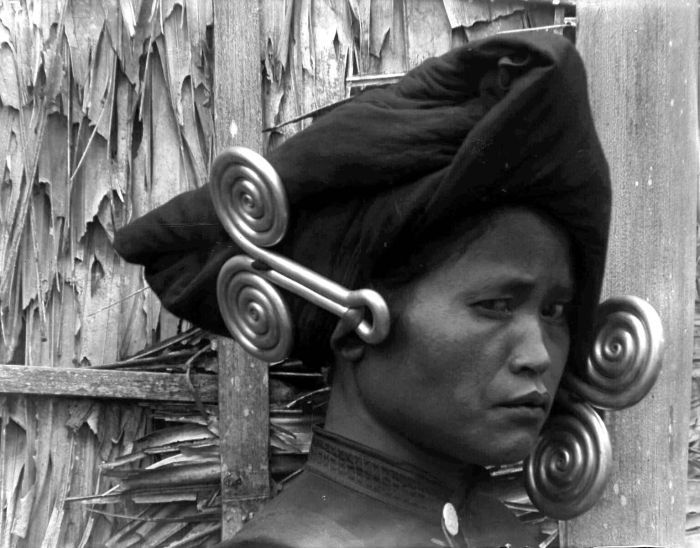
A woman with silver spiral padung earrings.

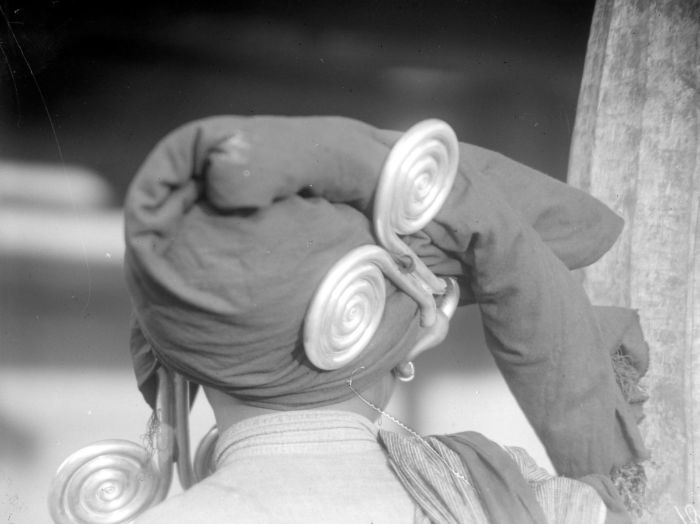
Padung supported by a traditional headscarf worn by a Batak woman.

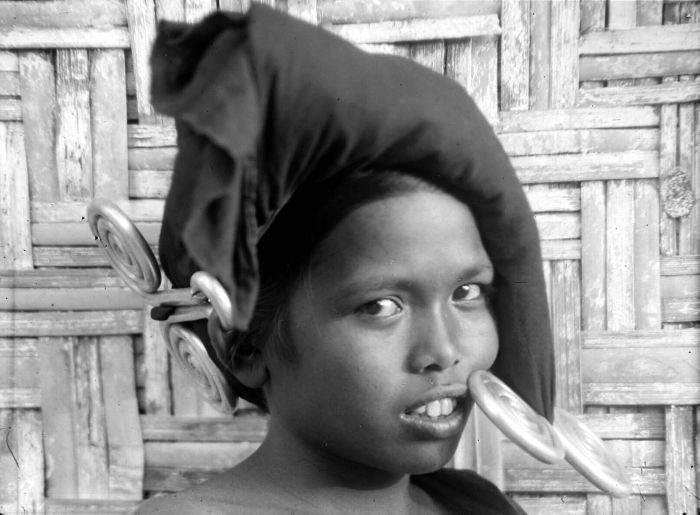

Padung (Dutch: padoeng; also known as padungor) is a type of earring worn by the Karo people of northern Sumatra, Indonesia. The large earrings are attached to a headdress to not tear the earlobe. Padung can be made of copper alloy, silver, bronze, brass, or gold. The design is phallic.

== Gallery ==
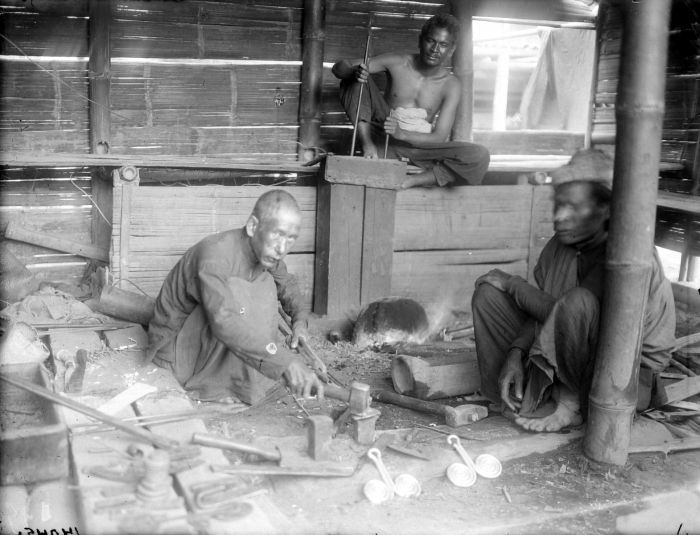
A silversmith in "Kabanjahe"
