= Mezali =

- Village
- Location in Burma
- Coordinates: 24°44′7″N 94°49′25″E
- Country: Burma
- Region: Sagaing Region
- District: Hkamti District
- Township: Homalin Township
- Time zone: UTC+6.30 (MST)

Mezali is a village on the Chindwin River in Homalin Township, Hkamti District, in the Sagaing Region of northwestern Burma. The headworks of the Mon Canals were located at Mezali. The irrigation canal passes into the Chindwin River.
