= Tason =

- Village
- Location in Burma
- Coordinates: 25°7′N 95°3′E
- Country: Burma
- Region: Sagaing Region
- District: Hkamti
- Township: Homalin Township
- Time zone: UTC+6.30 (MST)

Tason is a village on the Chindwin River in Homalin Township, Hkamti District, in the Sagaing Region of northwestern Burma. It is located north of Maungkan. Gardens were planted in Tason around 1700 and the village has been documented as producing pickled tea, known as "letpet".
