= Man Maw, Paungbyin =

Manmaw မန်မော်
- Village
- Location in Myanmar
- Coordinates: 24°18′29″N 94°46′01″E
- Country: Myanmar
- Region: Sagaing Region
- District: Mawlaik District
- Township: Paungbyin Township
- Village Tract: Man Maw
- Time zone: UTC+6.30 (MMT)

Man Maw is a village in Paungbyin Township, Mawlaik District, Sagaing Region in northwestern Myanmar located 4 miles (6.4 km) northwest Paungbyin in the Chindwin River basin.
