= Maungkan =

- Village
- Location in Burma
- Coordinates: 25°5′N 95°2′E
- Country: Burma
- Region: Sagaing Region
- District: Hkamti
- Township: Homalin Township
- Time zone: UTC+6.30 (MST)

Maungkan is a village on the Chindwin River in Homalin Township, Hkamti District, in the Sagaing Region of northwestern Burma. It is located next to Chaungson and south of Tason. Gardens were planted in Maungkan and other nearby villages around 1700 and the village has been documented as producing pickled tea, known as "letpet".
