= Homalin Airport =

- IATA: HOX; ICAO: VYHL

Summary
- Airport type: Public
- Location: Homalin, Sagaing Region, Myanmar
- Time zone: Myanmar Standard Time (+6:30)
- Elevation AMSL: 546 ft / 166 m
- Coordinates: 24°53′58″N 094°54′50″E

Map

Runways
Direction	Length		Surface
Direction	ft	m	Surface
16/34	11,970	3,648	Concrete

Homalin Airport is an airport at Homalin, in the Sagaing Region of Myanmar.
