= Indawgyi Lake =

Lake in Myanmar

- အင်းတော်ကြီး
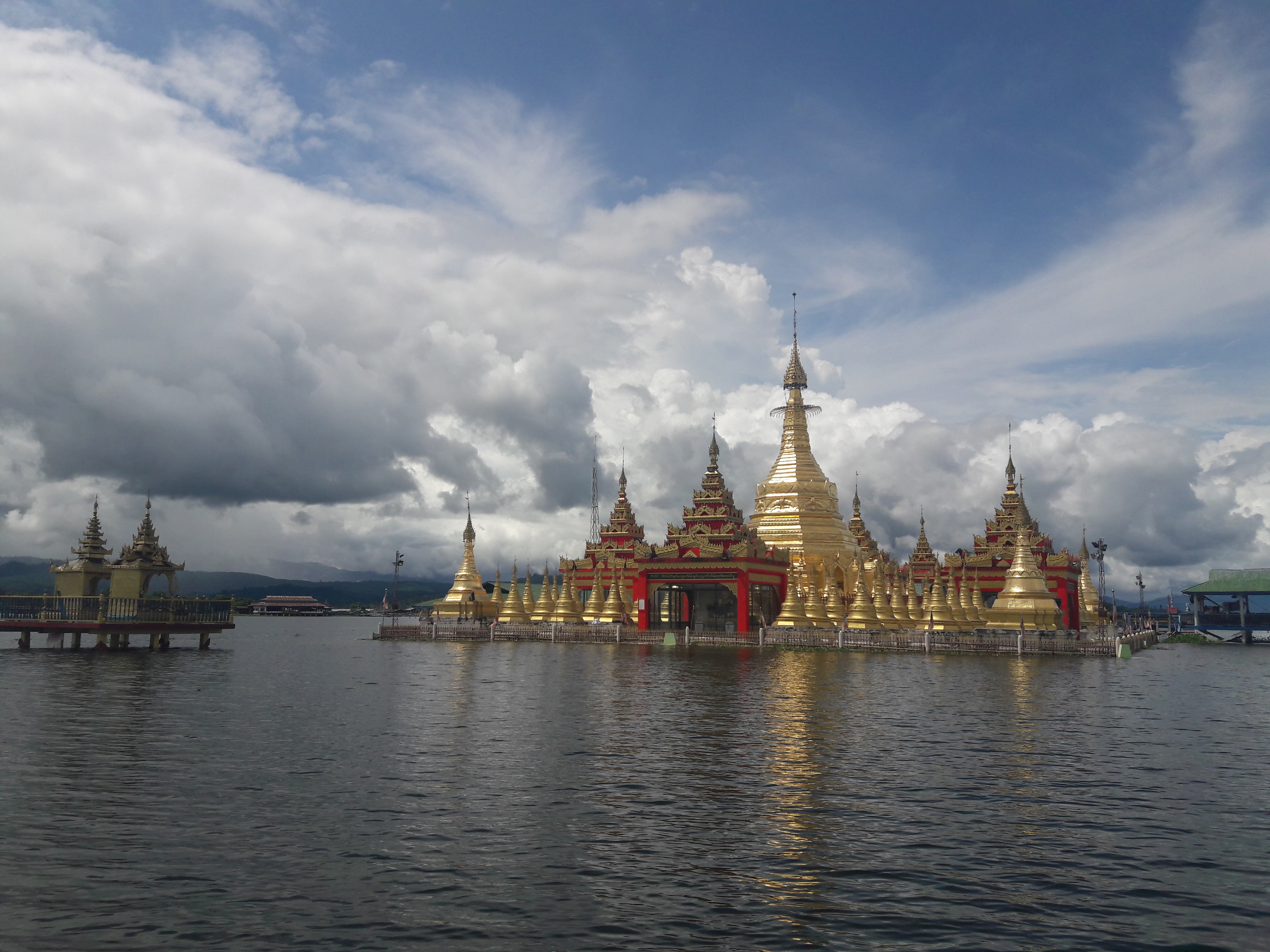
- Indawgyi Pagoda at Indawgyi Lake

- Location within Myanmar
- Location: Kachin State
- Coordinates: 25°8′N 96°20′E
- Type: Tectonic
- Primary outflows: Indaw Chaung (→Irrawaddy River→Andaman Sea)
- Basin countries: Myanmar
- Max. length: 24 km (15 mi)
- Max. width: 13 km (8.1 mi)
- Surface area: 260 km^{2} (100 sq mi)
- Average depth: 22 m (72 ft)

Indawgyi Lake (Burmese: အင်းတော်ကြီး, MLCTS: ang: dau kri: [ʔɪ́ɰ̃.dɔ̀.d͡ʑí]) is the largest lake entirely within Myanmar, and one of the largest inland lakes in Southeast Asia. It is located in Mohnyin Township in Kachin State. The lake measures 13 kilometres (8.1 mi) east to west, and 24 kilometres (15 mi) north to south. There are over 20 villages around the lake. The predominant ethnic groups living in the surroundings of the lake are the Shan and the Kachin, who mainly practise agriculture. The lake is 546 feet (166 m) above sea level and is the main feature of the Indawgyi Lake Wildlife Sanctuary.

It has a length of 14 miles (23 km), width of seven miles and an area of 100 square miles (260 km^{2}). There are 11 village-tracts, 36 villages around the lake; 13 villages are on the bank of the lake.

== Flora and fauna ==
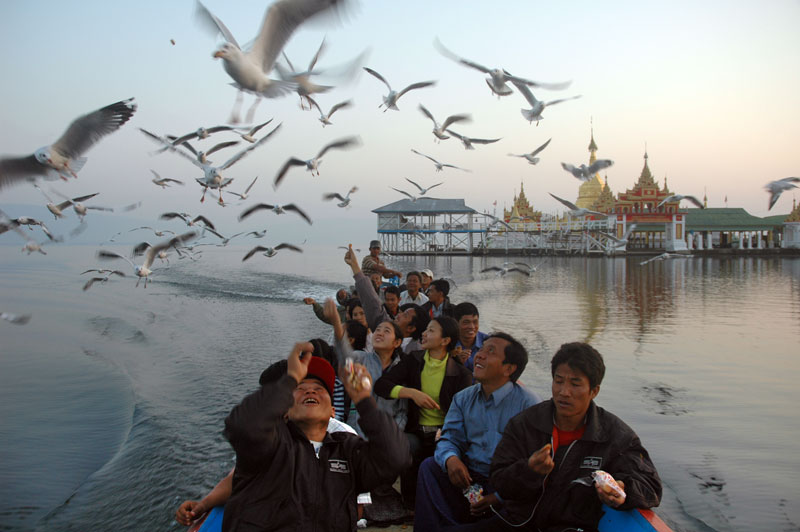
Indawgyi Lake and Indawgyi Pagoda

Indawgyi Lake is within the confines of Indawgyi Lake Wildlife Sanctuary, which was established in 1999 by the Ministry of Ecotourism. The sanctuary, which encompasses 780 km^{2} (300 sq mi), contains a variety of animal species, including rare mammals and birds. Indawgyi hosts more than 65 species of fish, but none are endemic. A few fish that historically were believed to be endemic are now known to also occur elsewhere.

It is one of Myanmar's important bird areas, where 10 endangered species can be found. Of these species, greylag geese, Oriental darter and purple swamphen are prominent during the month of January. A tour of the lake by motor canoe allows one to view a large array of wetland species. It appears that the lake and surrounding wetlands provide an important winter feeding habitat.

Indawgyi area is important for not only waterbird and water dependent bird but also Scavenging Birds like vulture because Indawgyi area holds one of the key vulture populations in Myanmar. Two Critically Endangered vulture species: the white-rumped vulture Gyps bengalensis and slender-billed vulture Gyps tenuirostris inhabit the whole year round and breed in this area.

A large area of natural grassland in the northern part of the lake is the home of the endangered hog deer. Hog deer was discovered in the Indawgyi area in Northern Myanmar during the biodiversity surveys in 2011. A rapid assessment with local people indicated the resident population is facing threats such as subsistence hunting and habitat conversion for agriculture. Subsequent camera trapping in early 2012 confirmed the presence this species in the Indawgyi area.

== Geology ==
Indawgyi Lake is a sag pond, formed at a releasing step-over, with extensional faults associated with the Sagaing Fault – an active strike-slip fault the runs through Myanmar. Movement along the fault created a pull-apart basin similar to the Salton Trough of California. Oral reports suggest the area was once a fertile valley when it suddenly flooded following an earthquake, submerging a village and killing its residents, although it remains unknown if the lake was a result of subsidence or a landslide.

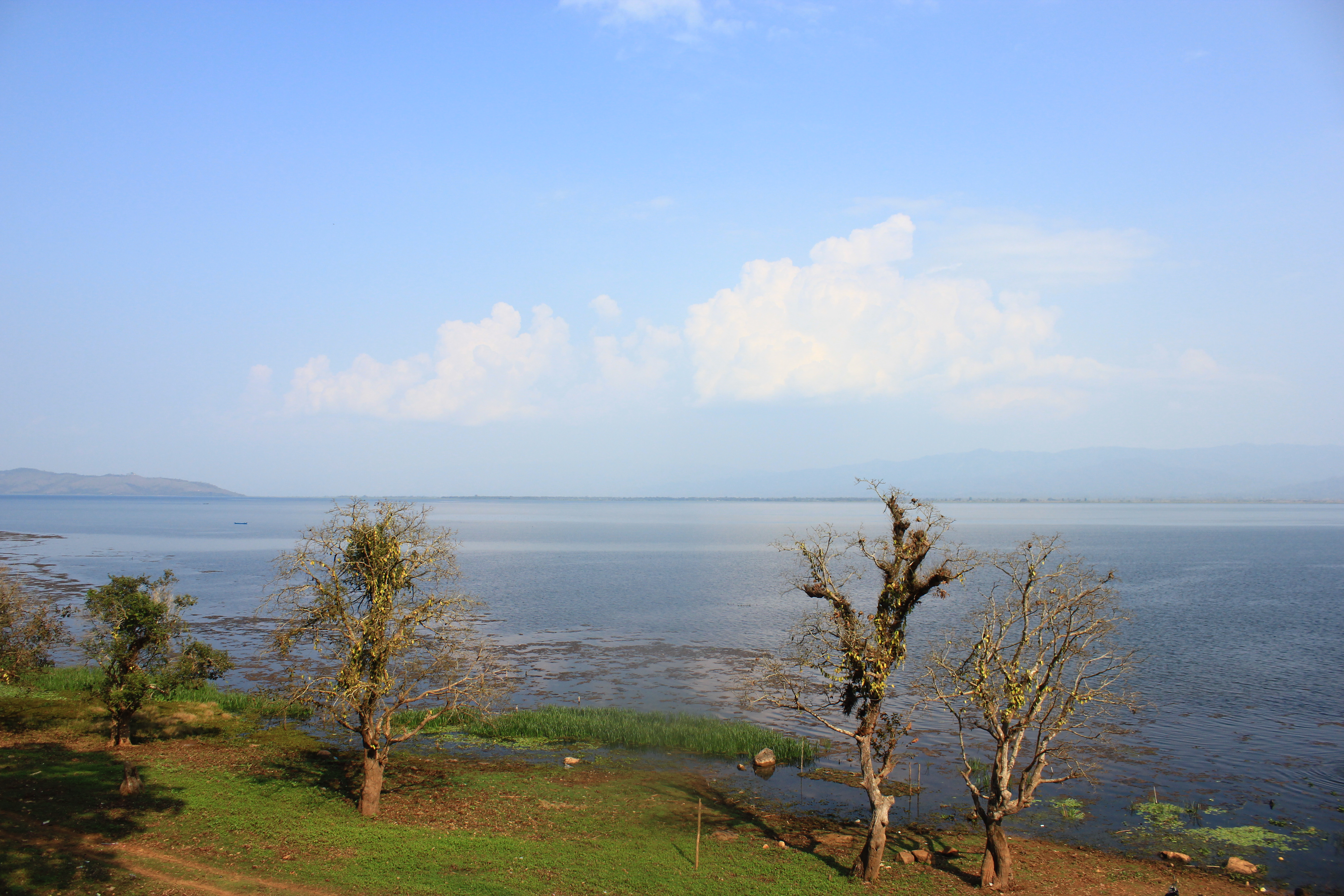
Indawgyi wetland

== Conservation Intervention ==
The first conservation activities in Indawgyi Lake was in the colonial time by establishing 62,000ha of reserved forests for watershed conservation. In the past, the lake was naturally conserve due to the relatively low impact of the local communities. However, many domestic migrants moved to the area in the 1990s and caused a depletion of the natural environment in the lake basin. In recent years, the lake and its watershed forest was recognized as an important conservation area of both national and global levels. Therefore, it was designated as Indawgyi, a Wildlife Sanctuary (1999), an ASEAN Heritage Park (2004), an Asian – Australasian flyway partnership site (2014), a Ramsar site (2016), and a UNESCO Biosphere Reserve (2017) as well as Key Biodiversity Areas (KBA) and Important Bird and Biodiversity Area (IBA).

The comprehensive conservation strategy for Indawgyi Lake is based on practical, integrated solutions, and acknowledges the importance of local participation. The diverse strategy focuses on nine major topics (sustainable fisheries, community forestry, research and monitoring, community-based ecotourism, environmental education, community-based waste management, sanitation, sustainable farming, livelihood development) with individual projects and approaches led by Myanmar forest department with the collaboration of INGO; Fauna & Flora International (FFI), local NGO; Friends of Wildlife, and several CSOs such as Indawgyi Natural Farming Association, Indawgyi Conservation and Development Association, Inn Chit Thu Ecotourism Development group, Shan Cultural Association and Parami Waste Management Group.
