= Homalin District =

Township and District in Sagaing Region, Myanmar

Homalin Township Homalin District ဟုမ္မလင်း မြို့နယ် ဟုမ္မလင်း ခရိုင်
- Township
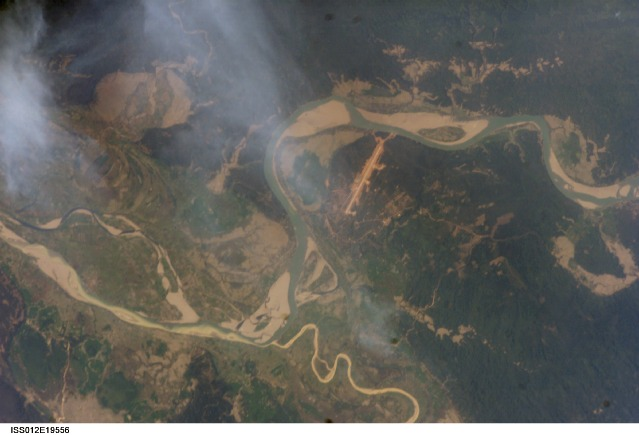
- Satellite view. The long strip is Homalin Airport. The meandering Uyu river can be seen joining the Chindwin river south of the town.

- Location in Sagaing Region
- Coordinates: 24°53′N 94°55′E
- Country: Myanmar
- Region: Sagaing Region
- District: Homalin District
- Capital: Homalin

Area
  - Total: 4,326.45 sq mi (11,205.5 km^{2})

Population (2023)
  - Total: 220,566
  - Density: 50.9808/sq mi (19.6838/km^{2})
- Time zone: UTC+6.30 (MMT)

Homalin Township (Burmese: ဟုမ္မလင်း မြို့နယ် [hóʊɰ̃məlɪ́ɰ̃ mjo̰nɛ̀]) is the only township of Homalin District (Burmese: ဟုမ္မလင်း ခရိုင်) in the Sagaing Region of Myanmar. In 2022, the township was split out from Hkamti District to form the new Homalin District. The principal town is Homalin. The principal rivers flowing through the township are the Chindwin River form north to south and the Uyu River from east to west, joining the Chindwin near Homalin town.

The township is contains 3 towns- the principal town of Homalin, as well as the towns of Shwe Pyi Aye and Mo Waing Lut for a total of 16 urban wards. The township has 76 village tracts grouping 326 villages together.

== History ==
Gardens were first planted along the banks of the Chindwu in Homalin Township around 1700. Several villages such as Tamanthi, Maungkan, Tason, Kawya, Onbet, Maingwe and Malin have been documented as producing pickled tea, known as "laphet".

The 1908 Imperial Gazetteer of India recorded that the steamers of the Irrawaddy Flotilla Company plied weekly between Pakokku and Homalin. Government of Myanmar also plied its launches on this route. During World War II, Homalin on the bank of the Chindwin River, was occupied by the Japanese in late May/early June 1944. Following this, after the Japanese were defeated, the town was combed thoroughly to remove any Japanese soldiers and this was followed by further preparations to counter any Japanese gunboat attacks from the river side.

Naga tribes and their subgroups of Angkul, Nauk-aw, Laing Nang, Hyein Myay, Pain Kuu, Para, Makuri, Smmara, Pon Myo and Kyan Naga live in Homalin Township, apart from other townships such as the Khamti Township, Lahe Township, Layshee Township, Tanai Township, Nan Yon Township and Pan Saung of Sagaing Division.

== Wildlife ==
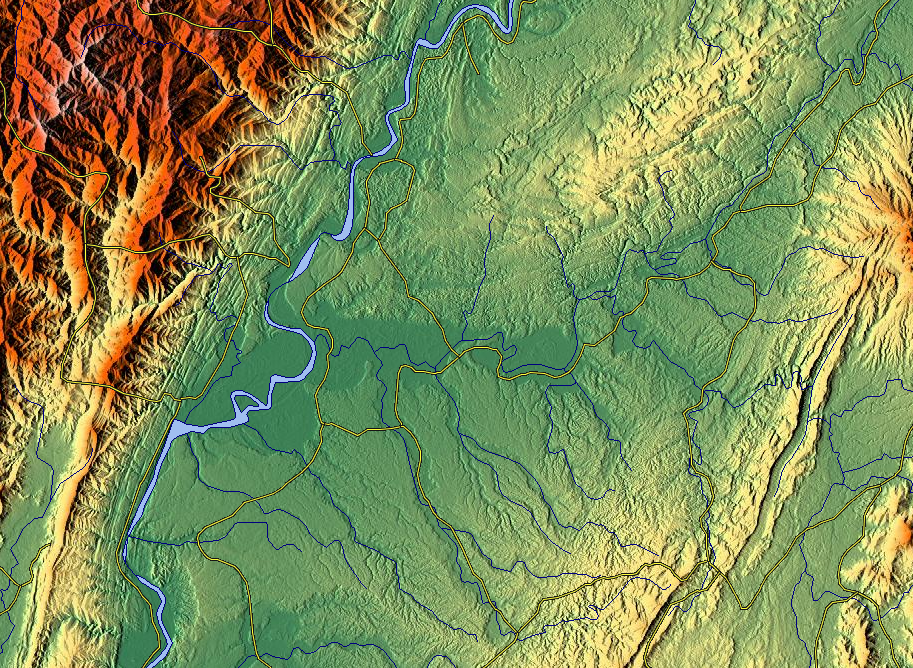
Relief map of the area. The wide river is the Chindwin River.

The Tamanthi Wildlife Sanctuary, which was established on April 11, 1974 on the eastern bank of the Chindwin River, forms part of Hkamti and Homalin Townships in Hkamti District of Sagaing Division. The area covered under this sanctuary is 830.40 square miles (2,150.7 km^{2}), bounded between the Uyu River and Chindwin River; 230.40 square miles (596.7 km^{2}) of this area is under the jurisdiction of the Homalin Township, while 600 square miles (1,600 km^{2}) of the sanctuary is under Khamti Township.

The sanctuary abounds in tigers, elephants, gaur (Asiatic bison), leopards, serow, bear, Sumatran rhinoceros (Didermocherus Sumatrensis) and Javan rhinoceros (Rhinoceros sondaicus). In the past, it was a favourite ground for wildlife hunters and poachers. It is also reported to be home for were-tigers, known in Europe as the European werewolf. Other fauna found here are the white-winged wood duck and masked fin foot. Over all, 30 species of mammals, including the endangered species of Roofed turtle are found here.

== Towns and villages ==
Towns and villages in Homalin include Awthaw, A-Htet Hei Kham (Upper Hei Kham), Chaunggan, Chaungson, Chaungzon, Dokthida, Gwedaukkon, Gwegyi, Gwegyi, Gyobin, Hehkam, Hepet, Hkodaung, Hkomi, Hkonsa, Hmangin, Hmawyonmyaing, Homalin, Hpacheleik, Hpanaing, Htawng-u, Htedanshi, Htingu, Htonmalut, Hulaung, Hunawng, Hunawng, Hupet, Hwebalan, Hwein, Hwekyin, Hwemate, Hwena, Hwepanan, Ingyintha, Intha, Kadaungbwin, Kanbawng, Kaukngo, Kawngkan, Kawngkan, Kawngkankyun, Kawya, Kettha, Kodaungma, Kondan, Kondan, Kondan, Kuntawng, Kwenan, Kyaingkyaing, Kyaukkwe, Kyawngon, Kyebin, Kyizu, Kyun-u, Lawngmin, Lawngpawng, Letagawng, Letpantha, Letsaunggan, Magyibin, Maingdaung, Maingkaing, Maingwe, Makaukpat, Mala, Malin, Malon, Manawtha, Man Huna, Man Kin, Manlinta, Manmaw, Man Maw, Man Maw, Manpa, Mansein, Mansein, Manthe, Man Thet, Mantonhe, Masein, Maungkan, Meng-u, Metkalet, Mezali, Minbwe, Minyagon, Molin, Mongkun, Mong Tawng, Monkali, Myaingtha, Myaukkon, Myauk-ywa, Myene, Myenga, Myintha, Namalin, Namamo, Namaw, Namchaw, Namheinkaw, Namhka, Namhkam, Namhkansi, Namhon, Namhpanwaik, Namhta, Namkut, Namlit, Nammaw, Nammonggwe, Nammu, Nammun, Nampagan, Nampahok, Nampangon, Nampethka, Namponbon, Nampwehlaing, Namset, Namtalan, Namttaw, Namtaungkyin, Na-nauk, Nankaung, Nansabi, Nantat, Nanthabaik, Nanthanyit, Na-ta-kyaik, Nathe, Natnan, Naunghto-ngo, Naungkatiat, Naungmon, Naungpin, Naungpin, Naungtaw, Naungyin, Nawngbamu, Nawnghena, Nawnghkam, Nawnghkun, Nawngkauk, Nawngke, Nawnglun, Nawngmawn, Nawngpang, Nawngpat, Nawngpu-awng, Nawngpuse, Nawngsankyin, Nawngsansaing, Nawngse, Nawngshu, Nawngtaw, Ngauksa, Ngobin, Nonpala, Nwenaing, Nyaungbintha, Nyaunggon, Obokadauk, Onbet, Onbinhin, Padaung, Pahok, Pamalon, Pamun, Panghkok, Panghpahpa, Panghta, Pangshwehlaw, Paukka, Paybin, Payit, Pebin, Pegon, Pehkwin, Peinhnegon, Petkala, Pinma, Pinnoksut, Pinpalu, Poktho, Saguzwe, Sahpe, Saingkun, Saingkyu, Saingme, Sankat, Sankyein, Satkaya, Sauksaik, Sawpaga, Sayetkon, Sedaw, Sezin, Shwedwin, Shwetagun, Sinlamaung, Sinnga, Sitsawk, Sutle, Swekawngaw, Tabaw, Taikat, Talaunggyaung, Tamanthi, Tapan, Tape, Tason, Tatkon, Taungbola, Taungdaw, Taungni-chinywa, Taung-ywa, Tawngbohla, Tawnglin, Tawng-ywa, Tawzi, Teinkin, Teinmata, Tetkon, Thabigon, Thapangaing, Thapanzeik, Thaungdut, Thawun, Thayagon, Thayagon, Thetkedawng, Thitseikkon, Thugyizu, Tilawng, Tonbawdi, Tonhe, Tonleik, Tonlon, Tonlonhupang, Tonmahe, Tonmakeng, Tonmalaw, Tonmate, Tonmatet, Tonmenan, Tonpin, Tonsaga, Tonsahka, Tonzi, Twetwa, Twetwa, Wetka, Yalagaung, Yaza, Yebawmi, Yegyanzin, Yegyaw, Yele, Yele, Yethpa, Ywadanshe, Ywathit, Zedizeik and Zibyugon.

== Languages ==
- Somra language
- Makury language
- Tai Laing language

== Festivals ==
The most famous festival celebrated in the Homalin Township, which is largely inhabited by Naga tribals, is the Kaibi New Year festival on 15 January every year, which is a festival common to all Naga tribals of the entire region. Other festivals by the community are the new housing ceremony, harvesting ceremony and the spiritual worship ceremony.
