= Homalin =

Homalin ဟုမ္မလင်း (ႁုင်းမၢၵ်ႇလၢင်း) Hommalinn, Hônmalin, Honmalin
- Town
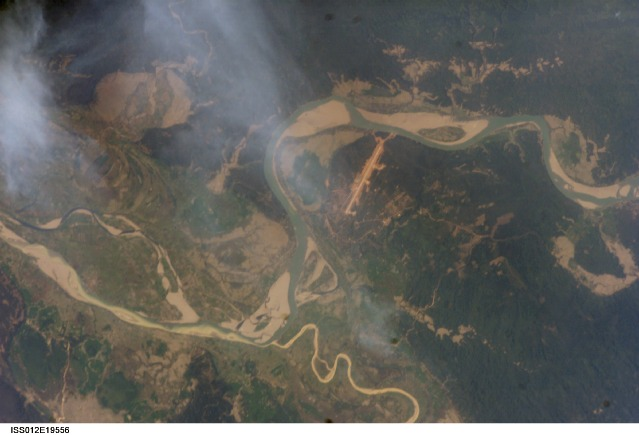
- Satellite view. The long strip is Homalin Airport. The meandering Uyu river can be seen joining the Chindwin river south of the town.

- Location in Myanmar
- Coordinates: 24°53′20″N 94°55′26″E
- Country: Myanmar
- Region: Sagaing Region
- District: Homalin District
- Township: Homalin Township

Area
  - Total: 4.69 sq mi (12.1 km^{2})

Population (2023)
  - Total: 15,265
  - Density: 3,250/sq mi (1,260/km^{2})
- Time zone: UTC+6.30 (MMT)

Homalin or Hommalinn (Burmese: ဟုမ္မလင်း မြို့ [hóʊɰ̃məlɪ́ɰ̃ mjo̰]; Shan: ႁုင်းမၢၵ်ႇလၢင်း) is a small town in north-western Myanmar and capital of the Homalin Township and Homalin District of the Sagaing Region. The town lies on the Chindwin River and is served by Homalin Airport.

The Tamanthi Wildlife Reserve extends into the Homalin Township. Gold has been found in the river sand of Uyu River and extraction has been undertaken jointly with the Russians.

== Etymology ==
Homalin is derived from the Shan name Hongmalang (ႁုင်းမၢၵ်ႇလၢင်း), meaning "jack-banyan", a variety of the banyan tree.

== History ==
The 1908 Imperial Gazetteer of India recorded that the steamers of the Irrawaddy Flotilla Company plied weekly between Pakokku and Homalin. Government of Myanmar also plied its launches on this route. During World War II, Homalin on the bank of the Chindwin River, was occupied by the Japanese in late May/early June 1944. Following this, after the Japanese were defeated, the town was combed thoroughly to remove any Japanese soldiers and this was followed by further preparations to counter any Japanese gunboat attacks from the river side.

On August 6, 1988, an earthquake with an epicentre near Homalin killed 3 people, damaging infrastructure.

Myanmar had the distinction of accounting for 60% of world's heroin supply, in 1997, with the production of about 2500 tonnes of opium. Particularly in North Burma, the Army has been maintaining the drug refineries.The 22nd Infantry Battalion (IB) has a refinery at Homolin, apart from other places in the region, which establishes “The Regime's Complicity in the global drug trade.”

== Geography ==
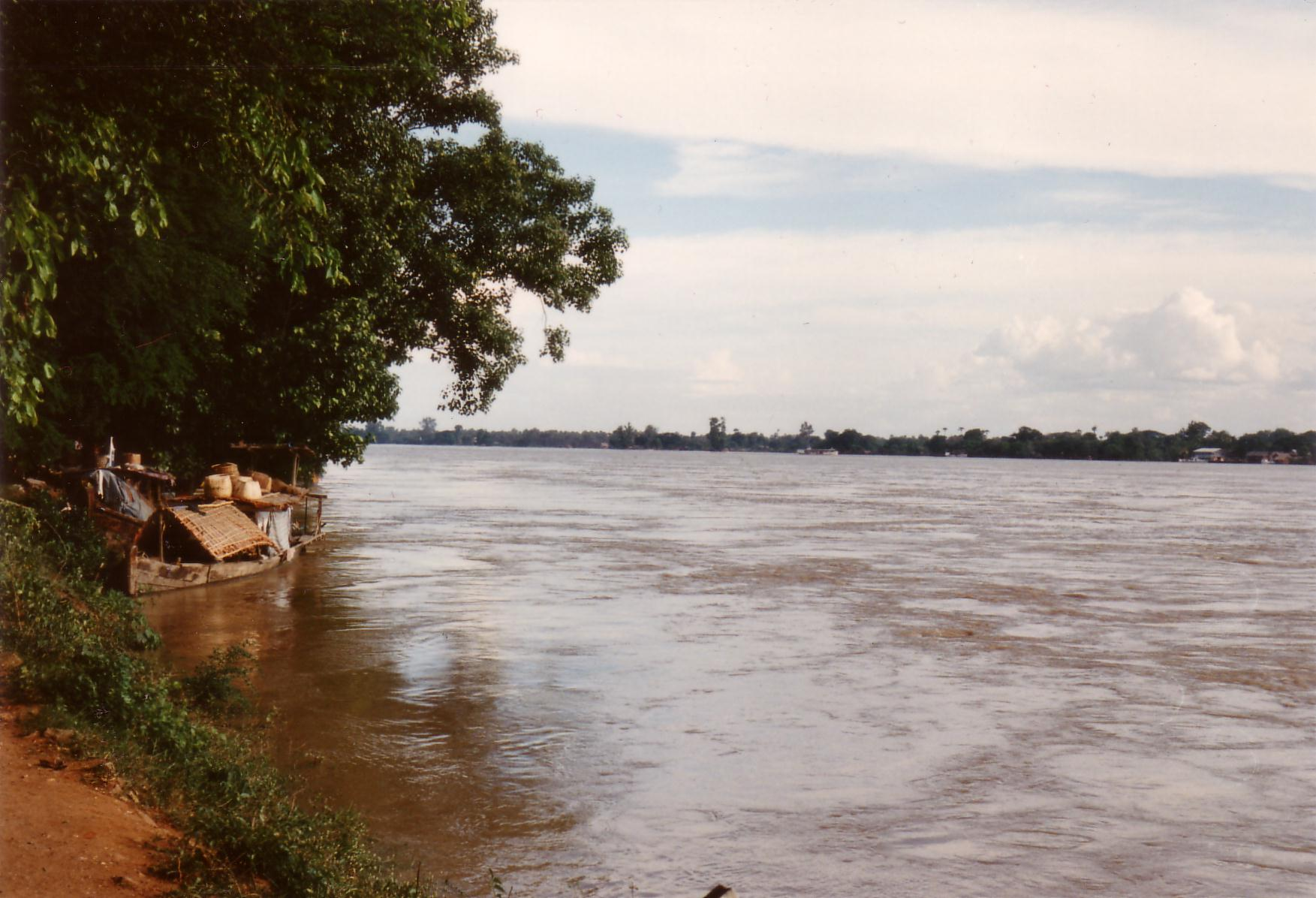
The Chindwin River

Homalin, a small town, lies close to the Indian border, at the head end of a bend in the Chindwin River, after an island. It has the backdrop of large forested mountains, which rise to a height of 9,000 feet (2,700 m). Some amount of cultivation is also seen on the lower slopes of the hills. Geographical area of the Homalin Township is 2,768,927 acres (1,120,545 ha) including arable land of 18,039 acres (7,300 ha) and forest land of 706,317 acres (285,836 ha). The average elevation of the town is 101 m.

The Uyu River, a major tributary of the Chindwin River flows close to Homalin. The sand in this river carries gold particles and also, some times, small nuggets. Local villagers pan this river sand to extract gold dust with the hope of finding small nuggets.

== Climate ==
Homalin has a tropical savanna climate (Köppen Aw), closely bordering on a humid subtropical climate (Cwa) and a tropical monsoon climate (Am). Temperatures are very warm throughout the year, although the winter months (December–February) are milder. There is a winter dry season (November–April) and a summer wet season (May–October).

Climate data for Homalin (1991–2020)
| Month | Jan | Feb | Mar | Apr | May | Jun | Jul | Aug | Sep | Oct | Nov | Dec | Year |
|---|---|---|---|---|---|---|---|---|---|---|---|---|---|
| Record high °C (°F) | 30.5 (86.9) | 34.5 (94.1) | 39.7 (103.5) | 40.0 (104.0) | 43.0 (109.4) | 41.4 (106.5) | 35.7 (96.3) | 36.0 (96.8) | 37.0 (98.6) | 37.7 (99.9) | 33.5 (92.3) | 29.5 (85.1) | 41.4 (106.5) |
| Mean daily maximum °C (°F) | 25.8 (78.4) | 28.5 (83.3) | 31.7 (89.1) | 33.6 (92.5) | 33.4 (92.1) | 31.7 (89.1) | 30.4 (86.7) | 30.9 (87.6) | 31.4 (88.5) | 31.1 (88.0) | 29.1 (84.4) | 26.0 (78.8) | 30.3 (86.5) |
| Daily mean °C (°F) | 18.4 (65.1) | 20.8 (69.4) | 24.1 (75.4) | 26.7 (80.1) | 28.0 (82.4) | 27.9 (82.2) | 27.3 (81.1) | 27.4 (81.3) | 27.3 (81.1) | 26.2 (79.2) | 22.9 (73.2) | 19.1 (66.4) | 24.7 (76.5) |
| Mean daily minimum °C (°F) | 11.1 (52.0) | 13.2 (55.8) | 16.4 (61.5) | 19.9 (67.8) | 22.7 (72.9) | 24.2 (75.6) | 24.2 (75.6) | 24.0 (75.2) | 23.3 (73.9) | 21.4 (70.5) | 16.7 (62.1) | 12.3 (54.1) | 19.1 (66.4) |
| Record low °C (°F) | 5.0 (41.0) | 5.7 (42.3) | 7.4 (45.3) | 15.0 (59.0) | 17.5 (63.5) | 20.0 (68.0) | 19.5 (67.1) | 19.5 (67.1) | 18.0 (64.4) | 14.0 (57.2) | 10.0 (50.0) | 4.2 (39.6) | 4.0 (39.2) |
| Average precipitation mm (inches) | 6.7 (0.26) | 13.0 (0.51) | 22.9 (0.90) | 42.3 (1.67) | 201.3 (7.93) | 420.4 (16.55) | 519.6 (20.46) | 426.3 (16.78) | 354.3 (13.95) | 196.7 (7.74) | 29.8 (1.17) | 8.3 (0.33) | 2,241.6 (88.25) |
| Average precipitation days (≥ 1.0 mm) | 1.0 | 2.0 | 3.5 | 6.1 | 11.5 | 19.5 | 21.3 | 20.1 | 15.8 | 9.9 | 2.6 | 1.1 | 114.4 |
Source 1: World Meteorological Organization
Source 2: Norwegian Meteorological Institute (extremes)

== Demographics ==
The town has a population of roughly 1500 people. The Tai Leng (Shanni), Naga and Kuki ethnic group reside in Homalin, Naga Traditional New Year is celebrated by the nagas and the Kuki celebrate Chavang Kut every year.

=== Transportation system ===
The main artery road in the region is the Thabeikkyin-Phaungbyin-Homalin-Hkamti Road, which is 330 miles (530 km) long. This is being extended and bridges are being built by a Road Construction Special Group-10 to make it an all weather road. A suspension bridge, 1000 ft long and 16 ft wide, was constructed recently across the Uyu River linking Homalin with the Thetkekyin-Phaungpyin-Homalin-Khamti Road.

Country boats, locally known as landwins, also ply in the waters of the Chindwin River to Homalin. Both Irrawaddy and its major tributary the Chindwin River have Inland Water Transport facilities, which are being improved further.

The Homalin Airport (HOX) in the centre of the Homalin town has flights operating to Yangon and Mandalay and is on the popular tourist circuit. It is located at an elevation of 498 feet (152 m) and has a runway of 3,002 feet (915 m) length.

== Economy ==
The climatic conditions in Homalin have been found suitable to grow rubber plantations. The conditions have been well exploited by establishing viable rubber cultivation practices by introducing high-yield strains like the PRIM 600, PB-260, BPM-24, GT-1 and PBIG. This has resulted in expansion of rubber plantation areas in the township, which has created ample employment opportunities to the local people and thus improved their economic conditions and living standards. Pineapple plants are also intercropped within the rubber plantations to make the economic yield from the land even more viable. Since rubber has a worldwide demand, local people have been urged to expand area under cultivate rubber cultivation as also as tea as a commercial venture.

A TV retransmission station has been set up in Homalin, as part of establishing such stations at 41 townships of the Sagaing, Mandalay and Magway Divisions.

Mineral extraction

The exploration of gold from the Uyu River in Homalin got a boost when the Geological Survey and Mineral Exploration Department of Myanmar and the Victorious Glory International of Russia signed a deal for exploration of "gold and associated minerals".

=== Hydropower development ===
As a part of the overall economic development of the Chindwin region in its upper reaches, several hydropower projects have been planned on the Chindwin River, which includes the Homalin Hydropower Project with a capacity of 150 MW. This project also envisages benefits of irrigation.

The Tamanthi Dam which is component part of the Tamanthi Hydroelectric Project (installed capacity 1200 MW) on the Chindwin River, which was under planning and investigations since 2004, is to be implemented with assistance from the Government of India, following a Memorandum of Understanding (MOU) signed on September 16, 2008 between the National Hydroelectric Power Corporation (NHPC) of India and the Government of Burma, as a joint venture project. The submergence under this project which is now under implementation, has serious issues of displacements of 380 families from Leivomjang and Tazong villages that would come under submergence between Tamanthi and Homalin in Sagaing Division.
