= Uyu River =

River in northern Myanmar

Coordinates: 24°51′N 94°57′E

The Uyu River, also pronounced Uru River (Uyu Chaung in Burmese), is a river in northern Myanmar, formerly Burma. It is a major tributary of the Chindwin River, itself the largest tributary of the country's chief river, the Ayeyarwady. Its source lies in the Hukawng Valley of Kachin State, and it takes a southwesterly course through a fertile and well irrigated valley. It enters the Chindwin on the left bank at Homalin in Sagaing Division.

== Economy ==
Hpakant, situated in the headwaters of the Uyu, is the only place in the world where the best quality jade known as jadeite is mined. Sand and stones deposited from jade mining operations have impeded the flow during the monsoons and caused flooding with damage to the roads. 'Gold boats' that mine the riverbed for precious metals began to appear in the 1990s along the 215 km stretch of the Uyu from Haungpa to Homalin. A cleanup plan by a government-appointed special environment committee started in May 2004 with a ban on gold digging, and the jade miners were made responsible for the rehabilitation of a 26 km stretch out of the badly damaged 40 km of the river between Lonkin and Haungpa.

== Flora and fauna ==
The area is covered with primarily tropical evergreen forest, dense bamboo and rattan undergrowth. Mixed deciduous teak forest is also seen on higher slopes. Htamanthi Wildlife Sanctuary for the tiger and the rhinoceros is located between the Uyu and the Chindwin.

The Uyu River is an important conservation area for the green peafowl (Pavo muticus), the spot-billed pelican (Pelecanus philippensis) and the white-rumped vulture (Gyps bengalensis).

== World War II ==
In May 1942 after the Japanese invaded Burma, the US Army General Uncle Joe Stilwell led his staff of 103 Americans, British and Chinese on foot setting out from Shwebo to India. He carried bully beef to his raft across the Uyu River, pictured wearing his underwear and campaign hat. They were joined by Gordon Seagrave of Burma Surgeon fame and his team of Burmese nurses on their journey down the Uyu on rafts reaching Maingkaing in two days and Homalin after another three days of rafting.
