= Hkamti District =

Khamti District ခန္တီးခရိုင်
- District
- Coordinates: 26°00′N 95°41′E
- Country: Myanmar
- Region: Sagaing Region
- No. of Townships: 1
- Capital: Hkamti
- Time zone: UTC+6.30 (MMT)

Hkamti District or Khamti District (sometimes formerly Naga Hills District) is a district in northern Sagaing Region of Myanmar (Burma). Its administrative center is the town of Hkamti.

== Townships ==
The District only contains one township - Hkamti Township. Prior to 2022, the district also included Homalin Township, which was promoted to its own district in April 2022 by the Ministry of Home Affairs

Prior to 2010, it additionally controlled Lahe, Lay Shi (Lashe), and Nanyun townships, which were transferred under the 2008 Constitution to the Naga Self-Administered Zone. The revised smaller district still has a significant minority Naga population.

== Borders ==
Hkamti District is bordered by:

- India to the west
- Naga Self-Administered Zone to the west and north,
- Myitkyina District and Mohnyin District of Kachin State to the east.
- Homalin District to the south,

== Economy ==
Most people in Hkamti District practice subsistence farming. There is also a jade mine, although most of the jade mining is nearby in Mohnyin District.

== Demographics ==
The district is inhabited by the Khamti, Duleng (Kachin) and Nung Rawang people.
