= Thayagon, Pinhinkhar =

Tharyagon သာယာကုန်း
- Village
- Location in Myanmar
- Coordinates: 24°25′25″N 95°45′1″E
- Country: Myanmar
- Region: Sagaing Region
- District: Katha District
- Township: Banmauk Township
- Village tract: Pinhinkhar
- Time zone: UTC+6.30 (MMT)

Thayagon (Burmese: သာယာကုန်း) is a village in eastern Banmauk Township, Katha District, in the Sagaing Region of north-central Myanmar. It is located about 7 miles (11 km) west of Banmauk on the Katha-Indaw-Mansi road. It is part of the Pinhinkhar village tract.
