= Kyungon =

Kyungon may refer to any one of several places in Burma (Myanmar):

== Ayeyarwady Region ==
- Kyungon, Danubyu in Danubyu Township
- Kyungôn in Pathein Township
- Kyungon, Wakema in Wakema Township

== Bago Region ==
- Kyungon, Bago Township in Bago Township
- Kyungon, Daik-U in Daik-U Township
- Kyungon, Gyobingauk in Gyobingauk Township
- Kyungon, Nyaunglebin in Nyaunglebin Township
- Kyungon (18°28'0"N 96°35'0"E) in Pyu Township
- Kyungon (18°18'0"N 96°32'0"E) in Pyu Township
- Kyungon, Shwegyin in Shwegyin Township
- Kyungon, Taungoo in Taungoo Township
- Kyungon, Tharrawaddy in Tharrawaddy Township
- Onhnèye also known as Kyungon in Kyauktaga Township

== Kachin State ==
- Kyungon, Kachin in Mohnyin Township

== Sagaing Region ==
- Kyungon, Banmauk in Banmauk Township
- Kyungon, Kanbalu in Kanbalu Township
- Kyungon, Wuntho in Wuntho Township

== Yangon Region ==
- Kyungon, Yangon in Hlegu Township
