= Magyigon =

Magyigon is the name of several places in Myanmar:

- Magyigon, Ganan Magyigon village tract, Banmauk Township, Sagaing Region
- Magyigon, Man In village tract, Banmauk Township, Sagaing Region
- Magyigon, Mansigyi village tract, Banmauk Township, Sagaing Region
- Magyigon, Yaetwingon village tract, Banmauk Township, Sagaing Region
