= Thayetkon, Pinbon =

Thayetkon သရက်ကုန်း
- Village
- Location in Myanmar
- Coordinates: 24°31′N 95°42′E
- Country: Myanmar
- Region: Sagaing Region
- District: Katha District
- Township: Banmauk Township
- Village tract: Pinbon
- Time zone: UTC+6.30 (MMT)

Thayetkon (Burmese: သရက်ကုန်း) is a village in central Banmauk Township, Katha District, in the Sagaing Region of north-central Myanmar. It is about 15 miles (24 km) northwestwards along the Katha-Indaw-Mansi road from Banmauk. It is part of the Pinbon village tract.
