= Thaunggyi, Banmauk =

Thaunggyi သောင်ကြီး
- Village
- Location in Myanmar
- Coordinates: 24°18′N 95°56′E
- Country: Myanmar
- Region: Sagaing Region
- District: Katha District
- Township: Banmauk Township
- Village Tract: Simaw
- Time zone: UTC+6.30 (MMT)

Thaunggyi (Burmese: သောင်ကြီး) is a village in southeastern Banmauk Township, Katha District, in the Sagaing Region of north-central Myanmar about 8.2 miles (13.2 km) south of Banmauk only about 1.2 miles (1.9 km) from the border with Indaw Township. It is part of the Simaw village tract.
