= Htigyaing =

Htigyaing ထီးချိုင့်မြို့ Tigyaing
- Town
- Location in Burma
- Coordinates: 23°46′0″N 96°8′0″E
- Country: Myanmar
- Division: Sagaing Region
- District: Katha District
- Township: Htigyaing Township
- Time zone: UTC+6.30 (MST)

Htigyaing (Burmese: ထီးချိုင့်မြို့), also spelt Tigyaing, is a town in eastern Sagaing Division, in northern Myanmar. It is a port on the Irrawaddy River and the administrative seat of Tigyaing Township.

== History ==
When the Mongols first invaded Burma in 1277, the excessive heat forced them to turn back at Htigyaing which was later taken along with Tagaung in 1283 eventually leading to the fall of the kingdom of Bagan. The Saopha of Wuntho rose up in rebellion in 1891 and attacked Kawlin forcing the British to fall back on Htigyaing.

On 7 November 2023, the town was attacked by allied anti-junta forces during the country's ongoing civil war. The fighting continued for over three months, with junta airstrikes destroying over 90% of the town during the battle.

== Transport and economy ==
Katha – Htigyaing section of the Shwebo – Myitkyina road has been shortened in recent years from 58 miles to just over 26 miles by Mezar Bridge linking Htigyaing with Indaw. Rice paddies, rubber and teak plantations constitute the main agricultural activities in the area.

=== Fishing ===
In 1980s Htigyaing, four pounds of fish could be caught in minutes using a hand fishing net. The region is filled with troughs that fill with floodwaters during the monsoon season or heavy rains. Once the flood subsides, the troughs and their fish become isolated. Bamboo traps stop fish so fishers can catch them and put them in large dug pits. Once the pit is full, a gong is struck and villagers come to distribute the catch. Fish populations were stable and abundant until the late 1980s. Timber harvesting, sand dredging, infrastructure projects and gold mining are leading to local ecosystems and habitats being destroyed. Breeding rates have been plummeting, and fish are migrating further upstream to find stable habitats. Local cultural customs are being eroded. For example, local elders tried to organize a proper burial for a dead Irrawaddy dolphin during an infrastructure project but failed.
