= Thayagon, Sikataung =

Tharyagon သာယာကုန်း
- Village
- Location in Myanmar
- Coordinates: 24°26′1″N 95°37′20″E
- Country: Myanmar
- Region: Sagaing Region
- District: Katha District
- Township: Banmauk Township
- Village tract: Sikataung
- Time zone: UTC+6.30 (MMT)

Thayagon (Burmese: သာယာကုန်း) is a village in western Banmauk Township, Katha District, in the Sagaing Region of north-central Myanmar. It is located about 14 miles (23 km) west of Banmauk. It is part of the Sikataung village tract.
