= Shwegyaung, Pinhinkhar =

Shwegyaung ရွှေကျောင်း
- Village
- Location in Myanmar
- Coordinates: 24°25′N 95°45′E
- Country: Myanmar
- Region: Sagaing Region
- District: Katha District
- Township: Banmauk Township
- Village tract: Pinhinkhar
- Time zone: UTC+6.30 (MMT)

Shwegyaung (Burmese: ရွှေကျောင်း) is a village in eastern Banmauk Township, Katha District, in the Sagaing Region of northern-central Myanmar. It is located 5.5 miles (8.9 km) west of Banmauk along the Katha-Indaw-Mansi road. It is part of the Pinhinkhar village tract.
