= Mingon =

Mingon is the name of several villages in Sagaing Region, Myanmar:

- Mingon, Leiksaw Mingon village tract, Banmauk Township
- Mingon, Man In village tract, Banmauk Township
