= Wuntho (disambiguation) =

Wuntho is a historical Shan state in Upper Burma.

Wuntho may also refer to:

- Wuntho Township, a third level administrative area in Katha District, Sagaing Region, Myanmar
- Wuntho, Myanmar, the town in Wuntho Township
