= Magyigon, Yaetwingon =

Magyigon မကျီးကုန်း
- Village
- Location in Myanmar
- Coordinates: 24°16′N 95°51′E
- Country: Myanmar
- Region: Sagaing Region
- District: Katha District
- Township: Banmauk Township
- Village Tract: Yaetwingon
- Time zone: UTC+6.30 (MMT)

Magyigon (Burmese: မကျီးကုန်း) is a village in southern Banmauk Township, Katha District, Sagaing Region in northern Myanmar. It is located about 9 miles (14 km) south of Banmauk near the villages of Yaetwingon and Namalut. It is located within the Yaetwingon village tract.
