= Naungkut =

Naungkut is the name of several villages in Sagaing Region, Myanmar:

- Naungkut, Man In village tract, Banmauk Township
- Naungkut, Naungkan village tract, Banmauk Township
