= Shwegyaung =

Shwegyaung may refer to several places in northern Myanmar:

- Shwegyaung, Bhamo Township, Kachin State
- Shwegyaung, Ganan Shwegyaung village tract, Banmauk Township, Sagaing Region
- Shwegyaung, Lone Kin Shwegyaung village tract, Banmauk Township, Sagaing Region
- Shwegyaung, Pinhinkhar village tract, Banmauk Township, Sagaing Region
