= Magyigon, Mansigyi =

Magyigon မကျီးကုန်း
- Village
- Location in Myanmar
- Coordinates: 24°41′N 95°44′E
- Country: Myanmar
- Region: Sagaing Region
- District: Katha District
- Township: Banmauk Township
- Village Tract: Mansigyi
- Time zone: UTC+6.30 (MMT)

Magyigon Burmese: မကျီးကုန်း) is a village in northern Banmauk Township, Katha District, Sagaing Region in northern Myanmar. It is located about 20 miles (32 km) northwest of Banmauk in the Uyu River basin. It is closely connected with the village of Mansi, Banmauk Township and falls within the administrative jurisdiction of the Mansigyi village tract.
