= Thayetkon =

Thayetkon may refer to several places in Burma:

- Thayetkon, Manyugyi village tract, Banmauk Township, Sagaing Region
- Thayetkon, Pinbon village tract, Banmauk Township, Sagaing Region
- Thayetkon, Manlaung Paypin village tract, Banmauk Township, Sagaing Region
