= Thayetkon, Manyugyi =

Thayetkon သရက်ကုန်း
- Village
- Location in Myanmar
- Coordinates: 24°19′2″N 95°33′26″E
- Country: Myanmar
- Region: Sagaing Region
- District: Katha District
- Township: Banmauk Township
- Village tract: Manyugyi
- Time zone: UTC+6.30 (MMT)

Thayetkon (Burmese: သရက်ကုန်း) is a village in southern Banmauk Township, Katha District, in the Sagaing Region of north-central Myanmar. It is about 20 miles (32 km) northeast of Pinlebu. It is part of the Manyugyi village tract.
