= Pula (disambiguation) =

Pula is a city in Istria, Croatia.

Pula may also refer to:

== Places ==
- Pula, Banmauk, a village in Burma
- Pula, Tibet, a village in the Tibet Autonomous Region of China
- Pula, Hungary, a village in Veszprém county
- Pula, Sardinia, a comune in the Province of Cagliari

== People ==
- Pula (surname), surname
- Pula (futsal), full name Vágner Kaetano Pereira, Russian futsal player
- PuLa, a short form of the name of Marathi theatre personality Purushottam Laxman Deshpānde

== Other uses ==
- Botswana pula, the currency and the national motto of Botswana
- Pula (journal), a journal of African studies published in Botswana
- Pula River, a river of Ecuador
- Pula, a vulgar Romanian word for penis (see Romanian profanity)
- Pula, another name of the Filipino crab paste taba ng talangka
- The Albanian word for chicken

== See also ==
- Pula language (disambiguation)
- Puzha (disambiguation)
