= Kangon =

Kangon is the name of some villages in Burma:

- Kangon, Pinlebu Township, Sagaing Region
- Kangon, Banmauk Township, Sagaing Region
