= Naungkut, Man In =

Naungkut နောင်ကွတ်
- Village
- Location in Myanmar
- Coordinates: 24°42′N 95°42′E
- Country: Myanmar
- Region: Sagaing Region
- District: Katha District
- Township: Banmauk Township
- Village Tract: Man In
- Time zone: UTC+6.30 (MMT)

Naungkut (Burmese: နောင်ကွတ်) is a village in northern Banmauk Township, Katha District, in the Sagaing Region of northern Myanmar. It is located about 23 miles (37 km) northwest of Banmauk in the Uyu River basin. It is located within the Man In village tract.
