= Mankat =

- Village
- Location in Burma
- Coordinates: 24°16′20″N 95°50′18″E
- Country: Burma
- Region: Sagaing Region
- District: Katha District
- Township: Banmauk Township
- Time zone: UTC+6.30 (MST)

Mankat is a large village in Banmauk Township, Katha District, in the Sagaing Region of northern-central Burma. The area is known for its Mankat Forest reserve.

== History ==
S. St. R. Korper, an Assistant Superintendent, was responsible for building a 46 miles (74 km) road from Mankat to Nawpawng, according to a 1920 British report. In World War II, Bernard Fergusson, Baron Ballantrae, then a major, passed through Mankat via Bonchaung Gorge with the Black Watch unit of the 77th Indian Infantry Brigade.in March 1943. The Japanese had a base at Mankat, which was bombed by the US along with Mogok on 4 January 1945. During conflict in the village in 1980, four houses were burned down.

== Geography ==
The village lies in the Nam Pang River valley to the south of Banmauk, and is surrounded by Mankat Forest, a protected forest reserve.
