= Naunglon =

- Village
- Location in Burma
- Coordinates: 24°24′N 95°33′E
- Country: Burma
- Region: Sagaing Region
- District: Katha District
- Township: Banmauk Township
- Time zone: UTC+6.30 (MST)

Naunglon is a village in Banmauk Township, Katha District, in the Sagaing Region of northern-central Myanmar about 230 mi (or 369 km) south-east of Nay Pyi Taw, the country's capital, 38 mile from Bamauk and 35 miles from Pinlebu. It has 140 households and one Buddhist monastery, one primary school, and one pre-school. It is a middle sized village in that region. The village economy is mainly farming, digging for gold, and forests (timber, bamboo). Houses are built with timber and bamboo. The villagers are Buddhist and speak Shan (Shan Ni which derives from Tibet) and Kadu. The level of economic development, education and health care of the village is below the average.
