= Thayetkon, Manlaung Paypin =

Thayetkon သရက်ကုန်း
- Village
- Location in Myanmar
- Coordinates: 24°38′N 95°40′E
- Country: Myanmar
- Region: Sagaing Region
- District: Katha District
- Township: Banmauk Township
- Village tract: Manlaung Paypin
- Time zone: UTC+6.30 (MMT)

Thayetkon (Burmese: သရက်ကုန်း) is a village in north-central Banmauk Township, Katha District, in the Sagaing Region of north-central Myanmar. It is about 4 miles (6.4 km) southwest along the Katha-Indaw-Mansi road from Mansi, Myanmar in the Uyu River basin. It is part of the Manlaung Paypin village tract.
