= Lemi (disambiguation) =

Lemi is a municipality in Finland. Lemi may also refer to

- Lemi (name)
- Lemi, Banmauk, a village in Burma
- Lemi, Ethiopia, a city in Ethiopia
- LEMI, the ICAO code for Región de Murcia International Airport
