= Shwegyaung, Ganan Shwegyaung =

Shwegyaung ရွှေကျောင်း
- Village
- Location in Myanmar
- Coordinates: 24°26′N 95°29′E
- Country: Myanmar
- Region: Sagaing Region
- District: Katha District
- Township: Banmauk Township
- Village Tract: Ganan Shwegyaung
- Time zone: UTC+6.30 (MMT)

Shwegyaung (Burmese: ရွှေကျောင်း) is a village in western Banmauk Township, Katha District, in the Sagaing Region of north-central Myanmar. It is located 25 miles (40 km) north of Pinlebu in the Ganan valley. It is part of the Ganan Shwegyaung village tract.
