= Pegon =

Pegon may refer to:

- Pegon script, a modified Arabic script used to write the Javanese, Sundanese, and Madurese languages

== Places in Myanmar ==
- Pegon, Homalin, a village in Hkamti District, Sagaing Region
- Pegon, Lelnetgyi a village in Banmauk Township, Katha District, Sagain Region
- Pegon, Nantat, a village in Banmauk Township, Katha District, Sagaing Region
