= Aunggon =

- Village
- Location in Burma
- Coordinates: 24°2′N 96°3′E
- Country: Burma
- Region: Sagaing Region
- District: Katha District
- Township: Indaw Township
- Time zone: UTC+6.30 (MST)

Aunggon is a village in Indaw Township, Katha District, in the Sagaing Region of northern-central Burma. A river runs to the west of the village.
