= Le-u, Hechein =

Lel-u
- Village
- Location in Myanmar
- Coordinates: 24°28′N 95°30′E
- Country: Myanmar
- Region: Sagaing Region
- District: Katha District
- Township: Banmauk Township
- Village Tract: Hechein
- Time zone: UTC+6.30 (MMT)

Le-u (Burmese: လယ်ဦး) is a village in Banmauk Township, Katha District, in the Sagaing Region of northern-central Myanmar. It is part of the Hechein village tract.
