= Monument to the fallen officers and soldiers against Japanese Aggression =

War memorial in Myanmar

The Monument to the fallen officers and soldiers against Japanese Aggression (Chinese: 抗日陣亡官兵紀念碑) is a monument in Myanmar that commemorates the fallen officers and soldiers who fought against Japanese invasion of Burma. It is located at Tar Shwe Htan, Laukkaing, Shan State, and was built by Chiefdom of Kokang Sao Edward Yang Kyein Tsai in 1951.

It is built as an 11-meter-high pagoda engraved with the names and inscriptions of the Kokang soldiers and civilians who died in the war.
