= Mingon, Leiksaw Mingon =

Mingon မင်းကုန်း
- Village
- Location in Myanmar
- Coordinates: 24°11′N 95°53′E
- Country: Myanmar
- Region: Sagaing Region
- District: Katha District
- Township: Banmauk Township
- Village Tract: Leiksaw Mingon
- Time zone: UTC+6.30 (MMT)

Mingon (Burmese: မင်းကုန်း) is a village in southern Banmauk Township, Katha District, in the Sagaing Region of north-central Myanmar, located close to the border with Wuntho Township. It is located in the Leiksaw Mingon village tract.
