= Myo Zaw Aung =

Burmese politician

Myo Zaw Aung MP
- မျိုးဇော်အောင်
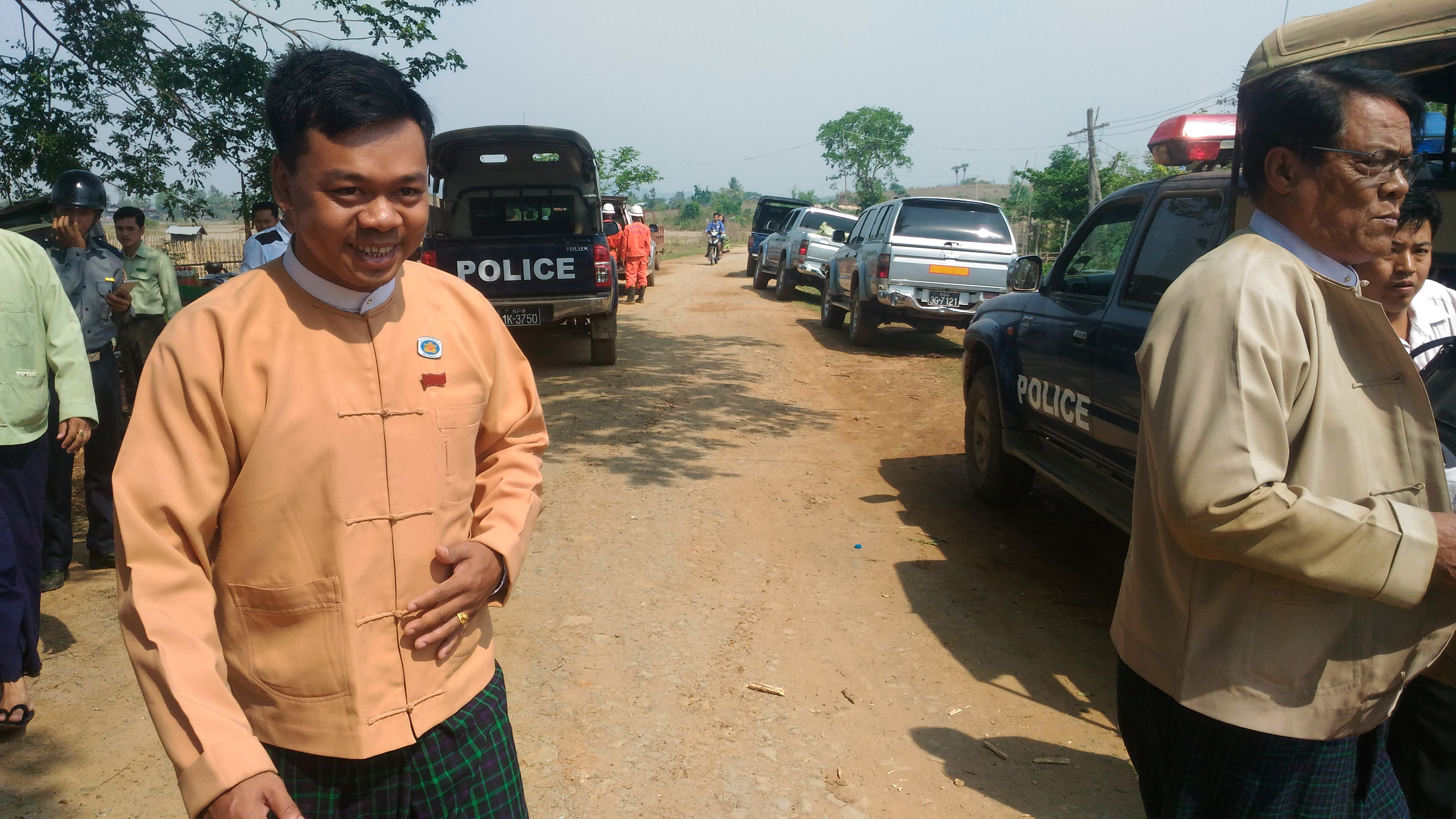

Member of the House of Representatives
- Incumbent
- Assumed office 1 February 2016
- Preceded by: Tin Win
- Constituency: Kawlin Township

Personal details
- Born: 14 August 1980 (age 46) Kawlin, Myanmar
- Party: National League for Democracy
- Spouse: Ei Mon Swe (m. 2013)
- Parent(s): Pann Kyaing (father); Nyunt Sein (mother)
- Education: Institute of Medicine, Mandalay
- Occupation: Politician

Myo Zaw Aung (Burmese: မျိုးဇော်အောင်; born 14 August 1980) is a Burmese politician who currently serves as a member of parliament in the House of Representatives for Kawlin Township constituency. He is one of the founders of the National Democratic Force (NDF).

== Early life and education ==
Myo Zaw Aung was born on 14 August 1980 in Kawlin, Sagaing Region, Myanmar. He graduated from high school in 1999 and enrolled at the Institute of Medicine, Mandalay in 2000. He also studied in Indiana University and University of Washington.

== Political career ==
Myo joined the NLD youth branch in 2002 and worked for Aung San Suu Kyi's security. He was detained for 6 months in Khan-Ti Prison in May 2003 after the Depayin massacre. He worked for the National Democratic Force as a CEC member and a joint secretary of CEC.

In 2010 election, he contested from Kawlin Township constituency. He wanted to amend the 2008 constitution by participating in the parliament but he lost the seat with 25,011 votes to his competitor's 27,184. He resigned from the NDF in 2011 and founded a political education organization called The Innovative.

Myo Zaw Aung wrote an election analysis paper called An Accelerated Move about the 2012 by-election for the Friedrich-Naumann-Foundation for Freedom. He is an alumnus of the Diplomacy Training Program, International Academy for Freedom, European Union Visitor Program (EUVP), and the Jackson School of the University of Washington.

In the 2015 Myanmar general election, he contested the Kawlin Township constituency and won a House of Representatives seat. He currently serves as a member of International Relation Committee and Interparliamentary Union Committee of House of Representatives.
