= Kangon, Pinlebu =

Kangon
- Village
- Location in Myanmar
- Coordinates: 24.08537°N 95.44347°E
- Country: Myanmar
- Region: Sagaing Region
- District: Kawlin District
- Township: Pinlebu Township
- Village Tract: Kangon
- Time zone: UTC+6.30 (MMT)

Kangon (Burmese: ကံကုန်း) is a village in Pinlebu Township, Kawlin District, in Sagaing Region, Myanmar. It is located about 5 miles east of the town of Pinlebu and is the principal village of its village tract. On 24 February 2011, the two villages of Kangon East and Kangon West were merged itno the modern village of Kangon.
