= Le-u, Kyauktan =

Lel-u
- Village
- Location in Myanmar
- Coordinates: 24.29208°N 95.90145°E
- Country: Myanmar
- Region: Sagaing Region
- District: Katha District
- Township: Banmauk Township
- Village tract: Kyauktan
- Time zone: UTC+6.30 (MMT)

Le-u (Burmese: လယ်ဦး)is a village in Banmauk Township, Katha District, in the Sagaing Region of northern-central Myanmar. It is part of the Kyauktan village tract.
