= Le-u =

Le-u may refer to several villages in Burma:

- Le-u, Kyauktan village tract, Banmauk Township
- Le-u, Hechein village tract, Banmauk Township
- Le-u, Pinlebu Township
