= Mingon, Man In =

Mingon မင်းကုန်း
- Village
- Location in Myanmar
- Coordinates: 24°42′N 95°40′E
- Country: Myanmar
- Region: Sagaing Region
- District: Katha District
- Township: Banmauk Township
- Village Tract: Man In
- Time zone: UTC+6.30 (MMT)

Mingon (Burmese: မင်းကုန်း) is a village in northern Banmauk Township, Katha District, Sagaing Region in northern Myanmar. It is located about 24 miles (39 km) northwest of Banmauk in the Uyu River basin. It is located within the Man In village tract.
