= Magyigon, Ganan Magyigon =

Magyigon မကျီးကုန်း
- Village
- Location in Myanmar
- Coordinates: 24°21′N 95°24′E
- Country: Myanmar
- Region: Sagaing Region
- District: Katha District
- Township: Banmauk Township
- Village Tract: Ganan Magyigon
- Time zone: UTC+6.30 (MMT)

Magyigon (Burmese: မကျီးကုန်း) is a village in southwestern Banmauk Township, Katha District, Sagaing Region in northern Myanmar. It is located about 18 miles (29 km) north of Pinlebu in the Ganan valley, located on the west bank of a stream. It is located within the Ganan Magyigon village tract.
