= Naungkut, Naungkan =

Naungkut နောင်ကွတ်
- Village
- Location in Myanmar
- Coordinates: 24°32′N 95°33′E
- Country: Myanmar
- Region: Sagaing Region
- District: Katha District
- Township: Banmauk Township
- Village Tract: Naungkan
- Time zone: UTC+6.30 (MMT)

Naungkut (Burmese: နောင်ကွတ်) is a village in western Banmauk Township, Katha District, in the Sagaing Region of northern Myanmar. It is located about 2 miles (3.2 km) northeast of Naungkan in the Uyu River basin. It is located within the Naungkan village tract.
