= Pegon, Lelnetgyi =

Pay Kone ပေကုန်း
- Village
- Location in Myanmar
- Coordinates: 24°23′N 95°50′E
- Country: Myanmar
- Region: Sagaing Region
- District: Katha District
- Township: Banmauk Township
- Village tract: Lelnetgyi
- Time zone: UTC+6.30 (MMT)

Pegon or Pay Kone (Burmese: ပေကုန်း) is a village in eastern Banmauk Township, Katha District, in the Sagaing Region of northern Myanmar, located 2 miles (3.2 km) southwest of Banmauk. It is part of the Lelnetgyi village tract.
