= Alegan =

- Village
- Location in Burma
- Coordinates: 24°19′10″N 95°54′26″E
- Country: Burma
- Region: Sagaing Region
- District: Katha District
- Township: Banmauk Township
- Time zone: UTC+6.30 (MST)

Alegan is a village in Banmauk Township, Katha District, in the Sagaing Region of northern-central Burma, approximately 10 kilometres (6.2 mi) southeast of the township centre of Banmauk.
