= Thaunggyi, Indaw =

Thaunggyi သောင်းကြီး
- Village
- Location in Myanmar
- Coordinates: 24°20′35″N 96°01′27″E
- Country: Myanmar
- Region: Sagaing Region
- District: Kawlin District
- Township: Pinlebu Township
- Village Tract: Man Hton
- Time zone: UTC+6.30 (MMT)

Thaunggyi (Burmese: သောင်ကြီး) is a village in Indaw Township, Kawlin District, Sagaing Region, north-central Myanmar, about 8 miles (13 km) northwest of Indawgyi Lake. It is part of the Man Hton village tract.
