= Thaunggyi =

Thaunggyi is the name of several villages in Myanmar:

- Thaunggyi, Banmauk Township, Sagaing Region
- Thaunggyi, Indaw Township, Sagaing Region
