= Wuntho =

Former Shan state in Burma

Coordinates: 23°53′N 95°40′E

Wuntho Wying Hsö ဝဵင်းသိူဝ်
- ?–1892
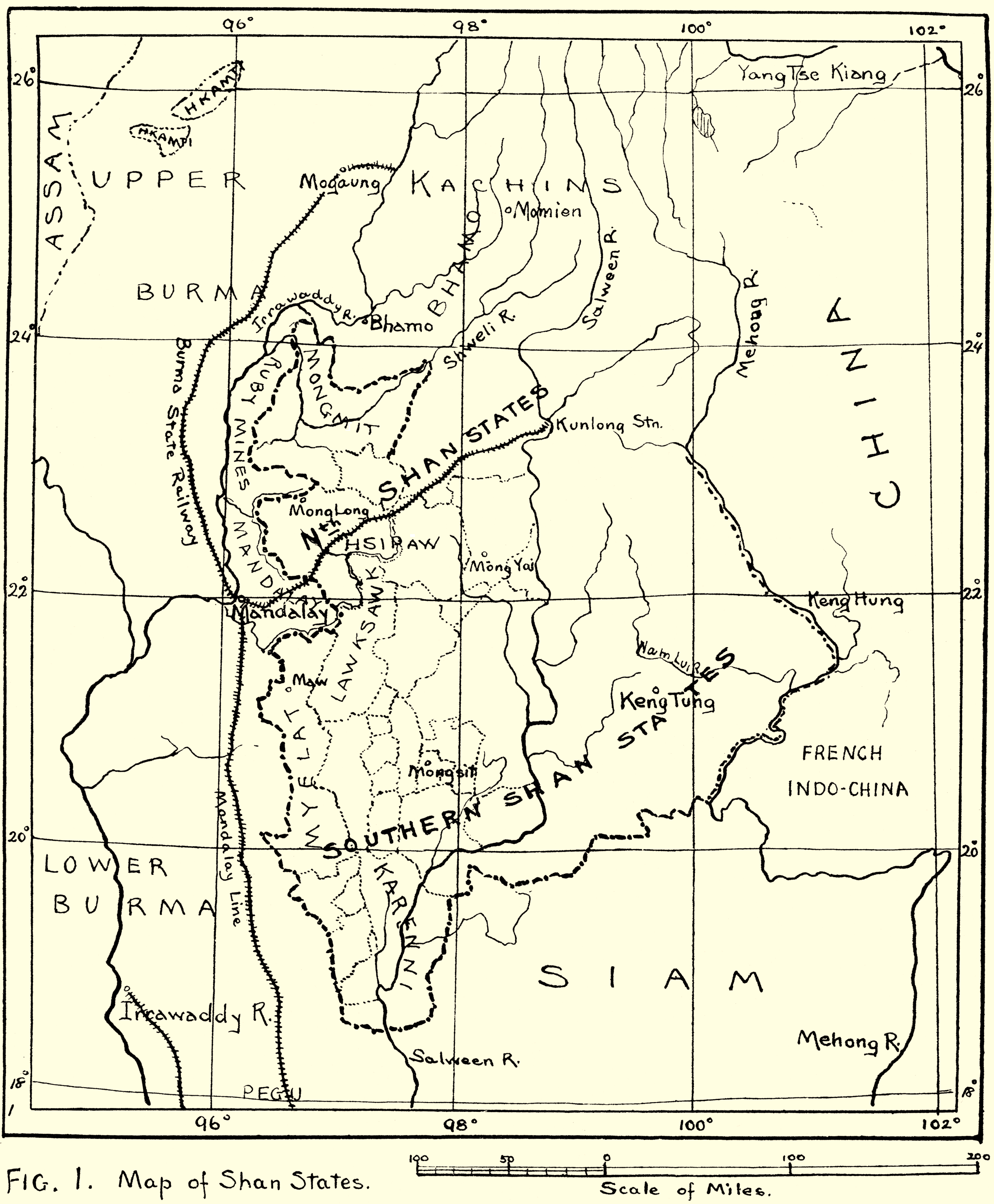
- 1917 map of the Burmese Shan States when Wuntho had already been annexed to the British territories
- Capital: Wuntho
- History
  - Established: ?
  - State merged into Katha District: 1892

Area
- (estimate): 6,200 km^{2} (2,400 sq mi)

Population
  - (estimate): 150,000
Succeeded by
Wuntho Township

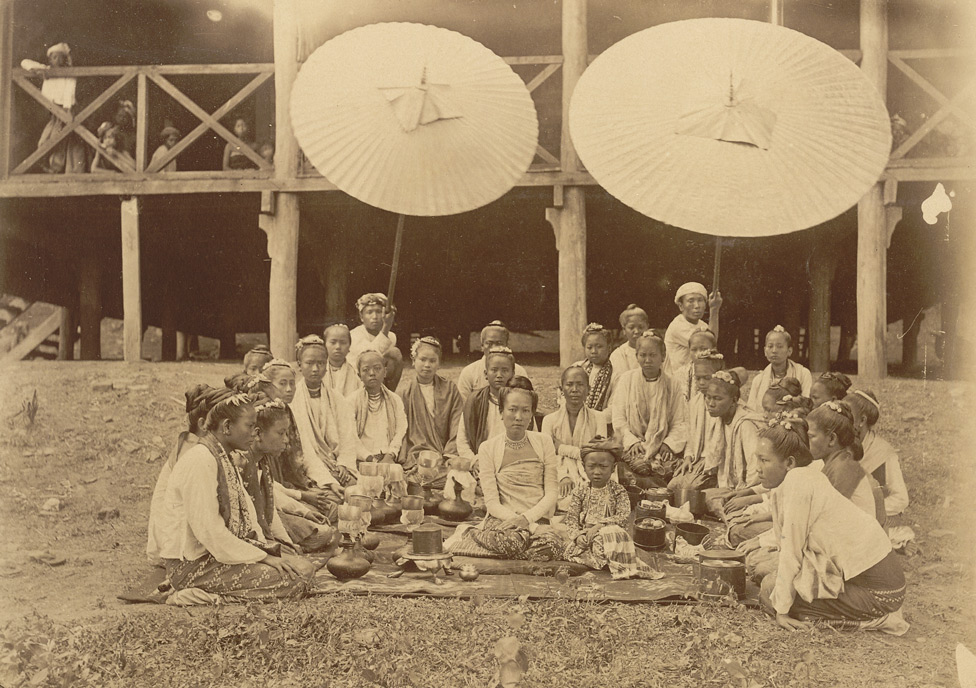
Family of the Saopha of Wuntho.

Wuntho (Burmese: ဝန်းသို), also known as Wying Hsö (Shan: ဝဵင်းသိူဝ်), was a Shan state in Upper Burma. It had an area of around 6,200 square kilometres (2,400 sq mi) with 150,000 inhabitants and lay midway between the Ayeyarwady River and Chindwin Rivers.

== Name ==
The state was at first called Bein-hsö ('town of the tiger') in Shan. This was later changed into Wying Hsö ('city of the tiger'), which was rendered into Burmese as Wuntho (ဝန်းသို). The origin of the name is part of a wider legend which included the founding of the Shan states of Möng Mit, Möng Yang and Möng Kawng.

== History ==
The local history of the Wuntho dates its founding to antiquity with a long list of rulers. James George Scott criticized this as being more patriotic than accurate, and stated that Wuntho may have never been a truly independent Shan State.

In 1555, the governor of Wuntho (a nephew of the Möng Yang saopha) was appointed to resist Bayinnaung's conquest of Upper Burma from Taze.

In 1885 the British annexed Upper Burma and established their rule in the region. Wuntho rebelled in 1891 but the British quelled the uprising. As a consequence a force of 1,800 British soldiers under General Sir George Wolseley occupied the town of Wuntho. In 1892 the state was formally annexed by the British and incorporated into the District of Katha. It was classed by the Burmese as a Shan state, but was never on the same footing as the Shan states to the east.

== Rulers ==
The rulers of Wuntho bore the title Saopha

Saophas:

- 568–588 Hso Than Hpa the son of Hso Tue Hpa the saopha of Hsawng Hsup
- 588–607 Hso Hkoe Hpa son
- 607–623 Hso Waap Hpa son
- 623–645 Hso Weeng Hpa son
- 645–663 Hso Peng Hpa son
- 663–684 Hso Karm Hpa son
- 684–700 Hso Kawt Hpa son
- 700–723 Hso Kert Hpa son
- 723–753 Hso Kyané Hpa son
- 753–769 Hso Ngoen Hpa son
- 769–779 Hso Kyem Hpa son
- 779–799 Hso Pik Hpa son
- 799–806 Hso Lip Hpa son
- 806–836 Hso Hkyeik Hpa son
- 836–850 Hso Wei Hpa son
- 850–867 Hso Kaa Hpa son
- 867–885 Hso Hkeep Hpa son
- 885–904 Hso Kyang Hpa son
- 904–927 Hso Nguen Hpa son
- 927–941 Hso Hki Hpa son
- 941–955 Hso Hkong Hpa son
- 955–967 Hso Pong Hpa son
- 967–1000 Hso Kyeng Hpa son
- 1000–1030 Hso Kyaw Hpa son
- 1030–1075 Hso Haw Hpa son
- 1075–1104 Hso Hkoong Hpa son
- 1104–1128 Hso Houm Hpa son
- 1128–1156 Hso Koong Hpa son
- 1156–1197 Hso Nyue Hpa son
- 1197–1221 Hso Yawn Hpa son
- 1221–1247 Hso Yiab Hpa son
- 1247–1274 Hso Yiam Hpa son
- 1274–1302 Hso Ngan Hpa son
- 1302–1337 Hso Hkam Hpa son
- 1337–1368 Hso Ngam Möng Hpa younger brother
- 1368–1382 Vacant
- 1382–1391 Maung Kiao Hpa (Paung Hkè) nephew
- 1391–1434 Sao Kyi Hpa son
- 1434–1436 Sao Aung Nyo Hpa (Saw Nyi) younger brother
- 1436–1438 Nawng Muen Hpa (Hso Hkaung Hpa) from Nawngmawn
- 1438–1488 Hso Nyen Hpa son
- 1488–1522 Hso Hsa Hpa son
- 1522–1534 Vacant
- 1534–1538 Hso Lung Hpa the ex-saopha of Mongyang State
- 1538–1573 Sao Inn Hkam Hpa son
- 1573–1575 Hso Powt Hpa from Kyawkku Hsiwan (Kyaukku, Myinkyadu)
- 1575–1599 Hso Yap Hpa son
- 1599–1619 Hseng Hkam Hpa (Tein-nyin-sa Saing Hkan) son
- 1619–1646 Aung Nyo Hpa (Thakin Kaw Nyo) son
- 1646–1647 Chow Hnin Mein the Mahadewi of Aung Nyo Hpa
- 1647–1671 Hkam Huea Hpa (Mong Sit Sa, Sit Naing) come from Mongsit
- 1671–1697 Oo Kyaw Hpa (Kyem Möng U Kyaw) son
- 1697–1698 Maung Kyin Baw (the Burmese peer)
- 1698–1703 Maung Sunt (the Burmese peer)
- 1703–1714 Nga Kyin Hpa (Kyaung Pyn Hpa) younger brother of Oo Kyaw Hpa (Kyem Möng U Kyaw)
- 1714–1750 Myat Kaung (Mong Hkoum) son of Oo Kyaw Hpa (Kyem Möng U Kyaw)
- 1750–1756 Vacant
- 1756–1778 Aung Nyo younger brother
- 1778–1796 Maung Tin son
- 1796–1798 Maung Taw San the ex-Pawng Möng of Mye-ne he married with Dewa Ukar the daughter of Hso Hom Hpa the saopha of Kale the Kale population immigrated to Wuntho and settled the villages name Myelin and Taung Kyat
- 1798–1827 Maung Tha Ywe (Hso Hung Hpa) son after his death two sons name Möng Kaeo and Thwin Phyu they usurp the throne but the last the throne controlled by Maung Taw San step-son name Maung Shwe Tha (Sao Hla Hkam)
- 1827–1833 Maung Shwe Tha (Sao Hla Hkam) 1st time the step-son of Maung Tha Ywe (Hso Hung Hpa) he moved to be the saopha of Mongkawng State during 1833–1852
- 1833–1849 Maung Shwe Hti (Hso Hom Hpa) the son of Maung Tha Ywe (Hso Hung Hpa)
- 1849–1852 San Thit the son of Kyam Me Kyaung the peer of Kawlin
- 1852–1878 Maung Shwe Tha (Sao Hla Hkam) 2nd time the step-son of Maung Tha Ywe (Hso Hung Hpa)
- 1878–1878 Hso Hon Hpa son
- 1878– 7 Feb 1891 Maung Aung Shwe Myat (Hso Saw Hpa) son – Last Saopha of Waing Hso (b. 1857 - d.1960)

He led the Wuntho troop to fighting with the British in 1891 but surrendered, after that he escaped to Koshanpye in Santa 13 years and Mong La 19 year until Sir Sao Maung of Yawnghwe State persuaded him to come back to his motherland. After that he lived in Taunggyi and received a salary of 100 kyat per month and when Sao Yawt Hkam Serk was the president of Myanmar he received the salary 500 kyat per month
