= Shwegyaung, Lone Kin Shwegyaung =

Shwegyaung ရွှေကျောင်း
- Village
- Location in Myanmar
- Coordinates: 24°21′N 95°50′E
- Country: Myanmar
- Region: Sagaing Region
- District: Katha District
- Township: Banmauk Township
- Village Tract: Lone Kin Shwegyaung
- Time zone: UTC+6.30 (MMT)

Shwegyaung (Burmese: ရွှေကျောင်း) is a village in eastern Banmauk Township, Katha District, in the Sagaing Region of north-central Myanmar. It is located 3 miles (4.8 km) south of Banmauk. It is part of the Lone Kin Shwegyaung village tract.
