= Khamo =

- Village
- Location in Burma
- Coordinates: 24°25′43″N 95°50′43″E
- Country: Burma
- Region: Sagaing Region
- District: Katha District
- Township: Banmauk Township
- Time zone: UTC+6.30 (MST)

Khamo is a large village in Banmauk Township, Katha District, in the Sagaing Region of northern-central Burma.

== Landmarks ==
The Shwe Banmauk restaurant lies in the western side of the village.
