= Pakaw =

Pakaw may refer to several places in Burma:

- Pakaw, Banmauk
- Pakaw, Hsawlaw
