= Shwegyin =

Shwegyin may refer to:

- Shwegyin (town) in Bago Region, Myanmar
- Shwegyin, Banmauk, Myanmar
- Shwegyin, Kalewa, Myanmar
- Shwegyin Nikaya, a Buddhist order of monks
