= Pegon, Nantat =

Pay Kone
- Village
- Location in Myanmar
- Coordinates: 24°23′N 95°33′E
- Country: Myanmar
- Region: Sagaing Region
- District: Katha District
- Township: Banmauk Township
- Village Tract: Nantat
- Time zone: UTC+6.30 (MMT)

Pegon or Pay Kone (Burmese: ပေကုန်း) is a village in western Banmauk Township, Katha District, in the Sagaing Region of northern Myanmar, located near the headwaters of Nanmaw stream, a tributary of the Mu River. It is part of the Nantat village tract.
