= Hmangin =

Hmangin may refer to several places in Burma:

- Hmangin, Banmauk
- Hmangin, Homalin
