= Naungmo =

Naungmo is the name of several places in Burma:

- Naungmo, Banmauk
- Naungmo, Bhamo
