= Kyundaw =

Kyundaw may refer to several places in Burma:

- Kyundaw, Banmauk
- Kyundaw, Mingin
- Kyundaw, Shwegu
- Kyundaw, Yinmabin
