= Yeshin =

Yeshin may refer to several places in Burma:

- Yeshin, Banmauk
- Yeshin, Kale
