= Anauktaw =

Anauktaw may refer to several places in Burma:

- Anauktaw, Banmauk
- Anauktaw, Budalin
- Anauktaw, Mingin
