= Pandin =

Pandin may refer to several places in Burma:

- Pandin, Banmauk
- Pandin, Shwegu
