= Manyu =

Manyu may refer to:

- Manyu (deity)
- Manyu (department), Cameroon
- Manyu, Banmauk, Burma
- Angra Mainyu
