= Kangyi =

Kangyi may refer to:

== Burma ==
- Kangyi, Banmauk
- Kangyi, Bhamo
- Kangyi, Kale
- Kangyi, Mudon

== China ==
- Kangyi, Wenshang County (康驿镇), town in Wenshang County, Shandong
