= Chaungzon (disambiguation) =

Chaungzon may refer to several places in Burma:

- Chaungzon -a town in Mon State
- Chaungzon, Banmauk in Sagaing Region
- Chaungzon, Homalin in Sagaing Region
- Chaungzon, Kalewa in Sagaing Region
