= Centerville, Elbert County, Georgia =

Unincorporated community in Georgia, U.S.

Coordinates: 34°12′23″N 82°53′30″W

Centerville is an unincorporated community in Elbert County, in the U.S. state of Georgia.

== History ==
The community was so named on account of its relatively central location between Blakely and Mayhaw.
