= Pinlon =

Pinlon may refer to several places in Burma:

- Pinlon, Banmauk
- Pinlon, Kale
- Panglong, Southern Shan State, also known as Pinlon
