= Kyungon, Wuntho =

Kyungon
- Village
- Location in Burma
- Coordinates: 23°56′N 95°39′E
- Country: Burma (Myanmar)
- Region: Sagaing Region
- District: Katha District
- Township: Wuntho Township
- Time zone: UTC+6.30 (MST)

Kyungon is a village in Wuntho Township, Katha District, in the Sagaing Region of northern-central Burma (Myanmar).
