= Kyaiktonda =

- Village
- Location in Burma
- Coordinates: 24°24′N 95°25′E
- Country: Burma
- Region: Sagaing Region
- District: Katha District
- Township: Banmauk Township
- Time zone: UTC+6.30 (MST)

Kyaiktonda is a village in Banmauk Township, Katha District, in the Sagaing Region of northern-central Burma.
