= Tonpin =

Tonpin may refer to several places in Burma:

- Tonpin, Banmauk
- Tonpin, Homalin
