= Kangon, Banmauk =

Kangon
- Village
- Location in Myanmar
- Coordinates: 24.58944°N 95.67088°E
- Country: Myanmar
- Region: Sagaing Region
- District: Katha District
- Township: Banmauk Township
- Village Tract: Man Laung Pay Pin
- Time zone: UTC+6.30 (MMT)

Kangon (Burmese: ကံကုံး) is a village in Banmauk Township, Katha District, in the Sagaing Region, Myanmar. It is located in the village tract of Man Laung Pay Pin, of which Pay Pin is the principal village.
