= Peinnebin, Banmauk =

Peinnebin
- Village
- Location in Burma
- Coordinates: 24°11′N 95°51′E
- Country: Burma
- Region: Sagaing Region
- District: Katha District
- Township: Banmauk Township
- Time zone: UTC+6.30 (MST)

Peinnebin is a village in Banmauk Township, Katha District, in the Sagaing Region of northern-central Burma.
