= Olive Yang =

Burmese drug trafficker (1927–2017)

- Born: 24 June 1927 northern Shan States, British Raj
- Died: 13 July 2017 (aged 90); Muse Township, Shan State, Myanmar
- Other name: Yang Kyin Hsiu (Yang Jinxiu)
- Education: Guardian Angel's Convent School
- Occupation: Warlord
- Known for: Opium trafficking
- Criminal charge: 1962
- Criminal penalty: Prison
- Criminal status: Released (1968)
- Spouse: Twan Sao Wen (1948-1950)
- Children: Duan Jipu (段吉卜)

Olive Yang (Chinese: 楊金秀; pinyin: Yáng Jīnxiù; also known as Yang Kyin Hsiu, nicknamed Miss Hairy Legs) was a prominent opium warlord and the sister of Sao Edward Yang Kyein Tsai, the saopha (chief) of Kokang, a state in post-independent Burma from 1949 to 1959.

== Biography ==
Olive Yang was born during the late British Raj on 24 June 1927 in northern Shan States in British Burma. She received an education at Lashio's Guardian Angel's Convent School. According to her relatives, she defied gender norms at a young age, resisting foot-binding and, in one incident, bringing a gun to her school.

At the age of 19, she organized ethnic Kokang forces, nicknamed the Olive's Boys, an army of over a thousand soldiers and consolidated control of opium trade routes from the highlands to lowlands. She dominated Kokang's opium trade from the end of World War II to the early 1960s. In the 1950s, after the Nationalist defeat and their subsequent expulsion from mainland China, she partnered with the Kuomintang to establish opium trade routes along the Golden Triangle (Southeast Asia).

Her parents arranged a marriage to Twan Sao Wen, the son of Tamaing's chieftain. Her parents had died before her marriage in 1948. From 1948 to 1950, she stayed with Twan and had a son, Duan Jipu (段吉卜), in 1950, as she was expected to produce an heir. Her son is a teacher in Chiang Mai, Thailand. According to her sister, Judy Yang, Twan was afraid of Olive. Olive had allegedly thrown a urine pot when he attempted to consummate the marriage.

From the 1950s to the mid-1960s, she was the commander of the Kokang Ka Kwe Ye(People's Defense Forces). She was a prominent figure in opium trafficking and gold trading. The Burmese government obtained the assistance of Yang and the Kokang Kakweye to force the Kuomintang forces out of Kokang. Yang and the Kokang Kakweye succeeded in 1953, but then collaborated with the Kuomintang in trafficking opium to Thailand throughout the 1950s; the Kuomintang continued to use these opium routes for decades. Her influence increased throughout the decade with the backing of the Kuomintang and Yang became the de facto ruler of the region. She was arrested in 1962, along with her brother Jimmy, a member of parliament in Yangon, by Burmese authorities, to remove them from power and place Kokang territory under Burmese administration. She was imprisoned at Insein Prison and released in 1968.

Yang was known to be either a bisexual or lesbian woman who carried on affairs with film actresses and singers, including Wah Wah Win Shwe (ဝါဝါဝင်းရွှေ) and Miss Burma winner and later KNLA fighter, Louisa Benson Craig. Although she is widely thought to be bisexual, her apparent interest in men may be a false assumption based on Burmese society's understanding of gender non-conformity at the time and her marriage. Many reports and letters from intelligence dispatched to Kokang during her rule often described her as 'manly-hearted.' She was called Uncle Olive by her soldiers but also referred to as a motherly figure. There is insufficient evidence on whether she would have considered herself anything other than a woman.

In the late 1980s, she was recruited by Khin Nyunt to help broker ceasefires in Burma with ethnic rebel groups. After her release, she reportedly spent her final years as a nun. In 2003, after a period of chronic illness, she returned to Kokang, where she lived until her death at the age of 90. She died after a short coma in Muse just outside Kokang, unable to return to Kokang in 2017.
