= Aung Kyaw Myat =

Burmese politician

Deputy minister for Ministry of Science and Technology
- In office 25 July 2013 – 2015

Personal details
- Born: 18 July 1955 (age 71) Katha, Myanmar
- Education: Yangon Technological University

Aung Kyaw Myat (Burmese: အောင်ကျော်မြတ်) is a former deputy Minister of Science and Technology, appointed by President Thein Sein.

== Early life and education ==
Aung Kyaw Myat was born on 18 July 1955 in Katha, Myanmar. He graduated with a degree in civil engineering from Yangon Technological University.

== In office ==
He is also a former Director General of the Department of Advanced Science and Technology. He became deputy minister for the Ministry of Science and Technology on 25 July 2013.
