= Pandin, Banmauk =

Pandin
- Village
- Location in Myanmar
- Coordinates: 24°15′N 95°56′E
- Country: Myanmar
- Region: Sagaing Region
- District: Katha District
- Township: Banmauk Township
- Time zone: UTC+6.30 (MST)

Pandin is a village in Banmauk Township, Katha District, in the Sagaing Region of northern-central Burma.
