= Puzha =

Puzha may refer to these Indian films:

- Puzha (film), a 1980 Malayalam film directed by Jeassy
- Padunna Puzha, a 1968 Malayalam film directed by M. Krishnan Nair

== See also ==
- Pula (disambiguation)
