= Htigyaing Township =

- Township
- Location in Katha district

- Location in Sagaing region

- Location in Burma
- Coordinates: 23°46′0″N 96°8′0″E
- Country: Burma
- Region: Sagaing Region
- District: Katha District
- Capital: Htigyaing
- Time zone: UTC+6.30 (MST)

Htigyaing Township or Tigyaing Township (Burmese: ထီးချိုင့်မြို့နယ်; Shan: ၸႄႈဝဵင်းတီႈၶင်ႉ) is a township of Katha District in eastern Sagaing Region, in northern Myanmar. It lies on the border with the Shan State of Myanmar. The administrative seat is at Htigyaing.

The Shweli River is a tributary of the Irrawaddy and forms part of the northern boundary with Katha Township and part of the eastern boundary with the Shan State. The Indaung Reserved Forest and the Kyauktaung Reserved Forest are located in the eastern part of the township.

Among the towns and villages in Tigyaing Township are: Aledaw, Datwin, Daungbin, Htidawgaing, Myadaung, Tawma and Wundingon.
