= Hmangin, Banmauk =

Hmangin
- Village
- Location in Burma
- Coordinates: 24°11′N 95°54′E
- Country: Burma
- Region: Sagaing Region
- District: Katha District
- Township: Banmauk Township
- Time zone: UTC+6.30 (MST)

Hmangin is a village in Banmauk Township, Katha District, in the Sagaing Region of northern-central Burma.

Type:	Populated place - a city, town, village, or other agglomeration of buildings where people live and work
Mindat.org Region:	Homalin Township, Hkamti District, Sagaing Region, Myanmar
Region:	Homalin, Hkamti District, Sagaing Region, Myanmar
Latitude:	24° 42' 11" N
Longitude:	94° 55' 18" E
Lat/Long (dec):	24.70319,94.92172
Köppen climate type:	Cwa : Monsoon-influenced humid subtropical climate
Mindat Feature ID:	1324412
Long-form Identifier:	mindat:2:6:1324412:7
GUID:	6ba85bae-65fb-44fe-88e6-03cab1fa43a9
