= Louisa Benson Craig =

Burmese rebel leader (1941–2010)

- Born: 10 March 1941; Rangoon, British Burma
- Died: 2 February 2010 (aged 68); Los Angeles, California
- Education: Tufts University; Columbia University
- Known for: Miss Burma
- Spouse(s): Lin Htin (1964-1965); Glenn Craig (1967-)
- Children: 3
- Awards: Miss Burma 1956 (Winner), Miss Burma 1958 (Miss Universe Myanmar 1958) (Winner)

Louisa Charmaine Benson Craig (sometimes spelled Luisa Benson; 10 March 1941 – 2 February 2010) was a Burmese-born two-time beauty pageant winner and Karen rebel leader of Jewish and Karen ancestry.

== Early life and education ==
Louisa Charmaine Benson was born to Saw Benson (also known as Moses Ben-Zion Koder), a Jewish entrepreneur in Rangoon, and his wife Naw Chit Khin, a Karen woman. He was descended on his father's side from the Koder family, a prominent Cochin Jewish business clan in South India's Cochin (now Kochi), and on his mother's side from the Leynado family, a Sephardic Jewish family. Orphaned as a child, Koder was sent to Calcutta to be raised by aunts. He later converted to Christianity. In 1939, after returning to Rangoon, he married.

During World War II, Louisa's parents were separated for lengthy periods as they tried to find safety from the Japanese occupation of Burma. After the war, the independence movement and Karen movement for autonomy resulted in more societal disruption. Louisa went to the United States for college.

Later, she returned to Myanmar where Kokang "war-lady" Olive Yang pursued her romantically but relented when Olive's brother was interested in Louisa. She then returned to Karen State, becoming involved in the Karen National Liberation Army. She left the country for the United States in 1967, after marrying a former classmate and U.S. naval officer Glenn Campbell Craig.

== Marriage and career ==
Benson returned to Karen State and in 1964 married Lin Htin, a commander of the Karen National Liberation Army (KNLA). He died in 1965, and she led the Fifth Brigade. She fell out with the Karen National Union leadership following a power struggle with Bo Mya.

As a "Most Wanted" independence warrior leader, Benson was urged by her people in 1967 to flee Burma to save her life. She emigrated to the United States by marrying Glenn Campbell Craig, a former classmate from her overseas studies at Tufts University. A scion of a Mayflower family, Craig had reconnected with her as a U.S. Naval officer after being assigned to Asian waters near Karen State.

After emigrating, Louisa Benson Craig earned a master's degree in international affairs at Columbia University. She worked as an advocate for Burmese democracy and for resettlement of Burmese refugees in the United States. In 2004, she was named a plaintiff in a landmark human rights case against Unocal for profiting from the Burmese military's alleged human rights abuses by operating the Yadana gas field.

Louisa had three children with Glenn Craig. After his naval career, he became an entrepreneur, helping found an international school publications enterprise based in California.

Louisa's daughter, Charmaine Craig, wrote the novel "Miss Burma," which was published in 2017. The novel is said to be "based on the remarkable lives of the author's mother and grandparents."
