= Pula (surname) =

Pula is a surname. Notable people with the surname include:

- Gazmend Pula, Kosovar-Albanian intellectual, human rights campaigner, and is Kosovar ambassador to Albania
- James S. Pula (born 1946), award-winning Polish-American historian, professor, author, and Polonia activist
- Robert P. Pula (1929–2004), director emeritus of the Institute of General Semantics, author, and composer

== See also ==
- Pula (disambiguation)
