= Wuntho, Myanmar =

Wuntho ဝန္းသို
- Town
- Location in Burma
- Coordinates: 23°53′59″N 95°40′49″E
- Country: Myanmar
- Region: Sagaing Region
- District: Kawlin District
- Township: Wuntho Township
- Time zone: UTC+6.30 (MMT)

Wuntho (Shan: ဝဵင်းသိူဝ်) is a town in Kawlin District, Sagaing Region, Myanmar. It is the administrative seat of Wuntho Township.

== History ==
While not the capital, it gave its name to the native state of Wuntho which was formally annexed to Burma by the British in 1892. Rail service from Mandalay was extended to Wuntho in 1893.

On 30 December 1994, on the outskirts of Wuntho on the Bonkyaung bridge a Mandalay-Myitkyina passenger train derailed when its brakes failed and one passenger car plummeted into a ravine. In all, 102 people were killed and 53 were seriously injured.
