= Mayhaw, Georgia =

Unincorporated community in Georgia, U.S.

Coordinates: 31°10′36″N 84°52′31″W

Mayhaw is an unincorporated community in Miller County, in the U.S. state of Georgia.

== History ==
A post office called Mayhaw was established in 1888, and remained in operation until 1907. The community was named for the abundance of mahaw trees near the original town site.
