= Kyungôn =

Kyungôn Kyungon
- Village
- Location in Burma
- Coordinates: 16°56′41″N 94°41′58″E
- Country: Burma (Myanmar)
- Region: Ayeyarwady Region
- District: Pathein
- Township: Pathein
- Time zone: UTC+6.30 (MST)

Kyungôn is a village in Pathein Township, Pathein District, in the Ayeyarwady Region of northern-central Myanmar. It lies beside a former oxbow lake of the Pathein River west of the river at the edge of the flood plain. The oxbow lake has been converted to paddy.
