= Sao Edward Yang Kyein Tsai =

Saopha of Kokang from 1949 to 1959

Sao Edward Yang Kyein Tsai OBE
- 楊振材
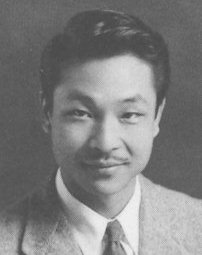

Saopha of Kokang
- In office 1949 – 17 May 1959
- Preceded by: Yang Wen Pin
- Succeeded by: Position abolished

Personal details
- Born: Yang Kyein Tsai (楊振材); 1918 Yamen, Kya Diling, Kokang, British Burma
- Died: 1971 (aged 52–53) Lashio, Shan State, Burma
- Relations: Jimmy Yang Kyein Sein (younger brother); Olive Yang (younger sister)
- Education: Rangoon University

Sao Edward Yang Kyein Sai OBE (Chinese: 楊振材; pinyin: Yáng Zhèncái, Burmese: စောယန်းကျိန်စိုင်း, 1918–1971) was the last traditional ruler (saopha) of the Chiefdom of Kokang from 1949, upon the death of his father, saopha Sao Yang Wen Pin, until he abdicated in 1959.

Yang's sister, Olive Yang, was a prominent opium warlord, recruited by Khin Nyunt in the late 1980s to help broker ceasefires in Burma with ethnic rebel groups.
