= Möng Sit =

Former Shan State in Burma

Coordinates: 20°33′N 98°37′E

Möng Sit မိုင်းစိတ်နယ်
- State of the Shan States
- 17th century–1959
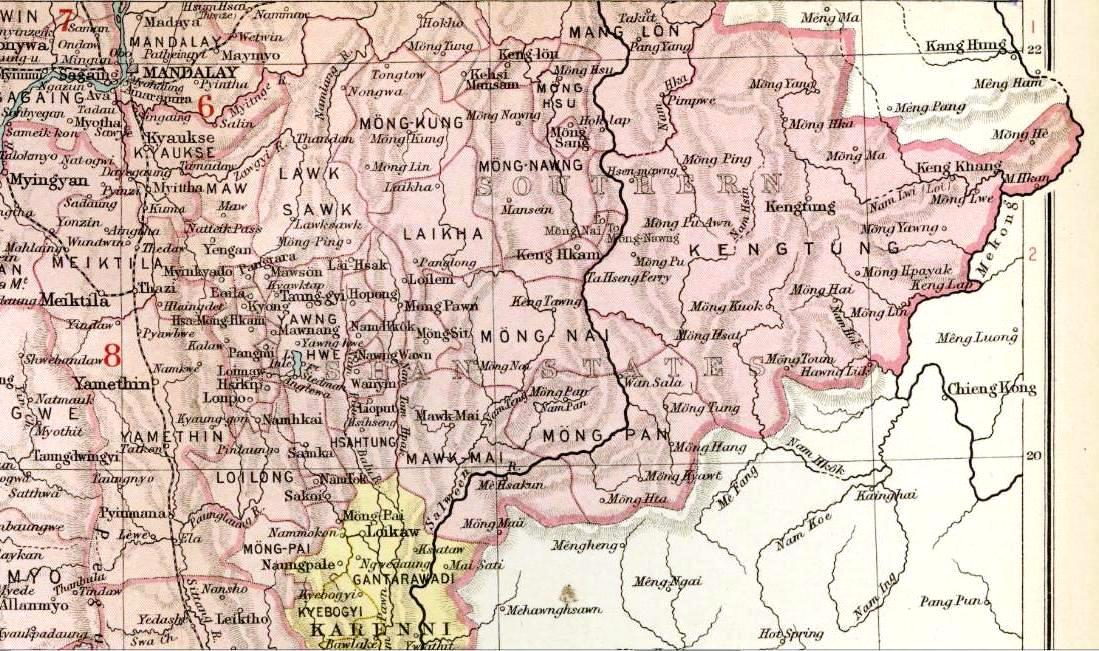
- Möng Sit in an Imperial Gazetteer of India map
- Capital: Möng Sit
- Area
  - 1901: 784.76 km^{2} (303.00 sq mi)
- Population
  - 1901: 9,013
- History
  - State founded: 17th century
  - Abdication of the last Myoza: 1959
Preceded by	Succeeded by
Hsenwi	Shan State

Möng Sit, also known as Maingseik (Burmese: မိုင်းစိတ်) was small state of the Shan States in what is today Burma.

== History ==
The capital and residence of the Myoza was Möng Sit town, located in the northern part of the state and with 1,223 inhabitants according to the 1901 Census of India. The northern half of Mongsit was irrigated by the Nam Teng and the southern by the Nam Pawn.

=== Rulers ===
The rulers of Möng Sit bore the title of Myoza.

==== Myozas ====
The list of rulers of Möng Sit:

- 1816 - 18.. ....
- 18.. - 1857 Sao Haw Pik
- 1857 - 18.. Hkun Kyaw San
- 18.. - 1873 Hkun Lu
- 1873 - 1876 Nang Li (f)
- 1873 - 1876 Hkam Yi -Regent (1st time)
- 1876 - 1880 Sao Leng Leong
- 1880 - 1883 Hkam Yi -Regent (2nd time)
- 1883 - .... Hkam Pwin (b. 1861 - d. ....)
