= Pula language =

Pula may refer to:

- Phola language
- Tadyawan language
- Blang language
