= Chiefdom of Kokang =

Autonomous Tusi chiefdom in modern-day Myanmar

Chiefdom of Kokang 果敢土司
- 1739–1959
- Capital: Kya Tzi Shu (in modern Kokang)
- Common languages: Southwestern Mandarin
- Government: Monarchy
- Saopha
  - 1739–1758: Yang Shien-tsai (first)
  - 1947–1949: Sao Yang Wen Pin
  - 1949–1959: Sao Edward Yang Kyein Tsai (last)
- History
  - Established: 1739
  - Disestablished: 1959
Preceded by	Succeeded by
Hsenwi State	Myanmar
- Today part of: Myanmar

The Chiefdom of Kokang (Chinese: 果敢土司; pinyin: Guǒgǎn Tǔsī), was a chiefdom in modern-day Kokang, Shan State, Myanmar ruled by the Han Chinese Yang Clan. The Yang Clan were Ming Empire loyalists that moved to Kokang with other Ming loyalists. Yang Gaoxue was one such loyalists whose descendant, Yang Shien-tsai formed the Chiefdom of Kokang officially on 1739. When the Qing dynasty rose to power in China, the Chiefdom of Kokang decided to acknowledge Qing suzerainty in order to prevent an invasion by the Qing regime. The region was ceded to the British Raj in 1894 after the British defeated the Qing, and the British started chipping away its autonomous status.

== History ==
The kingdom was officially founded by Yang Shien-tsai (楊獻才/杨献才, Yáng Xiàncái); who began his reign in 1739 in and around Ta Shwe Htan, then called Xingdahu (興達戶/兴达户, Xīng Dáhù), and took the title "Chief of Xingdahu". He was succeeded upon his death in 1758 by his son Yang Weixing (楊維興/杨维兴), later referred to as Chief of Kho Kan Shan (科干山, Kēgàn Shān).

He expanded his territory tenfold compared to that inherited from his predecessor. After his death in 1795, his son Yang You Gen (楊有根/杨有根, Yáng Yǒugēn) became the chief. He soon renamed the state as Kokang and titled himself Heng of Kokang.

In 1840, Yang Guohua (楊國華) was given the title "the Hereditable Magistrate of Guogan (Kokang) County (世襲果敢縣令)" by the Chinese government.

The Heng was succeeded after his death in 1874 by his younger brother Yang Guozheng (楊國正/杨国正), who ruled peacefully and began relations with British Raj colonists upon the British occupation]of Upper Burma. In 1916 he went blind, and abdicated in favor of his nephew Yang Chunrong (楊春榮/杨春荣, Yáng Chūnróng). The new ruler then took the Burmese title "Myosa" (lit. town eat, given to a prince). He died in 1927 and was succeeded by his son Colonel Sao Yang Wen Ping (楊文炳/杨文炳, Yáng Wénbǐng), Saopha of Kokang.

== Rulers ==
- 1739–1758: Yang Shien Tsai (Cai) (b. 1685 – d. 1758)
- 1758–1795: Yang Wei Shin (Xing) (d. 1795)

=== Title Heng ===
After China relinquished its claims on 4 February 1897, Kokang came under British Raj protection.

- 1795–1840: Yang Yon Gen (b. 1770 – d. 1840)
- 1840–1874: Yang Guo Hwa (b. 1814 – d. 1874)
- 1874–1916: Yang Guo Zhen (Hkun Lu Kwan) (b. 1840 – d. 1919

=== Title Myosa ===
- 1916–17 Jan 1927: Yang Chun Yon (Yang Shwin Yong Tzu Ye) (b. 1878 – d. 1927)
- 17 Jan 1927–1943: Sao Yang Wen Pin (1st term) (b. 1897 – d. 1949) (deposed by the Kuomintang in 1943; in exile from 1944 until Oct 1945)
- Oct 1945–25 Aug 1947: Sao Yang Wen Pin (2nd term)

=== Title Saopha ===
Kokang was recognized as separate from Shan State in August 1947 by the British, and the ruler took the title Saopha. He died in 1949 and was succeeded by his son Sao Edward Yang Kyein Tsai (楊振材/杨振材, Yáng Zhèncái) who was deposed by the Burmese in 1959. Before that it is part Hsenwi Saopha territory.

- 25 Aug 1947–1949: Sao Yang Wen Pin OBE
- 1949–17 May 1959: Sao Edward Yang Kyein Tsai (b. 1918 – d. 1971)
