= Kyungon, Danubyu =

Kyungon
- Village
- Location in Burma
- Coordinates: 17°33′N 95°28′E
- Country: Burma (Myanmar)
- Region: Ayeyarwady Region
- District: Maubin District
- Township: Danubyu Township
- Time zone: UTC+6.30 (MST)

Kyungon is a village in Danubyu Township, Maubin District, in the Ayeyarwady Region of northern-central Myanmar.
