= Lemi (name) =

Lemi may refer to the following people:

Given name

- Lemi Berhanu Hayle (born 1994), Ethiopian long-distance runner
- Lemi Ghariokwu (born 1955), Nigerian artist, illustrator and designer
- Lemi Ponifasio, Samoan and New Zealand director, artist, dancer, designer and choreographer

Surname

- David Lemi (born 1982), Samoan rugby player
- Teddese Lemi (born 1999), Ethiopian middle-distance runner
