= Banmauk Township =

- Township
- Location in Katha district

- Location in Sagaing region

- Location in Burma
- Coordinates: 24°24′N 95°51′E
- Country: Myanmar
- Region: Sagaing Region
- District: Katha District
- Capital: Banmauk
- Time zone: UTC+6.30 (MST)

Banmauk Township is a township in Katha District in the Sagaing Region of Myanmar. The principal town is Banmauk.

== Towns and villages ==
- Alegan
- Anauktaw
- Banmauk
- Budaung
- Chaungbya
- Chaungzon
- Dayu
- Gaunggaik
- Hawyaw
- Hechein
- Hmangin
- Hmawbon
- Htandaw
- Hteinson
- Htidawgaing
- Hwemaukkan
- Hwesokchi
- Inbauk
- Inbin
- Kalat
- Kandaw
- Kangon
- Kangon
- Kangon
- Kangon
- Kangyi
- Kanni
- Kanthaya
- Kazaukpa
- Kezin
- Khamo
- Khaungton
- Khopyin
- Kyaiktonda
- Kyainggyi
- Kyakat
- Kyauk-aing
- Kyauktan
- Kyaungle
- Kyikazet
- Kyundaw
- Kyungon
- Kywegawgyi
- Legyin
- Leiksaw
- Lemi
- Letpan
- Letpangyin
- Le-u
- Le-u
- Lwegyaung
- Lwin-u
- Magyigon
- Magyigon
- Magyigon
- Magyigon
- Mahaw
- Mangon
- Manhton
- Mankat
- Manna
- Mansein
- Mansi
- Mantun
- Manyu
- Mingon
- Mingon
- Mode
- Mutha
- Mutthein
- Mwe-te
- Nakha
- Namakauk
- Namalut
- Namdaw
- Namhedaung
- Namhkin
- Namkasa
- Nasinkut
- Natmogaung-aleywa
- Natonna
- Naunghmi
- Naungkan
- Naungkut
- Naungkut
- Naunglon
- Naungmalin
- Naungmelon
- Naungmo
- Naungpat
- Nyaungchedauk
- Onhmin
- Pakaw
- Pamon
- Pandaw
- Pandin
- Payindaung
- Pegon
- Pegon
- Peinnebin
- Peta
- Pinbon
- Pinkha
- Pinlon
- Pinmana
- Pula
- Sakhan
- Segyi
- Settaw
- Se-u
- Shwegyaung
- Shwegyaung
- Shwegyaung
- Shwegyin
- Shwehnit
- Simaw
- Sinchidaing
- Sondaw
- Takye
- Tamaing
- Tamakyaing
- Taungchiyin
- Taunggon
- Taungle
- Taunglwe
- Taungyagon
- Tenpadit
- Thangyaw-in
- Thaunggyi
- Thaunggyi
- Thayagon
- Thayagon
- Thayetkon
- Thayetkon
- Thayetkon
- Thinganda
- Tonbok
- Tonbon
- Tongyaung
- Tonkaw
- Tonmun
- Tonpin
- Yeshin
- Ywathitkon
