= Kyungon, Kanbalu =

Kyungon
- Village
- Location in Burma
- Coordinates: 23°41′N 95°42′E
- Country: Burma (Myanmar)
- Region: Sagaing Region
- District: Shwebo District
- Township: Kanbalu Township
- Time zone: UTC+6.30 (MST)

Kyungon is a village in Kanbalu Township, Shwebo District, in the Sagaing Region of northern-central Myanmar.
