= George Wolseley =

Anglo-Irish military officer (1839–1921)

Lieutenant-General Sir George Wolseley
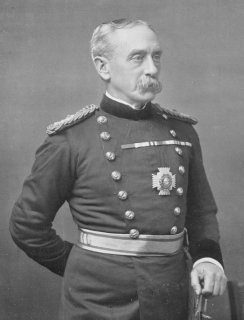
- Sir George Wolseley
- Born: 11 July 1839; Dublin, Ireland
- Died: 10 May 1921 (aged 81); Near Wateringbury, Kent, England
- Military career
- Allegiance: United Kingdom
- Branch: Indian Army
- Rank: Lieutenant-General
- Commands: Madras Command
- Conflicts: Indian Mutiny; Anglo-Egyptian War; Mahdist War
- Awards: Knight Grand Cross of the Order of the Bath

Lieutenant-General Sir George Benjamin Wolseley GCB (11 July 1839 – 10 May 1921) was an Anglo-Irish officer in the Indian Army.

== Military career ==
Wolseley was the third surviving son of Major Garnet Joseph Wolseley, of the 90th Regiment of Foot (Perthshire Volunteers), by his wife Frances Anne Smith (daughter of William Smith, County Dublin). He was the younger brother of Field Marshal Lord Wolseley and inventor Frederick Wolseley. Wolseley's paternal grandfather was Rev. William Wolseley, Rector of Tullycorbet, and the third son of Sir Richard Wolseley, 1st Baronet, who sat in the Irish House of Commons for Carlow. The family seat was Mount Wolseley in County Carlow.

His father died in 1840, leaving a widow and seven children to survive on his Army pension. Money was short, leaving the Wolseley sons to be educated at the local school instead of being sent to England as was typical for boys of their class. He was commissioned into the 84th Regiment of Foot in 1857 and saw active service in the response to the Indian Mutiny. He became Assistant Adjutant-General with the Candahar Field Force in 1878, Assistant Adjutant-General in Egypt in 1882 (seeing action again at the Battle of Tel el-Kebir in September of that year) and Assistant Adjutant-General in the Nile Expedition of 1884. He became commander of a brigade in Burma in 1889 (which secured the town of Wuntho in 1891) and General Officer Commanding the Lahore District in India in March 1895. He went on to be General Officer Commanding the forces in the Punjab in 1897 and Commander-in-Chief Madras Command in 1898. He served as such for five years until October 1903, but had an extended leave back home in 1902 after his wife's death. He was promoted to full general in May 1906.

== Family ==
Wolseley married, in 1867, Esther Louise Andrews, daughter of William Andrews. They had one son who died young. Lady Wolseley died at Hillside, Whitechurch, Oxfordshire, on 11 March 1902.

== Death ==
On 10 May 1921, Wolseley's body was discovered on the train tracks of the South Eastern and Chatham Railway (now Medway Valley line) between Wateringbury and Teston in Kent. At the time of his death, he was a resident of Thatched House, Wateringbury. His death was reported as an accident.

Military offices
Preceded by Sir Charles Clarke	C-in-C, Madras Command; 1898–1903	Succeeded by Sir Charles Egerton
