= Kawlin Township =

Kawlin Township ၸႄႈဝဵင်းၵေႃလၢင်း
- Township
- Location in Kawlin district

- Location in Sagaing region

- Location in Myanmar
- Coordinates: 23°47′N 95°41′E
- Country: Myanmar
- Region: Sagaing Region
- District: Kawlin District
- Capital: Kawlin

Area
  - Township: 1,891.18 km^{2} (730.19 sq mi)
  - Urban: 2.75 km^{2} (1.06 sq mi)
  - Rural: 1,888.44 km^{2} (729.13 sq mi)

Population (2019)
  - Township: 151,959
  - Density: 80.3514/km^{2} (208.109/sq mi)
  - Urban: 25,254
  - Rural: 126,705
- Time zone: UTC+6.30 (MST)

Kawlin Township (Shan: ၸႄႈဝဵင်းၵေႃလၢင်း) is a township in Kawlin District (formerly part of Katha District) in the Sagaing Division of Burma. The principal town is Kawlin.

== Administrative divisions ==
Kawlin Township is divided into eight wards. The rural villages, of which there are 202, are grouped into forty-six "village groups" (ကျေးရွာအုပ်စုအရေအတွက်).
