= Pinlebu Township =

- Township
- Location in Kawlin district

- Location in Sagaing region
- Coordinates: 24°05′N 95°22′E
- Country: Burma
- Region: Sagaing Region
- District: Kawlin District
- Capital: Pinlebu
- Time zone: UTC+6.30 (MST)

Pinlebu Township is a township in Kawlin District (formerly part of Katha District) in the Sagaing Division of Burma. The principal town is Pinlebu.
