= Wuntho Township =

- Township
- Location in Kawlin district

- Location in Sagaing region

- Location in Myanmar
- Coordinates: 23°54′N 95°41′E
- Country: Myanmar
- Region: Sagaing Region
- District: Kawlin District
- Capital: Wuntho
- Time zone: UTC+6.30 (MST)

Wuntho Township is a township in Kawlin District (formerly part of Katha District) in the Sagaing Region of Myanmar. The principal town is Wuntho.

== History ==
Wuntho was a native state of Upper Burma when Burma was under British control. After the British annexed Upper Burma in 1885, Wuntho became a refuge for rebels and whom the British called bandits until in 1891, when a force of 1,800 British soldiers under General Sir George Wolseley occupied the town of Wuntho. In 1892 the state was formally annexed by the British and incorporated into the District of Katha. It was classed by the Burmese as a Shan state, but was never on the same footing as the Shan states to the east.

Wuntho had an area of around 2,400 square miles (6,200 km^{2}) with 150,000 inhabitants and lay midway between the Ayeyarwady River and Chindwin River.
