= Pinlebu =

Pinlebu ပင်လယ်ဘူး
- Town
- Location in Myanmar
- Coordinates: 24°04′53″N 95°22′13″E
- Country: Myanmar
- Region: Sagaing Region
- District: Kawlin District
- Township: Pinlebu Township
- Elevation: 266 m (873 ft)
- Time zone: UTC+6.30 (MST)

Pinlebu (Burmese: ပင်လယ်ဘူး; Shan: ပၢင်ၵႆႇၽူႈ) is a town in Kawlin District, north-central Sagaing Region of Myanmar on the Mu River. It is the administrative seat of Pinlebu Township. The town is connected by road to Phaungbyin, Kawlin, and Bamauk. Its inhabitants include the Kadu and Kanan ethnic minorities, and the region has witnessed fighting between the Communists and the government troops. On the 8th of October 2024, the town was captured by anti-military junta forces.

== Etymology ==
Pinlebu is derived from the Shan language name Pinkapu or Pang Kai Hpo (Shan: ပၢင်ၵႆႇၽူႈ), meaning "cock-clearing".

== Climate ==
Climate data for Pinlebu (1981−2010)
Month	Jan	Feb	Mar	Apr	May	Jun	Jul	Aug	Sep	Oct	Nov	Dec	Year
Mean daily maximum °C (°F)	24.9 (76.8)	28.5 (83.3)	32.9 (91.2)	35.5 (95.9)	34.6 (94.3)	32.7 (90.9)	32.1 (89.8)	31.6 (88.9)	31.6 (88.9)	30.8 (87.4)	27.6 (81.7)	24.9 (76.8)	30.6 (87.2)
Mean daily minimum °C (°F)	9.2 (48.6)	11.2 (52.2)	14.1 (57.4)	18.1 (64.6)	20.9 (69.6)	22.4 (72.3)	22.4 (72.3)	22.5 (72.5)	21.3 (70.3)	19.4 (66.9)	14.7 (58.5)	9.9 (49.8)	17.2 (62.9)
Average precipitation mm (inches)	2.0 (0.08)	9.7 (0.38)	15.5 (0.61)	45.9 (1.81)	181.7 (7.15)	275.0 (10.83)	241.9 (9.52)	235.2 (9.26)	275.8 (10.86)	186.8 (7.35)	23.9 (0.94)	6.4 (0.25)	1,499.8 (59.04)
Source: Norwegian Meteorological Institute
