= Kawlin District =

Katha District ကောလင်းခရိုင်
- District
- Country: Myanmar
- Region: Sagaing Region
- No. of Townships: 3
- Capital: Kawlin
- Time zone: UTC+6.30 (MMT)

Kawlin District (Burmese: ကောလင်းခရိုင်) is a district in Sagaing Region, Myanmar. On 5 December 2018, three townships in Katha District were separated and formed as Kawlin District. The principal town is Kawlin.

== Townships ==
Townships of Kawlin district

Kawlin
Wuntho
Pinlebu

Kawlin District consists of the following three townships.

- Kawlin Township
- Wuntho Township
- Pinlebu Township
