= Indaw Township =

- Township
- Location in Katha district

- Location in Sagaing region

- Location in Myanmar
- Coordinates: 24°13′N 96°08′E
- Country: Myanmar
- Region: Sagaing Region
- District: Katha District
- Capital: Indaw

Area
  - Total: 733.021 sq mi (1,898.52 km^{2})

Population (2019)
  - Total: 126,330
  - Density: 172.34/sq mi (66.541/km^{2})
  - Ethnicities: Bamar; Shan; Kachin
  - Religions: Buddhism
- Time zone: UTC+6.30 (MMT)

Indaw Township is a township in Katha District in the Sagaing Division, Myanmar. The principal town is Indaw. The township is divided into 2 towns, totalling 10 urban wards, as well as 148 villages grouped into 40 village tracts. The township borders Kachin State to the north.
