= Katha, Myanmar =

Katha ကသာ (ၵၢတ်ႇသႃႇ) Kathar
- Town
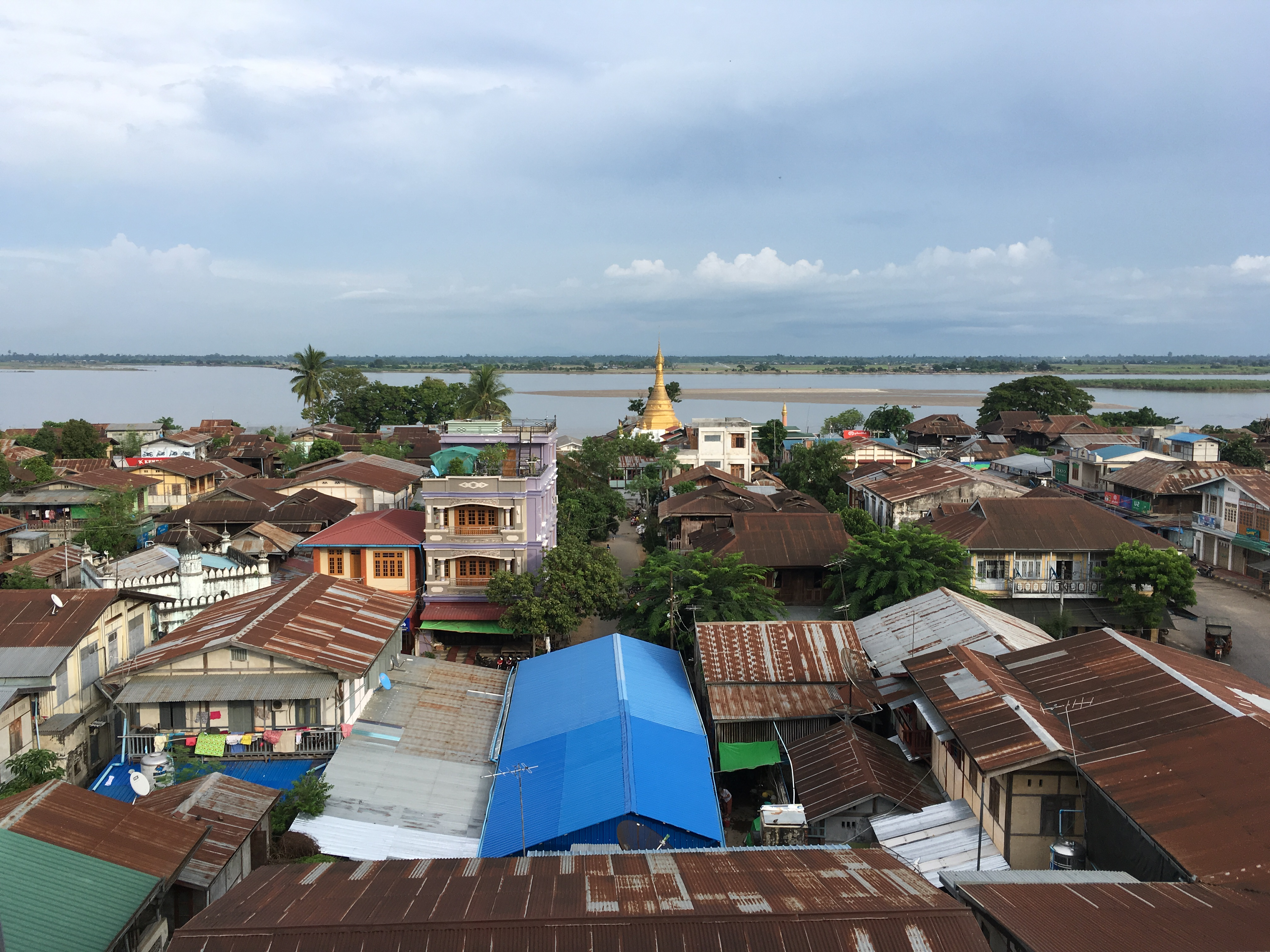
- View of the town towards the river

- Location of Katha, Burma
- Coordinates: 24°10′56″N 96°19′50″E
- Country: Myanmar
- Division: Sagaing Region
- District: Katha
- Township: Katha
- Elevation: 407 ft (124 m)

Population (2014)
  - Total: 167,700
- Time zone: UTC+6.30 (MST)

Katha (Burmese: ကသာ, MLCTS: ka. sa, IPA: [ka̰θà]; Shan: ၵၢတ်ႇသႃႇ), sometimes also spelled Kathar, is a town in Sagaing Region, Myanmar (Burma), on the west side of the Irrawaddy River on a bluff with an average elevation of 124 m (407 ft). Most of the town is more than 10 m (33 ft) above the river. Katha is known for having inspired Kyauktada, the fictional setting of George Orwell's Burmese Days.

== Etymology ==
According to the historian Than Tun, "Katha" is a Shan-origin name meaning "Mulberry Market".

James George Scott noted in 1900 that local etymologists believed that "Katha" came from the Kachin name "Kasa", meaning a "place of festival", but he criticizes this theory stating that "it is practically certain that it was called Katha before there were any Kachins in the neighbourhood".

== Location ==
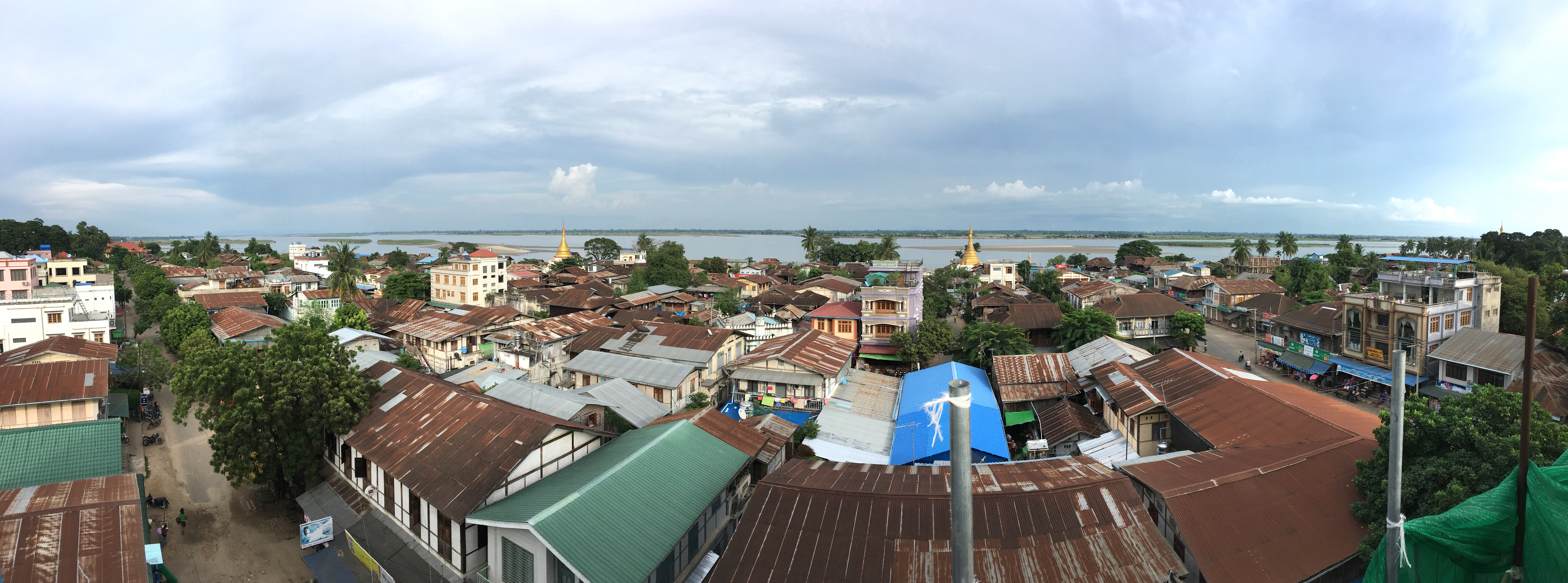
Panoramic View of Katha 2016

Katha is 12 hours by rail north of Mandalay through the railroad junction town of Naba which is 23 km (14 mi) to the west of Katha. A small branch of railway runs east from Naba to Katha. Katha can also be reached by ferries that run on the Irrawaddy River between the upstream town of Bhamo down to Mandalay. There is also direct bus service from Mandalay to Katha, but it is a bumpy ride.

== Climate ==
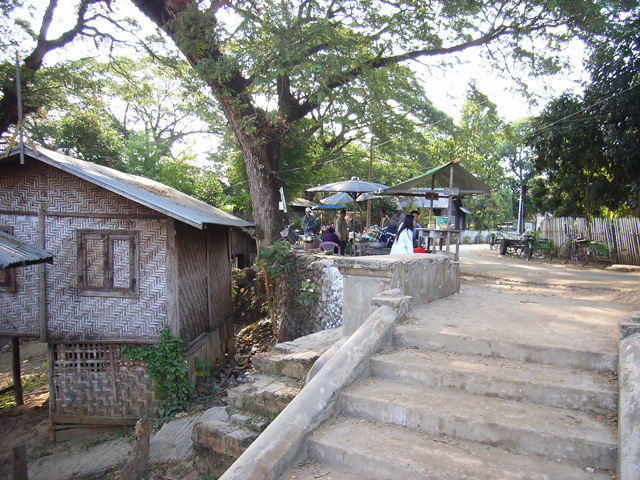
Street in Katha along the Irrawaddy River

Katha has a tropical savanna climate (Köppen climate classification Aw) bordering on a humid subtropical climate (Köppen Cwa). Temperatures are very warm to hot throughout the year, with milder winter months (December–February). There is a winter dry season (November–March) and a summer wet season (April–October).

Climate data for Katha (1991–2020)
Month	Jan	Feb	Mar	Apr	May	Jun	Jul	Aug	Sep	Oct	Nov	Dec	Year
Record high °C (°F)	32.5 (90.5)	36.6 (97.9)	40.2 (104.4)	40.6 (105.1)	41.9 (107.4)	42.1 (107.8)	36.5 (97.7)	37.5 (99.5)	38.2 (100.8)	38.8 (101.8)	34.9 (94.8)	31.7 (89.1)	42.1 (107.8)
Mean daily maximum °C (°F)	27.6 (81.7)	30.2 (86.4)	33.2 (91.8)	34.9 (94.8)	34.0 (93.2)	32.7 (90.9)	31.9 (89.4)	31.9 (89.4)	32.1 (89.8)	31.5 (88.7)	30.2 (86.4)	27.9 (82.2)	31.5 (88.7)
Daily mean °C (°F)	19.0 (66.2)	21.4 (70.5)	24.5 (76.1)	27.1 (80.8)	28.0 (82.4)	28.1 (82.6)	27.8 (82.0)	27.8 (82.0)	27.4 (81.3)	26.1 (79.0)	23.1 (73.6)	19.7 (67.5)	25 (77)
Mean daily minimum °C (°F)	10.4 (50.7)	12.6 (54.7)	15.9 (60.6)	19.4 (66.9)	21.9 (71.4)	23.5 (74.3)	23.7 (74.7)	23.6 (74.5)	22.8 (73.0)	20.7 (69.3)	15.9 (60.6)	11.5 (52.7)	18.5 (65.3)
Record low °C (°F)	3.5 (38.3)	4.2 (39.6)	8.3 (46.9)	10.8 (51.4)	13.0 (55.4)	15.3 (59.5)	16.5 (61.7)	15.5 (59.9)	15.0 (59.0)	12.0 (53.6)	7.5 (45.5)	2.8 (37.0)	2.8 (37.0)
Average precipitation mm (inches)	9.5 (0.37)	12.7 (0.50)	10.9 (0.43)	48.2 (1.90)	210.4 (8.28)	312.8 (12.31)	256.4 (10.09)	252.0 (9.92)	236.9 (9.33)	158.2 (6.23)	26.8 (1.06)	5.6 (0.22)	1,540.4 (60.65)
Average precipitation days (≥ 1.0 mm)	1.3	1.5	2.2	5.9	12.3	15.2	14.9	15.7	13.4	10.2	2.7	0.8	96.1
Source 1: World Meteorological Organization
Source 2: Norwegian Meteorological Institute (extremes)

== Economy ==
Katha is the administrative seat of Katha District which comprises seven small townships. Katha is populated with government offices and many of the early town settlers were from every part of Burma and usually had background history of civil service under at least one ministerial department. The main economy of the town is fishing and farming of kidney beans. Production of rice in the Katha Township is less than its consumption and Katha has to depend on imports from the nearby townships such as Indaw or Kawlin.

== Setting of George Orwell's Burmese Days ==
Katha is known in literature as the real place underlying the fictional Kyauktada, the setting of George Orwell's first novel Burmese Days (1934). Orwell himself served at Katha in 1926–27 in the Indian Imperial Police. The British Club (including active tennis court), police station, and town jail are locations mentioned in the novel that can still be visited today. More accounts on this section are readable in Emma Larkin's "Finding George Orwell in Burma". Katha has links with prominent Burmese writers such as Shwe U Daung, Thaw Tar Swe, Theik-Pan Muu Tin, and AFPFL leader Kyaw Nyein.

In September 2019, the Katha Heritage Trust opened a museum at the house that Orwell lived in during his time in Katha. The two-story wooden building had been an attraction for Western tourists. The museum features portraits and a picture of Orwell, and a painting of the house. One stated aim of the trust was to cooperate with the Orwell Trust in the United Kingdom to restore momentos of Orwell's time in Katha.

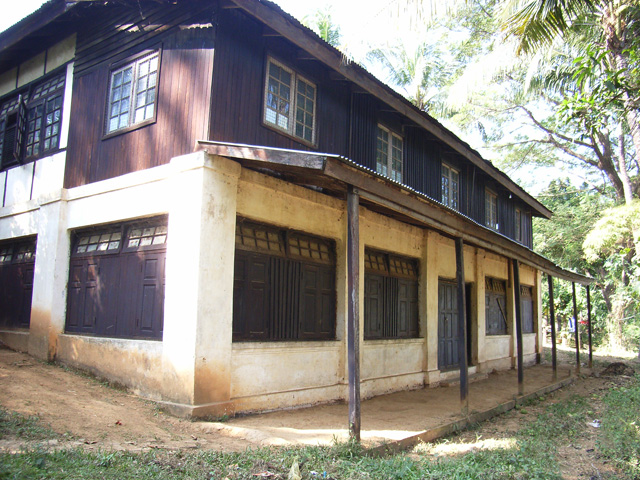
The British Club in Katha (only the ground floor remains from Orwell's time)

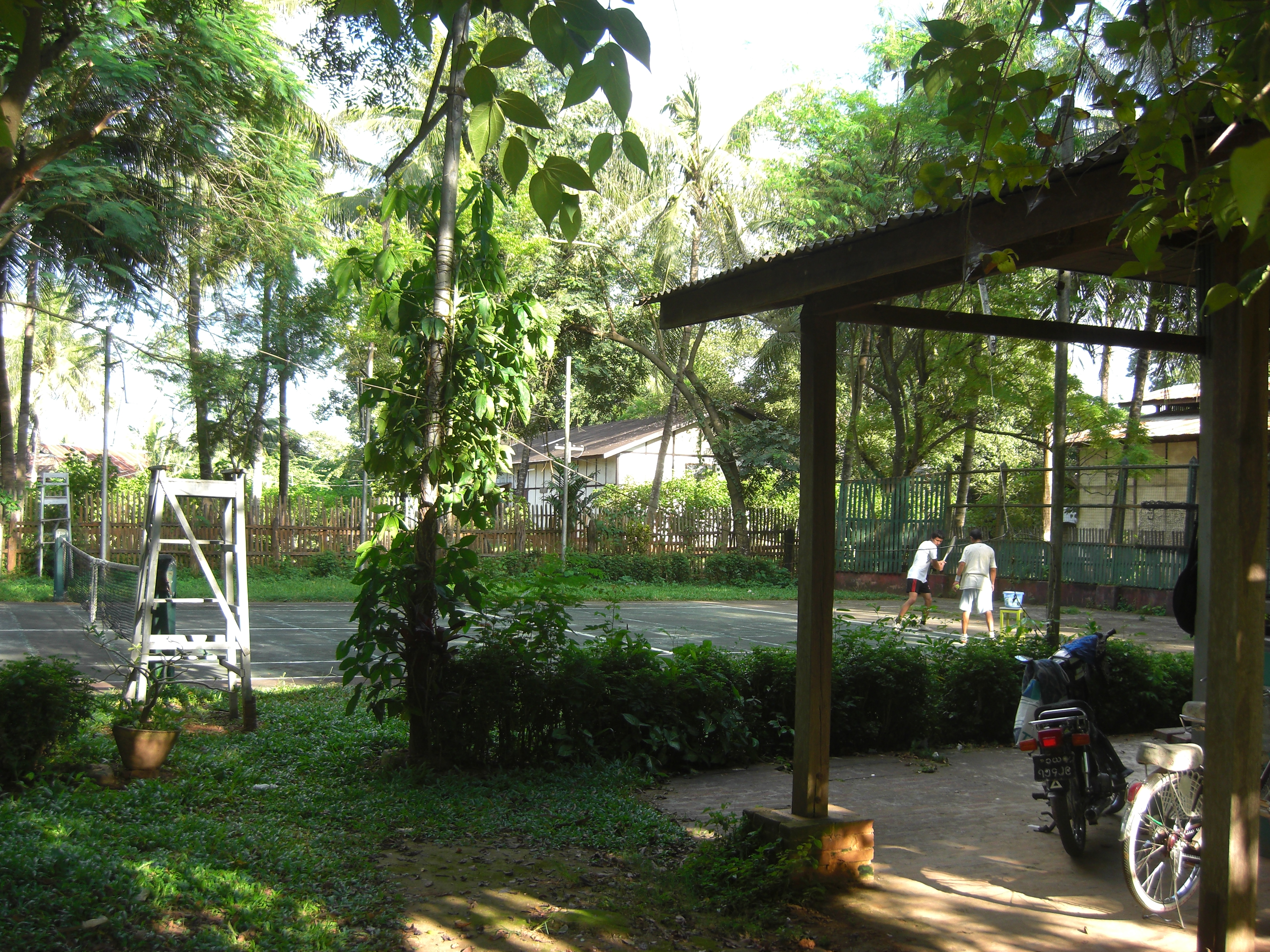
Tennis court at the old British Club

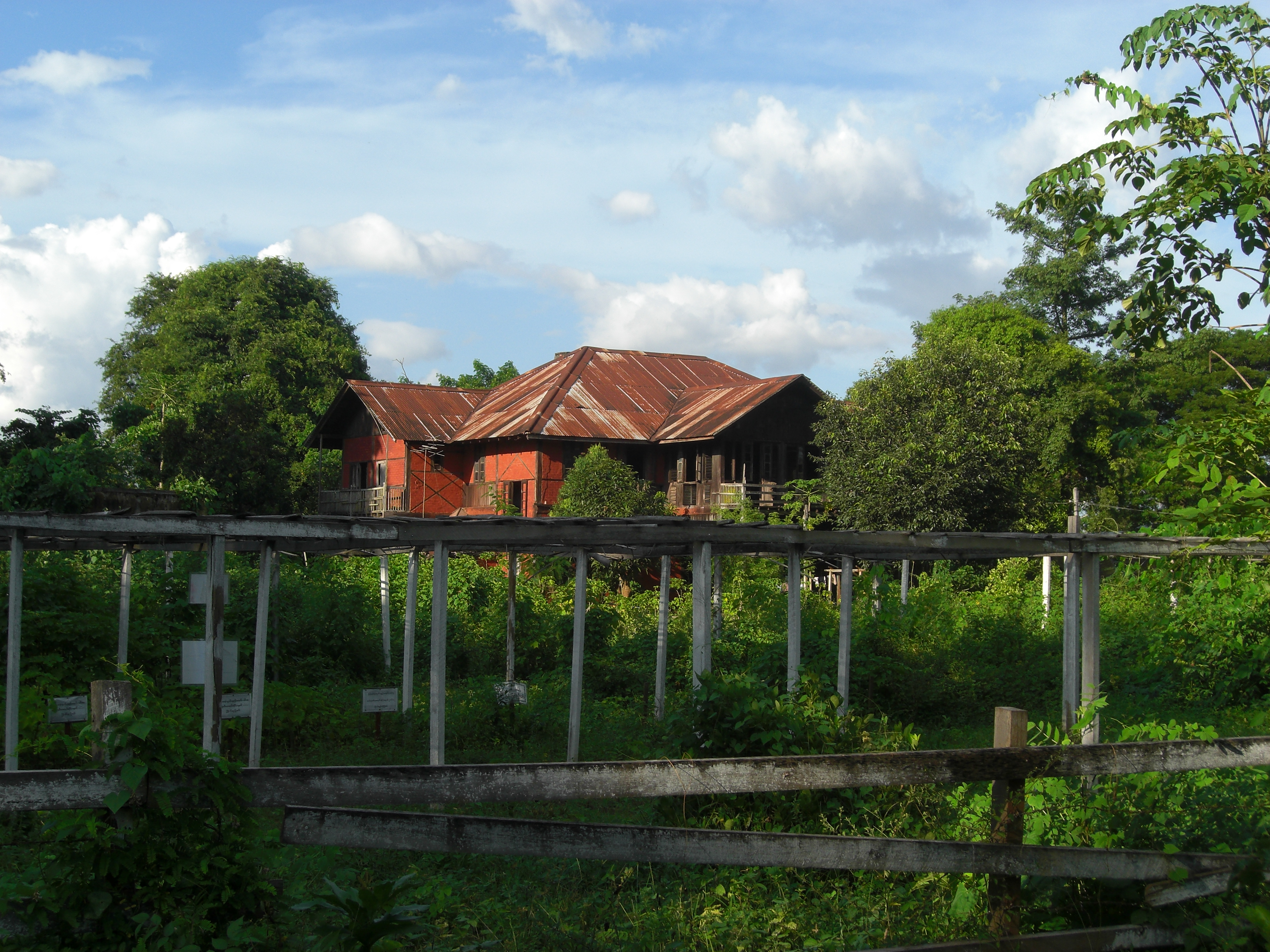
Orwell's house in Katha

== Notable people ==
- Aung Kyaw Myat, deputy Minister of Science and Technology (2013-2015)
