= Kawlin =

Kawlin ကောလင်းမြို့
- Town
- Location in Myanmar
- Coordinates: 23°47′25″N 95°40′50″E
- Country: Myanmar
- Region: Sagaing Region
- District: Kawlin District
- Township: Kawlin Township

Area
  - Total: 1.06 sq mi (2.75 km^{2})
- Elevation: 604 ft (184 m)

Population (2019)
  - Total: 25,254
  - Density: 23,800/sq mi (9,180/km^{2})
  - Ethnicities: Bamar
  - Religions: Buddhism
- Time zone: UTC+6.30 (MST)

Kawlin (ကောလင်းမြို့) is a town in the Sagaing Division in Myanmar. Since December 2018 it has been the administration headquarters for Kawlin District as well as Kawlin Township. As of 2019, the town had a population of 25,254, up from 21,431 in 2014. The town is further subdivided into 8 wards.

In late 2023, Kawlin became the first district capital to fall to resistance forces in the 2021 Myanmar civil war.

== History ==
Under the Burmese monarchy governors of Kawlin were by royal appointment. The site of the old town where they ruled is about a mile west of Kawlin, and is reduced to a village. The new town of Kawlin was formed by consolidating the former villages of Taungin (တောင်အင်း) and Northin (မြောက်အင်းခေါ်).

On 6 November 2023, the town came fully under control of the People’s Defense Forces (PDF) during the ongoing civil war. By December 2023, it was restored to full civilian rule. However, Tatmadaw forces recaptured the town on February 10, 2024. Around 80 percent of the town has reportedly been destroyed when Tatmadaw forces started burning homes in the aftermath of their recapture of the town.

== See also ==
- Sagaing Region
