= Banmauk =

Banmauk မၢၼ်ႈမွၵ်ႇ
- Town
- Location in Myanmar
- Coordinates: 24°24′N 95°51′E
- Country: Myanmar
- Region: Sagaing Region
- District: Katha District
- Township: Banmauk Township
- Time zone: UTC+6:30 (MST)

Banmauk or Bamauk (Shan: မၢၼ်ႈမွၵ်ႇ, Manmawk) is a town in Katha District, Sagaing Region in Myanmar. It is connected by road to Pinlebu which links with Phaungbyin and Kawlin. The township is home to the Shan, Kadu and Kanan ethnic minorities. The area has witnessed fighting between communists and the government troops. The town was captured by the People's Defence Force from the Shanni Nationalities Army and the Tatmadaw on 20 September 2025. The Tatmadaw retook the town on 8 February 2026 with support of the Shanni Nationalities Army.
