= Village tract =

4th level administrative division in Myanmar

A village tract (Burmese: ကျေးရွာအုပ်စု; also spelt village-tract), also called overvillage, is a fourth-level administrative subdivision of Myanmar's rural townships. As of August 2015, there are 13,602 village tracts in Myanmar, consisting of 70,838 villages. The equivalent for urban townships is a ward.

Elections are held at the village tract level, and the village tract is the main body administrating between the state or region and the village. The villages themselves vary in size and a village tract can have between three and eleven villages.

== See also ==
- Administrative divisions of Burma
