= Katha District =

Coordinates: 23°54′N 95°40′E

- District
- Country: Myanmar
- Region: Sagaing Region
- No. of Townships: 4
- Capital: Katha
- Time zone: UTC+6.30 (MST)

Katha District is the northeasternmost district in Sagaing Region of Myanmar (Burma). Its administrative center is the town of Katha.

== Townships ==
Townships of Katha district

The district consists of the townships of:

Katha Township
Indaw Township
Banmauk Township
Htigyaing Township

On 5 December 2018, Kawlin Township, Wuntho Township, and Pinlebu Township were separated from Katha district to form Kawlin District.

== Economy ==
The area is supported by rice farming, fisheries and timbering.
