= Htangsan =

- Village
- Location in Burma
- Coordinates: 26°10′58″N 95°17′43″E
- Country: Burma
- Region: Sagaing Region
- District: Naga Self-Administered Zone
- Township: Lahe Township
- Time zone: UTC+6.30 (MST)

Htangsan, also Htangsan Naga, is a village in Lahe Township, Naga Self-Administered Zone, in the Sagaing Region of northwestern Burma. It is located in the Naga Hills, to the northwest of Hwekum and to the southwest of Lahe. At the centre of the village is a circle with a grey roofed building. Human sacrifice and headhunting has been documented in the Lahe Township.
