= Lungwa =

Village in India and Myanmar

- Village
- Interactive map of Lungwa
- Coordinates: 26.661379°N 95.219849°E
- Country: India and Myanmar
- Region: Northeast India and Northwestern Myanmar
- State/Division: Nagaland and Sagaing Region
- District/Sub-division: Mon District and Naga Self-Administered Zone

Population (2011)
  - Total: 6,703
  - Dialect: Konyak
- Website: nagaland.nic.in

Lungwa, also known as Longwa, is a Konyak Naga village located in India and Myanmar (Burma) that straddles both sides in the Mon District of the Indian state of Nagaland and the Naga Self-Administered Zone of the Sagaing Region of Myanmar.

The Lungwa Angh's house is situated in the middle of the border of India and Myanmar. One half of the Angh's house falls within Indian territory, whereas the other half lies under Myanmar control. However, the whole village is controlled by the Angh. He has 60 wives and he rules over 60 villages of the Konyaks extending up to Myanmar and Arunachal Pradesh.

== Transportation ==
The village has a road connecting it to Loji Village in Myanmar's Sagaing Division, that also provides access to the larger Tatmadaw military towns of Lahe and Yengjong in Myanmar.

== See also ==
- India–Myanmar border
