= Aonbaw =

- Village
- Location in Burma
- Coordinates: 26°24′37″N 95°23′13″E
- Country: Burma
- Region: Sagaing Region
- District: Naga Self-Administered Zone
- Township: Lahe Township
- Time zone: UTC+6.30 (MST)

Aonbaw is a village in Lahe Township, Naga Self-Administered Zone, in the Sagaing Region of northwestern Burma. It is located in the Naga Hills, to the north of Lahe. Human sacrifice and headhunting has been documented in the Lahe Township.
