= Tangsa language =

Sino-Tibetan language spoken in Burma and India

Tangsa
- 𖪰𖩵𖪂𖪫𖩸
- The word 'Gehay' (Dog) in Tangsa script
- Native to: Burma, India
- Ethnicity: Tangsa people
- Native speakers: 110,000 (2010-2012)
- Language family: Sino-Tibetan: Brahmaputran; Konyak; Tangsa–Nocte; Tangsa
- Dialects: Muklom; Pangwa Naga; Ponthai; Tikhak
- Writing system: Latin alphabet, Tangsa alphabet

Language codes
- ISO 639-3: Variously: nst – Tangsa (multiple varieties) nqq – Kyan-Karyaw nlq – Lao Naga
- Glottolog: tang1379 Tangsa

Tangsa, also known as Tase and Tase Naga, is a Sino-Tibetan language or language cluster spoken by the Tangsa people of Burma and north-eastern India. Some varieties, such as Shangge (Shanke), are likely distinct languages. There are about 60,000 speakers in Burma and 40,000 speakers in India. The dialects of Tangsa have disparate levels of lexical similarity, ranging from 35%–97%.

== Geographical distribution ==
Tangsa is spoken in the following locations of Myanmar:

- Hkamti District, Sagaing Division: Nanyun, Pangsau, Lahe, and Hkamti townships
- Myitkyina District, Kachin State: Shinbwiyan and Tanai townships

In India, Tangsa is spoken in Arunachal Pradesh and Assam. Below are locations for some varieties of Tangsa.

- Jugli: Kantang, Longlung, and Rangran villages, central Tirap District, Arunachal (Rekhung 1988)
- Lungchang: Changlang, Rangkatu, and Kengkhu villages, eastern Tirap District, Arunachal (Rekhung 1988)
- Tutsa: Sabban area, Changlang Subdivision, western Changlang District (also in southeastern Tirap District), Arunachal (Rekhung 1992)
- Chamchang (Kimsing): Nongtham, Jotinkaikhe, Kharsang, Songking, Injan of Miao subdivision and Nampong-Jairampur-Nampong subdivision of Changlang district. The Chamchang dialect is adopted as a lingua franca by many sub-tribes in Sagaing Division of Myanmar. In India, Nagamese or Nefamese are typically used as a lingua franca. The first complete Bible of the Tangsas has been translated in Chamchang (Kimsing) by the Bible Society of India.
- Mossang: Neotan Village, Old Plone, New Plone, Songking, Namphainong, Nayang village, Miao area, and Theremkan village, Nampong circle, Changlang District, Arunachal (Rekhung 1999)

Ethnologue also lists the following languages:

- Lao Naga (Law, Loh) (ISO 639 nlq): 1,000 speakers (as of 2012) in Lahe Township. Most similar to Chen-Kayu Naga and the Chuyo and Gakat dialects of Tase Naga.
- Chen-Kayu Naga (Kyan-Karyaw Naga) (ISO 639 nqq): 9,000 speakers (as of 2012) in 13 villages of Lahe Township. Dialects are Chen (Kyan) and Kayu (Kahyu, Kaiyaw, Karyaw, Kayaw). Most similar to the Chuyo and Gakat dialects of Tase Naga.

== Dialects ==
There are four principal varieties:

- Muklom
- Pangwa Naga
- Ponthai
- Tikhak

=== Morey (2017) ===
Within Tangsa, the Pangwa group has about 20 subgroups in India. The Pangwa had migrated from Myanmar to India in the 20th century (Morey 2017). Pangwa subgroups are listed below, with autonyms listed in parentheses, where superscript digits are language-specific tone-marks.

- Tonglum (autonym: cho¹lim¹, ʨolim, Cholim)
- Langching (autonym: lo²cʰaŋ³, loʨʰaŋ, Lochhang)
- Kimsing (autonym: ʨamʨaŋ, Chamchang)
- Ngaimong (autonym: ŋaimɔŋ)
- Maitai (maitai; Motai)
- Ronrang (autonym: rɯra, Rera, Rüra)
- Sangkhe
- Lakkai (Lakki)
- Mossang (Mueshaung)
- Morang (Mungray)
- Hachheng (Hacheng)
- Khalak (Khilak)
- Longri
- Sangwal
- Jogly (Joglei)
- Lungkhe
- Haso
- Dunghi

The Tikhak group consists of:

- Longchang
- Tikhak
- Nokjah
- Yongkuk
- Kato (currently extinct)

Other subgroups that do not belong to either the Pangwa or Tikhak groups are:

- Moklum
- Ponthai (Nukta)
- Havi (Hawoi)
- Hakhun (haˀkʰun)
- Thamphang (ʨampaŋ, Champang)
- Thamkok (Chamkok)
- Halang (Hehle)

Besides Pangwa and Tikhak, other Tangsa groups are:

- Muklom (Muklom, Hawoi)
- Phong (also known as Ponthai)

=== Lann (2018) ===
Lann (2018:8) classifies the Tangsa language varieties as follows, and recognizes 11 subgroups. IPA transcriptions for dialect names are also provided (Lann 2018:4-6), where superscript digits are language-specific tone-marks.

- Upland Pangva: Shecyü (ɕe².ȶɯ²), Chamchang (ȶəm².ȶəŋ²), Mungre (muŋ².ɹe²), Mueshaungx (mɯ³.ɕaoŋ³), Lochang (lo³.ȶʰaŋ³), Haqcyeng (haʔ.ȶeŋ²), Ngaimong (ŋaj².moŋ²), Shangvan (ɕəŋ².van²), Joglei (juk.li²), Cholim (ȶo².lim²), Longri (loŋ³.ɹi²), Jöngi (dʒɵ².ŋi³), Maitai (maj³.taj³)
- Eastern Pangva
  - Eastern Pangva A: Lungkhi (luŋ².kʰi³), Khalak (kʰ.lək), Gachai (ɡ.ȶʰaj²)
  - Eastern Pangva B: Rinkhu (ɹin².kʰu²), Näkkhi (nək.kʰi²), Rasi (ɹa².si²), Rasa (ɹa².sa²), Rera (ɹe².ɹa²), Kochung (ko².ȶʰuŋ²), Shokra (ɕok.ɹa²), Shangthi (ɕəŋ².tʰi²), Shanchin (ɕan².ȶʰin²), Khangchin, Khangdu, Lawnyung (lon².juŋ²), Yangbaivang (jəŋ².ban².vəŋ²), Gaqha (ɡaʔ.ha²), Raraq (ɹa².ɹaʔ), Raqnu (ɹaʔ.nu²), Kotlum (kot.lum²), Assen (a.sen²), Hasa (ha².sa³)
- Yungkuk-Tikhak: Yungkuk (joŋ².kuk), Tikhak (ti².kʰak), Longchang (loŋ³.ȶaŋ²), Muklum (mok.lum²), Havi (ha².vi), Kato (ka².to³), Nukyaq
- Ole: Nahen (na³.hen³), Lumnu (lum².nu³), Yangno (jɐŋ².no³), Kumgaq, Haqpo (haʔ.po²), Chamkok (ȶəm².kok), Champang (ȶəm².pəŋ²), Haqcyum (haʔ.ȶum), Tawke (to².ke³), Hokuq (ho³.kuʔ)
- Kon-Pingnan: Yongkon (kon³), Chawang, Nukvuk, Miku (mi².ku²), Pingku (piŋ².ku²), Nansa (nan³.sa³, Nyinshao)
- Haqte: Haqkhii (haʔ.kʰɤ²), Haqman (haʔ.man²), Bote (bo.te²), Lama (ku³.ku²), Haqkhun (haʔ.kʰun²), Nocte (nok.te²), Phong (pʰoŋ, Ponthai), Tutsa (tup.sa³)
- Olo: Haqsik (haʔ.tsik), Lajo (la².jo²)
- Ola: Kaishan (kaj².ɕan³)
- Sandzik (san².ðik)
- Cyokat: Chuyo (ȶu³.jo²), Gaqkat (ɡ.kaʔ), Wancho (vən³.ȶo²)
- Kunyon: Kuku (ku³.ku²), Makyam (poŋ².ɲon³, Pongnyuan)

Lann (2018:4) lists the Aktung, Angsü-Angsa, Giiyii, Gawngkaq, Khangcyu, Khangdo, Kumgaq, Punlam, Nukyaq, and Vangtak-Vangkaq dialects as being extinct or nearly extinct.

Kaisan is a Northern Naga language variety spoken in several villages (including the village of Kaisan Chálám) in the Patkai area of Sagaing Region, Myanmar, as well as in Arunachal Pradesh, India.

== Phonology ==
=== Consonants ===
		Labial	Dental	Alveolar	Palatal	Velar	Glottal
Nasal		m	(n̪)	n	ɲ	ŋ	
Plosive	voiceless	p	t̪	t		k	ʔ
Plosive	aspirated	pʰ	t̪ʰ	tʰ		kʰ	
Plosive	voiced	b		d		ɡ	
Affricate	voiceless			t͡s	t͡ɕ		
Affricate	aspirated				t͡ɕʰ		
Fricative	voiceless			s	ʃ	x	h
Fricative	voiced	β ~ w			ʒ ~ j	(ɣ)	
Approximant	central	β ~ w		ɹ	ʒ ~ j		
Approximant	lateral			l			

- Sounds /β/ and /ʒ/ may vary freely between approximant sounds [w] and [j] and their fricative sounds, although the fricative sounds [β, ʒ] are more frequent. /ʒ/ may also be heard as a palatal [ʝ] in the Muklom dialect.
- /x/ is mainly heard in the Muklom, Choglim and Joglei dialects.
- A voiced dental fricative /ð/ may occur in the Ngaimong and Shecyü dialects.
- [ɣ] is only heard as a contrastive sound among some speakers.
- [n̪] may be heard as an allophone of /n/ by some speakers when followed by the diphthong /ɯi/.
- /ɹ/ may also be heard as [ɹ̠] or [ɻ] in the Muklom dialect.

=== Vowels ===
Vowels in the Mueshaungx dialect
	Front	Central	Back	
Close	i		ɯ	u
Close-mid	e	ə	ɤ	o
Open-mid		ə	ɔ	
Open		a		

There are 12 diphthongs, noted as: /ui/; /ɯi, ɯu/; /əi, əu/; /oi/; /ɔə, ɔəi/; /ɤi, ɤu/; /ai, au/.

Vowels in the Muklom dialect
	Front	Central	Back	
Close	i	ɨ	u, uː	
Close-mid	e			
Open-mid	ɛ		ʌ	ɔ, ɔː
Open		a		

== Orthography ==
=== Tangsa alphabet ===
Tangsa 𖪰𖩵𖪂𖪫𖩸 𖪫𖪏𖪴𖩻𖪇𖪐
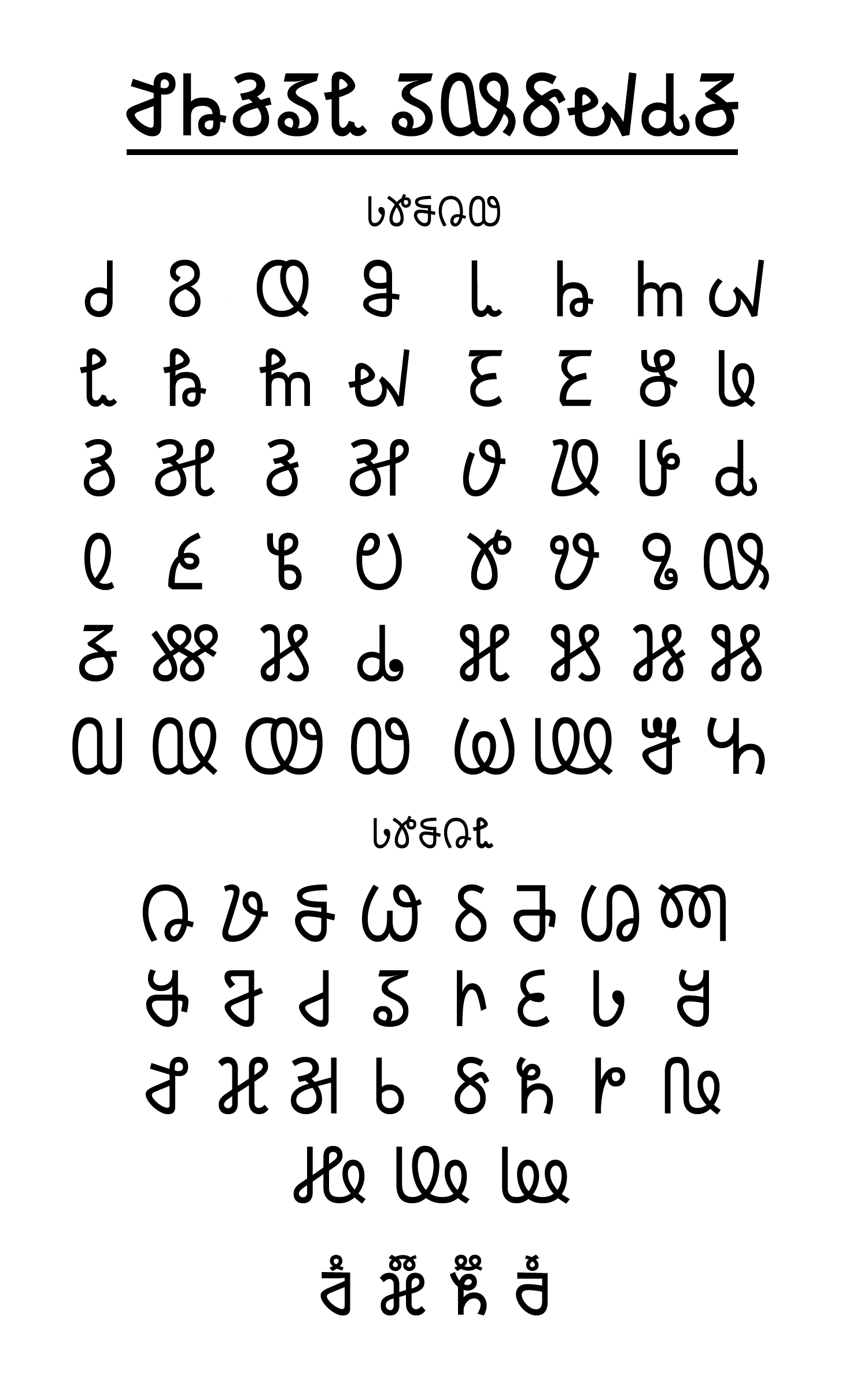
- Tangsa Alphabet chart (vowels first 6 rows, consonants last 5 rows)
- Script type: Alphabet
- Creator: Lakhum Mossang
- Published: 1990
- Languages: Tangsa

Related scripts
- Parent systems: Original invention: Tangsa

ISO 15924
- ISO 15924: Tnsa (275), Tangsa

Unicode
- Unicode alias: Tangsa
- Unicode range: U+16A70–U+16ACF

In 1990, Mr. Lakhum Mossang from Namphai Nong, Arunachal Pradesh in India created an alphabet for the Tangsa language. He taught the alphabet in public events and festivals, and promoted the script with community organisations and schools. In 2021, there were about 100 people who are using the script. The Tangsa Script Development Committee was founded in 2019 and continues development of the script after the passing of Lakhum Mossang to accommodate the wide range of Tangsa varieties spoken in the region. The script has not yet gained widespread adoption.

The alphabet has separate letters for each tone on every vowel, leading to an unusually high number, with 48 vowels in total and 32 consonants.

Tangsa Alphabet (𖪰𖩵𖪂𖪫𖩸 𖪫𖪏𖪴𖩻𖪇𖪐 Tangsa Mossang)
Vowels
𖩰 oz IPA: /o˩/	𖩱 oc IPA: /o˧/	𖩲 oq IPA: /oˀ/	𖩳 ox IPA: /o˧/	𖩴 az IPA: /a˩/	𖩵 ac IPA: /a˧/	𖩶 aq IPA: /aˀ/	𖩷 ax IPA: /a˧/
𖩸 vz IPA: /ə˩/	𖩹 vc IPA: /ə˧/	𖩺 vq IPA: /əˀ/	𖩻 vx IPA: /ə˧/	𖩼 ez IPA: /e˩/	𖩽 ec IPA: /e˧/	𖩾 eq IPA: /eˀ/	𖩿 ex IPA: /e˧/
𖪀 iz IPA: /i˩/	𖪁 ic IPA: /i˧/	𖪂 iq IPA: /iˀ/	𖪃 ix IPA: /i˧/	𖪄 uz IPA: /u˩/	𖪅 uc IPA: /u˧/	𖪆 uq IPA: /uˀ/	𖪇 ux IPA: /u˧/
𖪈 awz IPA: /ɔ˩/	𖪉 awc IPA: /ɔ˧/	𖪊 awq IPA: /ɔˀ/	𖪋 awx IPA: /ɔ˧/	𖪌 uiz IPA: /ɯ˩/	𖪍 uic IPA: /ɯ˧/	𖪎 uiq IPA: /ɯˀ/	𖪏 uix IPA: /ɯ˧/
𖪐 final ng IPA: /ŋ/	𖪑 long uex IPA: /ɤ˧ː/	𖪒 short uez IPA: /ɤ˩/	𖪓 short awx IPA: /ɔ˧/	𖪔 uec IPA: /ɤ˧/	𖪕 uez IPA: /ɤ˩/	𖪖 ueq IPA: /ɤˀ/	𖪗 uex IPA: /ɤ˧/
𖪘 uiuz IPA: /ɯu˩/	𖪙 uiuc IPA: /ɯu˧/	𖪚 uiuq IPA: /ɯuˀ/	𖪛 uiux IPA: /ɯu˧/	𖪜 mz IPA: /m̩˩/	𖪝 mc IPA: /m̩˧/	𖪞 mq IPA: /m̩ˀ/	𖪟 mx IPA: /m̩˧/
Consonants
𖪠 k IPA: /k/	𖪡 kh IPA: /kʰ/	𖪢 g IPA: /g/	𖪣 ng IPA: /ŋ/	𖪤 s IPA: /s/	𖪥 y IPA: /j/	𖪦 w IPA: /w/	𖪧 p IPA: /p/
𖪨 ny IPA: /ɲ/	𖪩 ph IPA: /pʰ/	𖪪 b IPA: /b/	𖪫 m IPA: /m/	𖪬 n IPA: /n/	𖪭 h IPA: /h/	𖪮 l IPA: /l/	𖪯 ht IPA: /tʰ/
𖪰 t IPA: /t/	𖪱 d IPA: /d/	𖪲 r IPA: /r/	𖪳 nh IPA: /n̯/	𖪴 sh IPA: /ʃ/	𖪵 c IPA: /tɕ/	𖪶 ts IPA: /ts/	𖪷 gh IPA: /ɣ/
𖪸 htt IPA: /t̪ʰ/	𖪹 th IPA: /t̪/	𖪺 x IPA: /x/		𖪻 f IPA: /f/	𖪼 dh IPA: /ð/	𖪽 ch IPA: /tɕʰ/	𖪾 z IPA: /z/

==== Unicode ====
The Tangsa alphabet was added to the Unicode Standard in September, 2021 with the release of version 14.0.

The Unicode block for Tangsa is U+16A70–U+16ACF. The 48 base vowels (with tones) are encoded in U+16A70–U+16A9F, the 31 base consonants are encoded in U+16AA0–U+16ABE, and ten decimal digits are encoded in U+16AC0–U+16AC9:

Tangsa^{[1]}^{[2]} Official Unicode Consortium code chart (PDF)
	0	1	2	3	4	5	6	7	8	9	A	B	C	D	E	F
U+16A7x	𖩰	𖩱	𖩲	𖩳	𖩴	𖩵	𖩶	𖩷	𖩸	𖩹	𖩺	𖩻	𖩼	𖩽	𖩾	𖩿
U+16A8x	𖪀	𖪁	𖪂	𖪃	𖪄	𖪅	𖪆	𖪇	𖪈	𖪉	𖪊	𖪋	𖪌	𖪍	𖪎	𖪏
U+16A9x	𖪐	𖪑	𖪒	𖪓	𖪔	𖪕	𖪖	𖪗	𖪘	𖪙	𖪚	𖪛	𖪜	𖪝	𖪞	𖪟
U+16AAx	𖪠	𖪡	𖪢	𖪣	𖪤	𖪥	𖪦	𖪧	𖪨	𖪩	𖪪	𖪫	𖪬	𖪭	𖪮	𖪯
U+16ABx	𖪰	𖪱	𖪲	𖪳	𖪴	𖪵	𖪶	𖪷	𖪸	𖪹	𖪺	𖪻	𖪼	𖪽	𖪾	
U+16ACx	𖫀	𖫁	𖫂	𖫃	𖫄	𖫅	𖫆	𖫇	𖫈	𖫉						
Notes 1.As of Unicode version 18.0 2.Grey areas indicate non-assigned code points

=== Roman alphabet ===
Beyond the use of Lakhum Mossang's script, Tangsa varieties are generally written in the Latin alphabet with multiple different spelling conventions in use. One such Roman orthography is that for Mossang, designed by Reverend Gam Win and used in the Mossang translation of the Bible. Different Roman orthographies are in use among different subtribes, often with considerable variation. These differences tend to follow Christian denominational divisions.

The Gam Win Romanization for Mossang is as follows:

==== Tonal vowels ====
Each vowel of the Tangsa alphabet notes a combination representing one of 11 phonemic base vowels:

o	[o]
v	[ə]
i	[i]

a	[a]
e	[e]
u	[u]

aw	[ɔ]
ue / ü	[ɤ]

ui	[ɯ]
uiu	[ɯu]
m	[m̩]

modified by one of four distinctive vocalic tones (noted in Latin transcriptions by trailing consonants appended after the base vowel):

-c	[˦]	thuic tsanz (voice-hard) - mid-high level or rising
-x	[˧]	thuic hvlz (voice-middle) - mid-high falling
-z	[˩]	thuic nyenz (voice-soft) - low falling with creaky phonation
-q	[ˀ]	thuic htaq (voice-break/cut) - short, final glottal stop

As well, the Tangsa alphabet includes a few additional separate letters for distinctive tonal vowels:

-ng	[ŋ]	(final) - modifier written after the base vowel+tone
awx	[ɔ̆˧]	(short variant) - usually not distinguished in Latin transcriptions
uex	[ɤː˧]	(long variant) - usually not distinguished in Latin transcriptions
uez	[ɤ̆˩]	(short variant) - usually not distinguished in Latin transcriptions

==== Consonants ====
Unlike Brahmic-derived abugidas most often used for languages in India and Burma, the 31 consonants of the Tangsa alphabet (used to write Sino-Tibetan languages and not Brahmic-based languages) don't carry any inherent vowel:

k	[k]
kh	[kʰ]
g	[g]
ng	[ŋ]

s	[s]
y	[j]
w	[w]
p	[p]

ny	[ɲ]
ph	[pʰ]
b	[b]

m	[m]
n	[n]
h	[h]
l	[l]

ht	[tʰ]
t	[t]
d	[d]
r	[r]

nh	[n̪]
sh	[ʃ]
c	[t͡ɕ]
ts	[t͡s]

gh	[ɣ]
htt	[t̪ʰ]
th	[t̪]
x	[x]

f	[f]
dh	[d̪]
ch	[t͡ɕʰ]
z	[z]
