= Konyak =

Konyak may refer to:

- Konyak people, of Nagaland, Northeast India
- Konyak language, the Tibeto-Burman language they speak
- Konyak languages, a Tibeto-Burman linguistic subgroup
- P. Paiwang Konyak, Indian politician

== See also ==
- Cognac
- Konjak
