= Makyam language =

Sino-Tibetan language of Myanmar

Makyam
- Makyan
- Paung Nyuan
- Native to: Myanmar
- Native speakers: 4,000 (2008)
- Language family: Sino-Tibetan: Brahmaputran; Konyak; (unclassified); Makyam

Language codes
- ISO 639-3: umn
- Glottolog: maky1235

Makyam Naga (Lasam, Macham Naga, Makyan, Pongnyun, Paung Nyuan) is a Sino-Tibetan language spoken in Myanmar. The Western Makyam Naga dialects share 99% lexical similarity.

It is closely related to other Konyak languages. Makyam is 31%–35% lexically similar to Ponyo-Gongwang Naga, 29%–36% with Leinong Naga, and 27%–28% with Lao variety of Konyak Naga.

== Classification ==
Makyam belongs to the Khiamniungic subgroup within the Konyak–Chang group of languages (Naw Sawu 2016:6). It is closely related to Leinong than to Khiamniungan.

- Khiamniungic
  - Khiamniungan Naga
  - Leinong-Makyam
    - Leinong Naga
    - Makyam Naga

== Distribution ==
Makyam is spoken in 13 villages of northeast Lahe Township and Hkamti Township, Sagaing Division, Myanmar (Ethnologue). Main dialect variation is between the western Makyan villages and Kuku villages.

Makyam is spoken in the following 18 villages, which are located just to the east of Lahe town in Lahe Township, Sagaing Division, Myanmar. They add up to a total of 1,026 households and 4,994 persons (Naw Sawu 2016:8). Old village names are given in parentheses.

- San Tong (Nouk Hai)
- Makyam (Ngaung Ke)
- Kha Lai (Khun Old Kha Lai)
- New Kha Lai (Pyan Kha Lai)
- Long Khin (Long Nouk)
- Lun Htaung
- Wutha (Zay Tam Nouk)
- Kuku Nokkon (Khaunouk Hai)
- Myang Kuku (Khaunouk Suam)
- Ahang Kuku
- Taw Law (New Wutha)
- Pin Htaung Lon Shout
- Lepandar
- Zi Phyu Kone, Kham Ti Township
- Sin Te
- Ma Kyam Kha
- Lahe
- Ma Kaw Rain

The majority of Makyam speakers can also speak Leinong, as the two languages are spoken in the same area (Naw Sawu 2016:10).

== Phonology ==
Consonants
	Labial	Dental	Alveolar	Palatal	Velar	Glottal
Plosive	pʰ p		tʰ t	tʃ	kʰ k g	ʔ
Fricative	v	θ	s z	ʃ ʒ	ɣ	h
Nasal	m		n	ɲ	ŋ	
Approximant	w		l r	j		

Vowels
	Front		Central	Back
	Unrounded	Rounded	Central	Back
High	i	y		u
Mid-high	e	ø	(ə)	o
Mid-low	ɛ			ɔ
Low			a	

- /ə/ only appears in open syllables.

Additionally, the following diphthongs have been observed: /ia/, /ua/, /uo/, /oa/, /ue/, /ɔu/, /uɛ/, /ei/, /ea/, /ie/, /iɛ/, /ou/, /au/, /ai/.

Makyam also has five tones:

- [ ˧˩ ] - mid-falling
- [ ˧˥ ] - mid-rising
- [ ˧ ] - mid, level
- [ ˥˩ ] - high-falling
- [ ˥ ] - high, level
