= Ponyo (disambiguation) =

Ponyo is a 2008 Japanese animated film.

Ponyo may also refer to:

- Ponyo, Lahe, a village in Myanmar
- Ponyo language, a language of Myanmar
- Matata Ponyo Mapon, Congolese political figure

== See also ==
- Poniou, a hamlet in England
