= Rangnuwk hum =

Place of worship for the Tangsa people

Rang Nuwk Hum is a worship place for the Tangsa people of Northeast India and Myanmar. "Rang" means the God, "Nuwk" means pray and "Hum" means a small house that contain a picture of the God Rangfrah.

Rangfrah is believed to be an incarnation of the Hindu god Shiva. Devotees go to a Rang Nuwk Hum everyday to give offerings and to pray which is followed by singing local bhajans.
