= 2021 Nagaland killings =

2021 massacre by Indian soldiers in Nagaland state of India

2021 Nagaland Killings
- Part of the Human rights issues in Northeast India
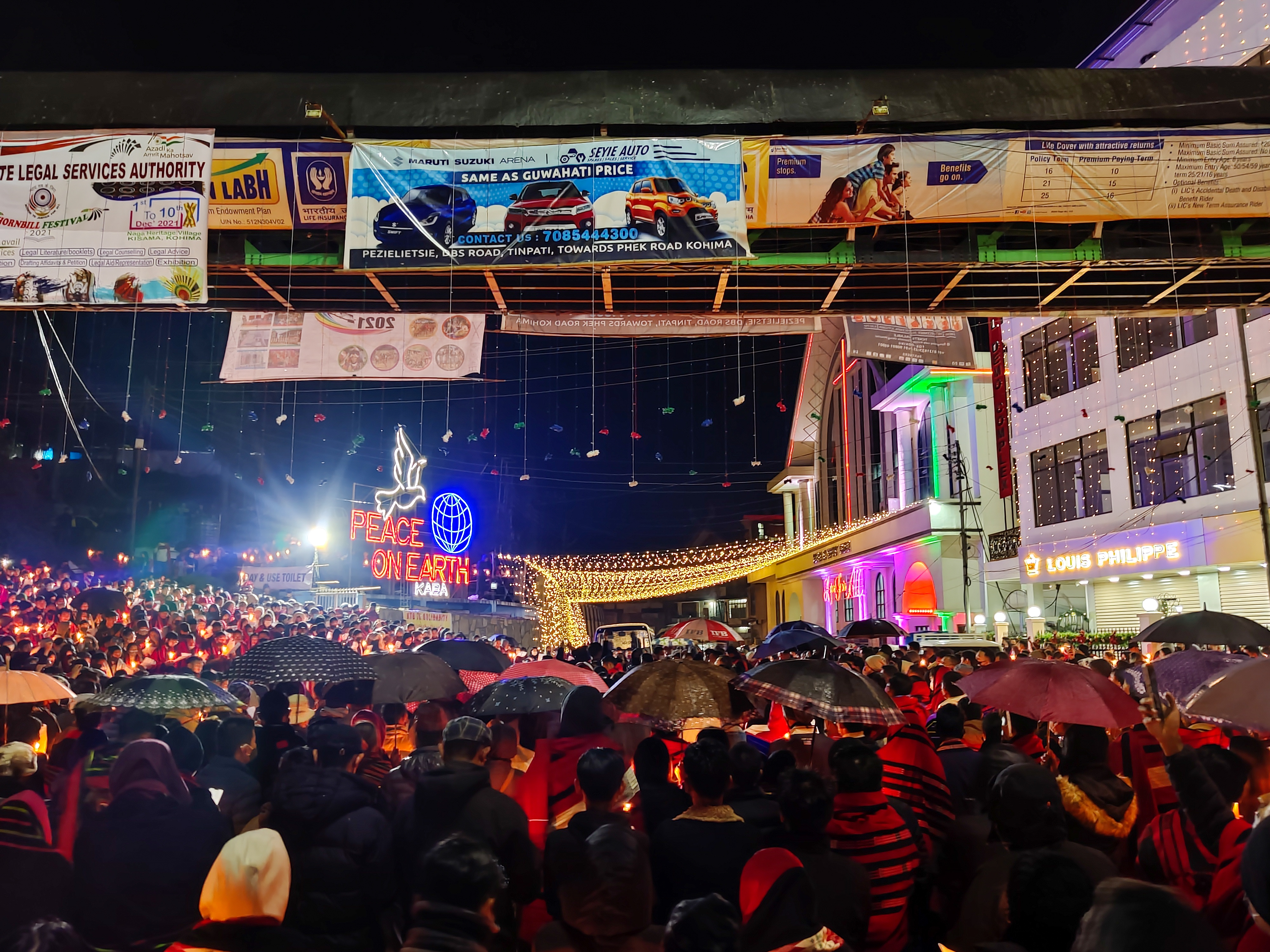
- Candlelight vigil organised at Kohima
- Date: 4–5 December 2021
- Location: Yatong–Langkhao, Oting, Mon District, Nagaland, India
- Methods: Ambush

Parties
| Indian Army: 21st Para Special Forces; Assam Rifles | Civilians |

Casualties and losses
| 1 killed | 14 killed |

On 4 December 2021, a unit of 21st Para Special Forces of the Indian Army killed six civilians near the village of Oting in the Mon District of Nagaland, India. Eight more civilians and a soldier were killed in subsequent violence. The killings were widely condemned with many calling to repeal and revoke the Armed Forces Special Powers Act. Due to the provisions of the act, the accused army personnels were not prosecuted.

== Background ==
Nagaland has been long beset with secessionist politics, often spilling into armed insurgency, to which the government has responded with a heavy presence of armed forces. In 1958, the Parliament of India enacted the Armed Forces Special Powers Act (AFSPA), which granted considerable leeway to armed forces and eliminated procedural safeguards. In addition, other laws and regulations make prosecution of army personnels impossible for human rights violations. This has resulted into several massacres in Nagaland as well as in Kashmir in the past. Despite several peace accords signed between insurgents groups and the Indian government, these laws still remain in force.

Prior to the 2021 killings, the Indian government had extended the application AFPSA across Nagaland for six months in June 2021. This decision was taken in less than a day after then Nagaland chief minister Neiphiu Rio had met with then India's home minister Rajnath Singh.

== Incidents ==
Oting is a village in Nagaland, within the Mon community development block. In the 2011 census, the population stood at 1266; 99% of them were classed under scheduled tribes with a 29% literacy rate. About 45.4% had annual employment exceeding half-a-year and were mostly cultivators; another 9.1% were "marginal workers" and mostly employed in household industries for less than 3 months.

=== Ambush ===
On the evening of 4 December 2021 at around 4:00–5:00 p.m. IST, a unit of 21st Para Special Forces ambushed an open-bed pickup truck—carrying civilians from Oting village (26°50′42″N 94°57′27″E) who were returning from a coal mine at Tiru—and opened fire. Six people died, and two received serious injuries.

The Army claims the targeting of civilians occurred due to an intelligence failure; they had suspected the vehicle to contain Naga insurgents. They further claim to have only opened fire when instructions to the vehicle to stop were not followed. The two survivors reject the claims, as did Nagaland Police upon a preliminary inquiry.

=== Discovery of bodies ===
Neighbouring villagers, apprehensive about the gunshots and villagers who were yet to return, soon arrived at the scene and intercepted a convoy of military vehicles; the troops claimed to be reinforcements who were shifting "injured people" to hospital and feigned ignorance about why the pickup truck stood splattered with blood. Subsequently, they were found to be transporting the dead to their base camp while also trying to change the attire of the deceased, evidently to stage an encounter.

In the ensuing melee, tires of army vehicles were punctured, and three vehicles torched; in accompanying gunfire, seven civilians were killed and twenty injured. The Indian Army claimed troops were attacked by machete-wielding villagers and claimed they opened fire under compulsion, as one infantryman was dead and others injured. Villagers rejected the claims and accused the Army of indiscriminate shooting. Nyawang Konyak, president of the Bharatiya Janata Party’s district unit claimed to have been fired at by Indian army soldiers despite his vehicle displaying a party-flag.

== Aftermath ==
=== Protests and remembrance ===
The following day, the Government of Nagaland imposed Section 144 in Mon District to restrict public assembly and movement; mobile internet and bulk SMS services were indefinitely suspended. Despite, public protests were organized — hundreds of men entered into a local camp of Assam Rifles in Mon Town during which one more civilian was killed.

The Eastern Nagaland People's Organisation (ENPO), which represents six tribes, withdrew from the ongoing annual Hornbill Festival. The Nagas hoisted black flags on all its morungs at the festival while the Konyaks decided to have its cultural troupe abstain from participating at the festival. This was followed by the other Naga cultural troupes also abstaining on 5 December. Two minutes of silence were also observed at the venue on the same day. Later on the evening of 5 December, the people of Kohima observed a power blackout for 30 minutes to mourn the death of the civilians. Candlelight marches were organised in Kohima, Dimapur and other towns on the same day. A six-hour shutdown was also called by the Naga Students' Federation. On 7 December, the Government of Nagaland announced that it would suspend all activities at the Hornbill Festival.

=== Politics ===
Amit Shah, Minister of Home Affairs of India, regretted the killings before the Parliament—which was in session—, and tasked a Special Investigation Team to complete an enquiry within a month; however, he reiterated the narrative of Indian Army in toto. The opposition staged a walkout in protest and later, condemned the government preventing political from accessing the area.

Even members of the state BJP unit and its political allies reject Shah's narrative — party president Temjen Imna Along held the event to be "summary execution as well as genocide." The local village council has since issued an informal ban on Indian Army entering into the village.

== Investigations ==
On 6 December, the Nagaland Police registered a First information report against the 21 Para Special Forces, bringing charges of first degree murder. The National Human Rights Commission of India has sent notices to the central and the state governments.

The Indian Army constituted a Court of Inquiry headed by a Major General to probe the circumstance under which the operation took place. In addition, it will also examine the credibility of the intelligence report which led to the detachment of the 21 Para Special Forces led by an officer of the rank of Major.

On 17 September 2024, the Supreme Court of India quashed criminal proceedings against the accused, citing the lack of government approval for prosecution.

== Funeral ==
On 6 December, all fifteen civilian casualties were interred in a mass funeral service, led by Chief Minister Neiphiu Rio.

== Legacy ==
The incident led to renewed calls to repeal the Armed Forces Special Powers Act. On 7 December, the Government of Nagaland announced that it would officially seek its repeal.

== See also ==
- List of massacres in Nagaland
- List of massacres in India
