= Gleadovia konyakianorum =

Scientific classification
- Kingdom: Plantae
- Clade: Tracheophytes
- Clade: Angiosperms
- Clade: Eudicots
- Clade: Asterids
- Order: Lamiales
- Family: Orobanchaceae
- Genus: Gleadovia
- Species: G. konyakianorum

Binomial name
- Gleadovia konyakianorum Odyuo, D.K.Roy & Aver.

Species of flowering plant

Gleadovia konyakianorum is a species of parasitic plant native to the Mon district in Nagaland, India.

The species named in honour of the Konyak people in Nagaland.

== Description ==
The species is a holoparasite, meaning that it derives its entire nutritional requirement from its host plant, which is a species of the genes Strobilanthes. It has no chlorophyll, but has a vascular system and absorbs nutrients from the host plant using a haustorium. The species is a root parasite, grows up to a height of 10 cm and bears white and tubular flowers.
