= Hwekum =

- Village
- Location in Burma
- Coordinates: 26°7′N 95°22′E
- Country: Burma
- Region: Sagaing Region
- District: Naga Self-Administered Zone
- Township: Lahe Township
- Time zone: UTC+6.30 (MST)

Hwekum is a village in Lahe Township, Naga Self-Administered Zone, in the Sagaing Region of northwestern Burma. It is located in a mountainous forest area to the northwest of Singkaling Hkamti. The village, close to the Indian border, has been subject to raids by the Ponyo Nagars, and since 2010 has been part of the new Naga-self-administered zone.
