= Leshi =

Leshi လေရှီးမြို့
- Location in Burma
- Coordinates: 25°27′0″N 94°57′0″E
- Country: Myanmar
- Division: Sagaing Region

Population (2005)
  - Ethnicities: Naga
  - Religions: Christianity
- Time zone: UTC+6.30 (MST)

Leshi (Burmese: လေရှီးမြို့; also spelt Lashi or Layshi), is a town in Naga Hills of Sagaing Division on the north-west frontier of Burma. According to the new 2008 Constitution of the military regime, it will now be grouped together with Lahe and Nanyun in Naga Self-Administered Zone. Leshi is reached via Htamanthi across the Chindwin River by boat from Homalin, and there are domestic flights from Yangon and Mandalay to Homalin.

The Naga New Year Festival is held on 15 January, and Lahe, Leshi, Hkamti and Nanyun hosted it in rotation until it became state-sponsored for the benefit of tourism and limited to Leshi and Lahe since 2003 during the time of the ousted prime minister Khin Nyunt.

Naga insurgents fighting against the Indian government have bases in the area over the Burmese side of the border. The Burmese army have launched offensives against these camps in recent years following top level meetings between the two governments.

In October 2008, a joint decision between India and Burma was reached to open a new border trade post at Avakhung-Leshi. The inhabitants of Avangkhu had moved their village 4 km closer from its original location of 8 km from the border in order to take advantage of the border trade. Leshi is 25 km from the border and 100 km from Htamanthi.
