= Nanyun Township =

Nanyun Township Namyung, Taiyawng
- Township
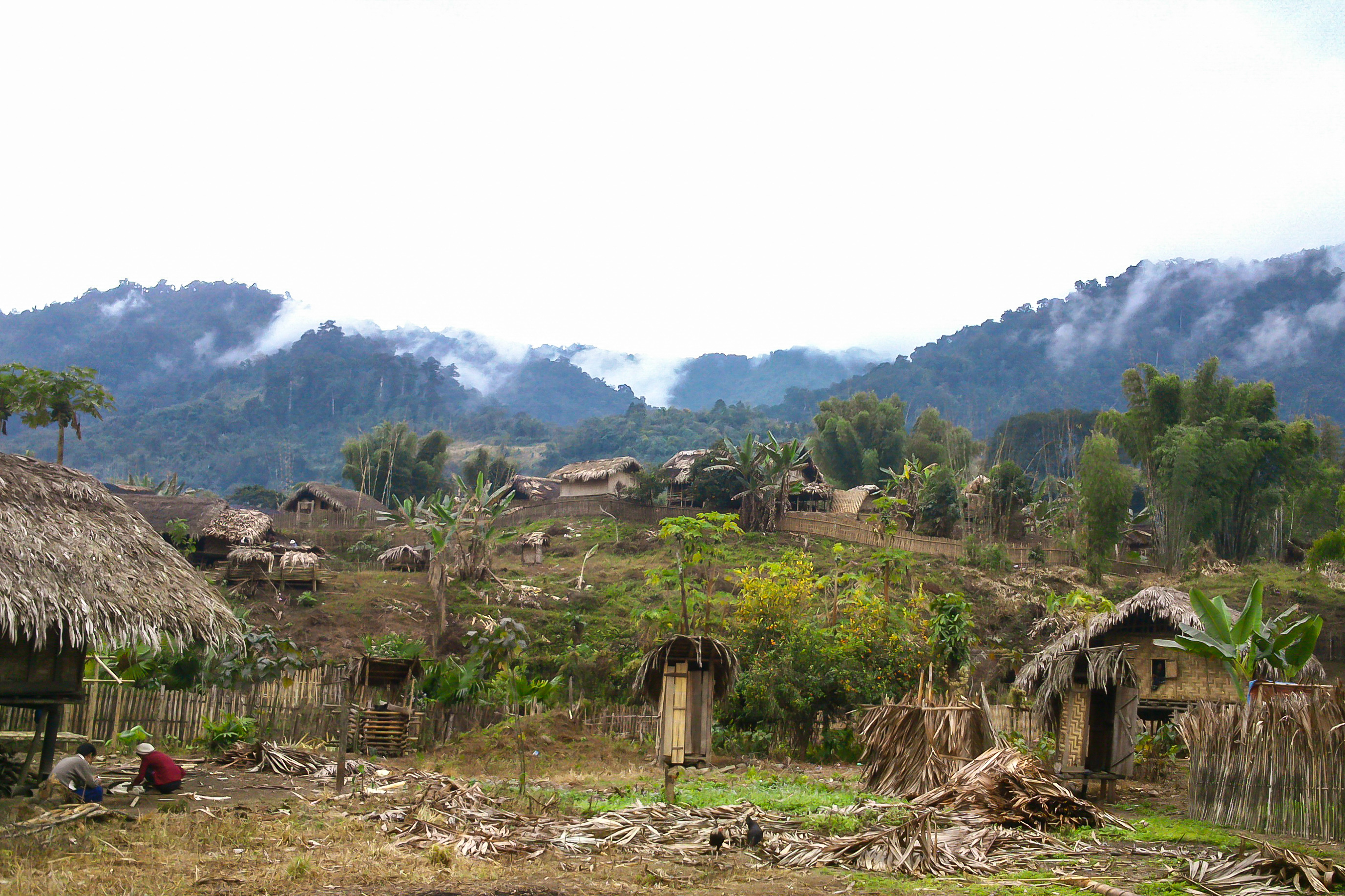

- Location in Naga SAZ

- Location in Burma
- Coordinates: 26°55′N 96°14′E
- Country: Burma
- Region: Sagaing Region
- District: Naga Self-Administered Zone
- Capital: Nanyun
- Time zone: UTC+6.30 (MST)

Nanyun Township (Burmese: နန်းယွန်းမြို့နယ်; also spelt Namyung) is a township located within the Naga Self-Administered Zone of the Sagaing Region, Myanmar. It is also part of the Naga Self-Administered Zone. The principal town is Nanyun.

The town has a military base known as Nanyun Garrison base. The town and nearby areas have a lot of Northeast insurgent camps which became a target of drone attacks by the military.

Location in Sagaing Region
