= Htet Naung =

Burmese politician

U Htet Naung

Member of the Pyithu Hluttaw
- In office 3 February 2016 – 1 February 2021
- Constituency: Lahe Township

Personal details
- Born: 4 September 1984 (age 41) Lahe Township, Myanmar
- Party: National League for Democracy
- Education: B.A. (Psychology), B.A. (Philosophy)

Htet Naung is a Burmese politician who served as a Pyithu Hluttaw MP for Lahe Township. He is a member of the National League for Democracy.

== Early life and education ==
Won Hla was born on 4 September 1984 in Lahe Township, Myanmar. He is an ethnic Naga.

== Political career ==
He is a member of the National League for Democracy. In the 2015 Myanmar general election, he was elected as a Pyithu Hluttaw member of parliament and elected representative from Lahe Township.
