= LZN =

LZN or lzn may refer to:

- LZN, the IATA code for Nangan Airport, Matsu Islands, Taiwan
- lzn, the ISO 639-3 code for Lainong language, Burma
