= Lainong language =

Sino-Tibetan language spoken in Burma

Lainong
- Htangan
- Native to: Burma
- Ethnicity: Lainong Naga
- Native speakers: 22,617 (Sainyiu, Anui) (2022)
- Language family: Sino-Tibetan: Brahmaputran; Konyak; Konyak–Chang? (close to Ponyo); Lainong

Language codes
- ISO 639-3: lzn
- Glottolog: lein1237

Lainong Naga, or Htangan, is a Sino-Tibetan language spoken in Burma. Lainong Naga is spoken in about 32 villages of Lahe Township and northwestern Hkamti Township, Naga Self-Administered Zone (formerly administered as part of Hkamti District), Sagaing Division, Myanmar (Ethnologue). Dialects are Zëūdiāng.

The Lainong Naga dialects share 89%–100% lexical similarity. Lainong Naga is 69%–75% lexically similar to Ponyo-Gongwang Naga, 62%–67% with Khiamniungan Naga, and 37%–41% with Lao variety of Konyak Naga.
