= Tutsa people =

Tibeto-Burmese ethnic group

Tutsa
Regions with significant populations
- India (Arunachal Pradesh)

Languages
- Tutsa language

Religion
- Christianity, Animism, Hinduism

Related ethnic groups
- people, Tangsa, Nocte

The Tutsa people, also known as the Tutsa, are a Tibeto-Burmese ethnic group inhabiting the western parts of Changlang and Khimiyong circles and the eastern part of Tirap districts of the Northeast Indian state of Arunachal Pradesh. Ethnically, the Tutsa are closely related to the Tangsa and were classified as members of the Tangsa in all census records until 1981. As of 2001 their population stood at 25,000.

== Culture and beliefs ==
Along with the Tangsa, the Tutsas believe in the existence of a supreme being called 'Rangfrah'. The harvest festival of Pongtu Kuh is the principal festival of the Tutsa. The festival is marked by several events like practising of Rom-Hom, a traditional chicken sacrifice for producing fire by rubbing a bamboo stick in the hay to forecast whether the year would prove prosperous for them or not.

The Tutsa are traditionally followers of Animism. Some Tutsa have also embraced Christianity. The sizeable Christian Tutsa community have formed the Tutsa Baptist Churches Council (TBCC).
