= Muklom tribe =

Sub-tribe of Tangsa Naga People

Total population
- 15,000 (2011 census)

Regions with significant populations
- India (Arunachal Pradesh)

Languages
- Hindi

Religion
- Rangfraism, Hinduism, Christianity

The Muklom sub-tribe is a subgroup of the Tangsa community, predominantly residing in the Khimyang and Kharsang circles of Arunachal Pradesh, India.
