= Chi Village =

Chi Chi Chingkhanhoa
- Village
- Location of Chi Chi (India)
- Coordinates: 26.690°N 94.992°E
- Country: India
- State: Nagaland
- District: Mon
- Elevation: 1,071 m (3,514 ft)

Population (2011)
  - Total: 1,588

Languages
  - Official: English
- Time zone: UTC+5:30 (IST)
- PIN: 798621
- Vehicle registration: NL-04
- Sex ratio: 1000♂/1045♀
- Website: nagaland.nic.in

Chi Village is a village in India located about 7 kilometres (4.3 mi) away from Mon District headquarter, Mon Town, in Nagaland, India. Chi is also called as Chizu Chingkhanhoa. Chi is one of the oldest villages in Nagaland. It is administered by the Village Council headed by its chairman (Sarpanch).

== History ==
=== The Origin of Chi ===
The people of Chi is said to have arrived from Alamkaphen Longphangphenyu (Chi dialect; referring to the west) via Taphi river led by Ahng and settled at Menchinghoa (a hill/mound which they believed that did not submerge during the forty days and nights floods at the time of Noah) and the village was called Menshong Chi. After one or more centuries in Menchinghoa the Chi people went to Guhchingpang (present Chi Guhching village) and there the village was called Longgeam Guhching Chi. They settled in Guhchingpang for a few centuries, and they shifted to the present village – Chi Chingkhanhoa. They felt that they found the right place for the settlement of the village, and it has been many centuries since the Chi as a village settling there. Though there is no written record or any other remains or Archaeological evidence like any other history, the history of Chi has been coming down from generation to generation by the words of mouth and it is said that the Chi village is one of the oldest villages of the Konyaks. A saying in Chi dialect, "Kuh to hon not shong to yao no Chingkhanhoa". Translation, "Chi is a village which teaches the east and advises the West".

== Demographics ==
Chi is a medium-sized village located in Mon Sadar Circle of Mon district, Nagaland with total 273 families residing. The Chi village has population of 1588 of which 776 are males while 812 are females as per Population Census 2011. In Chi village population of children with age 0-6 is 238 which makes up 14.99% of total population of village. Average Sex Ratio of Chi village is 1046 which is higher than Nagaland state average of 931. Child Sex Ratio for the Chi as per census is 983, higher than Nagaland average of 943.

== Religion ==
All the natives of Chi village are Christians, with most of them Baptists. The village received Christianity in the year 1959 and established its church on 7 June 1959. Therefore, 7 June is always remembered as the birthday of Chi Baptist Church. The Church had its Silver Jubilee in 1984 and Golden Jubilee in 2009. The church also plays a vital role in the functioning of the village.

== Education ==
In 2011, literacy rate of Chi village was 63.48% compared to 79.55% of Nagaland. In Chi, male literacy stands at 69.82% while female literacy rate was 57.49%.

=== Educational Institutions at Chi ===
1. Wangkhao Government College
2. District Institute of Education and Training at Goching village
3. Industrial Training Institute near Wangkhao Government College
4. Government Primary School at Papong
5. Government Primary School at Chi
6. Edith Douglas School, Mon
7. Cornerstone School
