= TVT =

TVT may refer to:

== Television ==
- TVT (TV station), a Tasmanian television station
- KTVT, a television station serving Dallas–Fort Worth metroplex
- Television of Thailand, the national television broadcaster in Thailand
- Togolese Television, the state broadcaster of Togo
- TV Tonight, an Australian media website

== Other uses ==
- TVT Records, an American record label
- Tension-free vaginal tape
- That Vegan Teacher, Canadian animal rights activist
- Tiruvottiyur railway station, in Chennai, Tamil Nadu, India (station code)
- Transmissible venereal tumour
- Tutsa language
- Tuvalu Time, the time zone of Tuvalu
- TV Tropes, a wiki about common practices in media
