= Ganyo =

- Village
- Location in Burma
- Coordinates: 26°34′33″N 95°12′19″E
- Country: Burma
- Region: Sagaing Region
- District: Naga Self-Administered Zone
- Township: Lahe Township
- Time zone: UTC+6.30 (MST)

Ganyo is a village in Lahe Township, Naga Self-Administered Zone, in the Sagaing Region of northwestern Burma. It is located in the Naga Hills near the border with India.
