= UMN =

UMN may refer to:

- Makyan language, a Tibeto-Burman of Burma
- Multimedia Nusantara University (Universitas Multimedia Nusantara)
- United Mission to Nepal
- University of Minnesota
- UMN MapServer by the Open Source Geospatial Foundation
- Upper motor neuron
- Uspekhi Matematicheskikh Nauk (Russian: Успехи математических наук), a journal translated into English as Russian Mathematical Surveys
