= Rangfrah =

"God" in the Tangsa, Tutsa languages

Rangfraa is synonymous to the term God in Tangsa, and Tutsa languages. The followers of Rangfraa are called “Rangfraites”. The idea behind “Rangfraism” is to bring about an inner transformation in an individual through understanding of self, aided with spiritual practices. The place of spiritual practice is called “Rangsowmhum”.

The idol placed in “Rangsowmhum” is the symbolic representation of “Fraa”. “Fraa” is the depiction of ideal human being or God in human form as per the mythologies of Tangsa and Tutsa communities. The path to reach “Fraa”, the enlightened, the liberated soul is called “Rang-lam”, (meaning “Dharma” in Hindi).

Rangfraism attempts to attain world peace through attaining individual peace. The understanding is, to bring peace in a society people should be peaceful internally first. To be peaceful one has to completely understand life, own self and nature. According to Rangfraism understanding should be supported by logic and reasoning, be it spiritual or material. In place of “believing in God” Rangfraism chooses to understand God.

Rangfraa is the substance of all substances, source of all sources, the pure consciousness, self effulgent, all transcending, the prime mover that pervades the whole cosmos. According to Rangfraism everything is manifestation of Rangfraa. There is no creation. Things manifest, sustain and dissolve back to the source i.e., Rangfraa.

Rangfraism highlights the value of human life, human life being fragile and short lived must be valued the most. Time being the expression of God, a fragment of it as human life is the most beautiful. Individual who accepts his/her life by surrendering to Rangfraa meaning to align with the laws of nature finds peace and ultimate freedom, an experience worth experiencing, a life worth living.

Rangfraism is an attempt to bring all the people with different faiths, nationalities, creeds and races together for just being a human, a lone rational being in this vastness of universe.

Rangfraism is promoted by “Rangfraa Faith Promotion Society”, an organisation based in Changlang, Arunachal Pradesh, India.

== See also ==
- Arunachal Pradesh
- Tribal religions in India
- Donyi-Polo
- Jairampur
- Kharsang
- Tangsa
