= Mon, Nagaland =

Mon
- Town
- Location in Nagaland
- Coordinates: 26°43′14.958″N 95°1′43.048″E
- Country: India
- State: Nagaland
- District: Mon District
- Elevation: 655 m (2,149 ft)

Population (2001)
  - Total: 16,119

Languages
  - Official: English
  - Major language: Konyak
- Time zone: UTC+5:30 (IST)
- PIN: 798621
- Vehicle registration: NL-04
- Website: nagaland.gov.in

Mon (/ˈmɒn/) is a town located in the Mon District of the Indian state of Nagaland.

== Demographics ==
As of 2011 India census, Mon had a population of 16,590 with 9,138 males and 7,452 females. Mon has an average literacy rate of 71%, slightly lower than the national average of 76%: male literacy is 75%, and female literacy is 66%. In Mon, 17% of the population is under 6 years of age.

Most of the inhabitants of the town are Konyaks, with creditable inhabitants of Aos, Phoms and other Naga ethnic groups.

== Geography ==
Mon is located at 26.75°N 95.1°E. It has an average elevation of 655 metres (2,148 feet). It is situated at an altitude of 2,945 ft (898 m) above sea level.

== History ==
Home of the Konyaks, the town was established at the land of Chi and Mon villages. It is centrally located for the coronation of Anghs (chiefs).

== Transport ==
It is at a distance of 357 km from Kohima via Dimapur and 280 km from Dimapur, 275 km from Kohima via Mokokchung, Tamlu and Wakching.
