= Gleadovia =

Scientific classification
- Kingdom: Plantae
- Clade: Tracheophytes
- Clade: Angiosperms
- Clade: Eudicots
- Clade: Asterids
- Order: Lamiales
- Family: Orobanchaceae
- Genus: Gleadovia; Gamble & Prain

Genus of plants

Gleadovia is a genus of flowering plants belonging to the family Orobanchaceae.

Its native range is western Himalaya, Assam (in India) to southern China.

The genus name of Gleadovia is in honour of Frank Gleadow (1856–1930), an English forester and plant collector in India who discovered this plant. It was first described and published in J. Asiat. Soc. Bengal, Pt. 2, Nat. Hist. Vol.69 on page 488 in 1901.

Known species:

- Gleadovia banerjiana Deb
- Gleadovia konyakianorum Odyuo, D.K.Roy & Aver.
- Gleadovia mupinensis Hu
- Gleadovia ruborum Gamble & Prain
