= Ponyo, Lahe =

Ponyo
- Village
- Location in Burma
- Coordinates: 26°15′31″N 95°5′54″E
- Country: Burma
- Region: Sagaing Region
- District: Naga Self-Administered Zone
- Township: Lahe Township
- Time zone: UTC+6.30 (MST)

Ponyo is a village in Lahe Township, Naga Self-Administered Zone, in the Sagaing Region of northwestern Burma. It is located on the border with India and lies at the headwaters of the Namteik Kha river.

The village is inhabited by peoples known as the Ponyo Nagas, which have been dominant in other villages in the area.

Human sacrifice and headhunting has been documented in Ponyo and the headchief of the village has been quoted in the 1920s as saying "we take the heads of human beings because they are the only fit morsels for the Nat".
