= Ponyo language =

Language

Ponyo
- Ponyo-Gongwang
- Native to: Burma
- Native speakers: 4,500 (2008)
- Language family: Sino-Tibetan: Brahmaputran; Konyak; Konyak–Chang? (close to Htangan); Ponyo

Language codes
- ISO 639-3: npg
- Glottolog: pony1234

Ponyo, or Ponyo-Gongwang after its two dialects, is a Sino-Tibetan language spoken in Burma. Ponyo is spoken in 19 villages of Lahe Township, Naga Self-Administered Zone (formerly administered as part of Hkamti District), Sagaing Division, Myanmar (Ethnologue). Dialects are Ponyo and Gongwang, with high mutual intelligibility between the two, both of which share 89% to 91% lexical similarity.

Ponyo is closely related to Leinong and Khiamniungan, sharing 69%–75% lexical similarity with the former, and 67%–73% with the latter.

Alternate names include Gongvan, Gongwang, Gongwang Naga, Manauk, Mannok, Ponyo, Ponyo Naga, Pounyu, Saplow, Solo, Tsawlaw (Ethnologue).

== Dialects ==
Ethnologue lists two main dialects.

- Ponyo (Manauk, Mannok, Ponnyio, Pounyu)
- Gongwang (Gongvan, Saplo, Saplow, Solo, Tsaplo, Tsawlaw)
