= Konyak languages =

Sino-Tibetan language branch of India

Konyak
- Konyakian
- Geographic distribution: India
- Linguistic classification: Sino-Tibetan: Tibeto-Burman; Sal; Konyak
- Proto-language: Proto-Northern Naga
- Subdivisions: Konyak–Chang; Tangsa–Nocte

Language codes
- Glottolog: kony1246

The Konyak languages, also known as the Konyakian, Northern Naga, or Patkaian languages, is a branch of Sino-Tibetan languages spoken by various Naga peoples in southeastern Arunachal Pradesh and northeastern Nagaland states of northeastern India. They are not closely related to other Naga languages spoken further to the south, but rather to other Sal languages such as Jingpho and the Bodo-Garo languages. There are many dialects, and villages even a few kilometers apart frequently have to rely on a separate common language.

Proto-Northern Naga, the reconstructed proto-language of the Konyak languages, has been reconstructed by Walter French (1983). The linkage of the Konyak and Jingphaw languages with Boro–Garo languages suggests that Proto-Garo-Bodo-Konyak-Jinghpaw, which is Sal-speaking people also known as Brahmaputran-speaking people, entered Assam from somewhere to the northeast. It has been proposed that the Proto-Garo-Bodo-Konyak-Jinghpaw language was a lingua franca of different linguistic communities, not all of whom were native speakers, and that it began as a creolized lingua franca.

== Languages ==
Konyak–Chang:

- Konyak
- Chang
- Wancho
- Phom
- Khiamniungic
  - Khiamniungan
  - Leinong
  - Makyam
  - Ponyo

Tangsa–Nocte

- Tangsa (Tase)
  - Muklom
  - Pangwa Naga
  - Ponthai
  - Tikhak
- Nocte
- Tutsa

Ethnologue 17 adds Makyam (Paungnyuan), while Glottolog adds a Khiamniungic branch within the Konyak-Chang branch. Makyam is most closely related to Leinong (Htangan) (Naw Sawu 2016:6).

== Classification ==
Below is a classification of the Konyak languages by Hsiu (2018) based on a computational phylogenetic analysis.

- Konyak
  - Makyam
    - Kuku Nokkone
    - Makyam, Khale, Santung
  - Nuclear Northern Naga
    - Khiamniungic group
      - Leinong
        - Anbaw, Hwi Thaik
        - Wan Ton Tha Mai
        - Nok Nyo Kha Shang
        - Lahe (subgroup): Lahe, Khamti, Long Kyan Nok Kone
      - Ponyo-Gongwan
        - Ponyo (subgroup): Ponyo Nok Inn, Lang Kheng
        - Gongwan
      - Khiamniungan
    - Konyak-Wancho-Tangsa
      - Konyak-Wancho
        - Lao
        - Konyak
        - Kyan
        - Wancho
          - Wancho (Lower Wancho Hill)
          - Wancho (Upper Wancho Hill), Karyaw
          - Chuyo, Gaqkat
        - Phom
        - Chang (?)
      - Tangsa
        - Tikhak (subgroup): Tikhak, Longchang, Yongkuk, Muklom
        - Jugli
        - Shangvan (subgroup): Shangvan, Meitei, Haqcyeng, Ngaimong
        - Pangwa (subgroup): Kyahi, Mungre, Shanke, Chamchang, Lochang, Dunghi, Moshang, Rera, Lungri, Cholim
        - Halang (subgroup): Lama, Halang, Haqkhi, Bote
        - Ringkhu (subgroup): Gaqyi, Shokrang, Henching, Rasa, Lakki, Ringkhu, Khalak, Shangti, Lungkhi, Kochung
        - Gaqha
        - Kotlum (subgroup): Kotlum, Raqnu, Aasen, Drancyi, Gaqlun
        - Kon-Pingku (subgroup): Kon, Pingku, Nyinshao
        - Sansik
        - Champhang (subgroup): Nahen, Thamkok, Lumnu, Champhang
        - Nocte-Tutsa (subgroup): Haqkhun, Tutsa, Ponthai, Hawi, Nocte, Haqsik, Haqchum, Yangno, Haqman

Phom belongs to the Konyak-Wancho branch. Chang may have originally been a Konyak-Wancho language that was heavily influenced by Ponyo-Khiamniungan-Lainong. The homeland of Konyak languages is placed in the Lahe Township area.

== Bibliography ==
- Stirn, Aglaja, and Peter van Ham. 2003. The hidden world of the Naga: living traditions in Northeast India and Burma. Munich: Prestel.
- Saul, Jamie D. 2005. The Naga of Burma: Their festivals, customs and way of life. Bangkok, Thailand: Orchid Press.
- van Dam, Kellen Parker 柯禕藍. 2025. On the independence of tonogenesis in Northern Naga branches with new evidence from Khiamniungan. 58th International Conference on Sino-Tibetan Languages and Linguistics (ICSTLL 58), 3–5 September 2025, University of Bern.
- van Driem, George. 2001. Languages of the Himalayas: An Ethnolinguistic Handbook of the Greater Himalayan Region. Brill.
