= Changlang district =

- District of Arunachal Pradesh
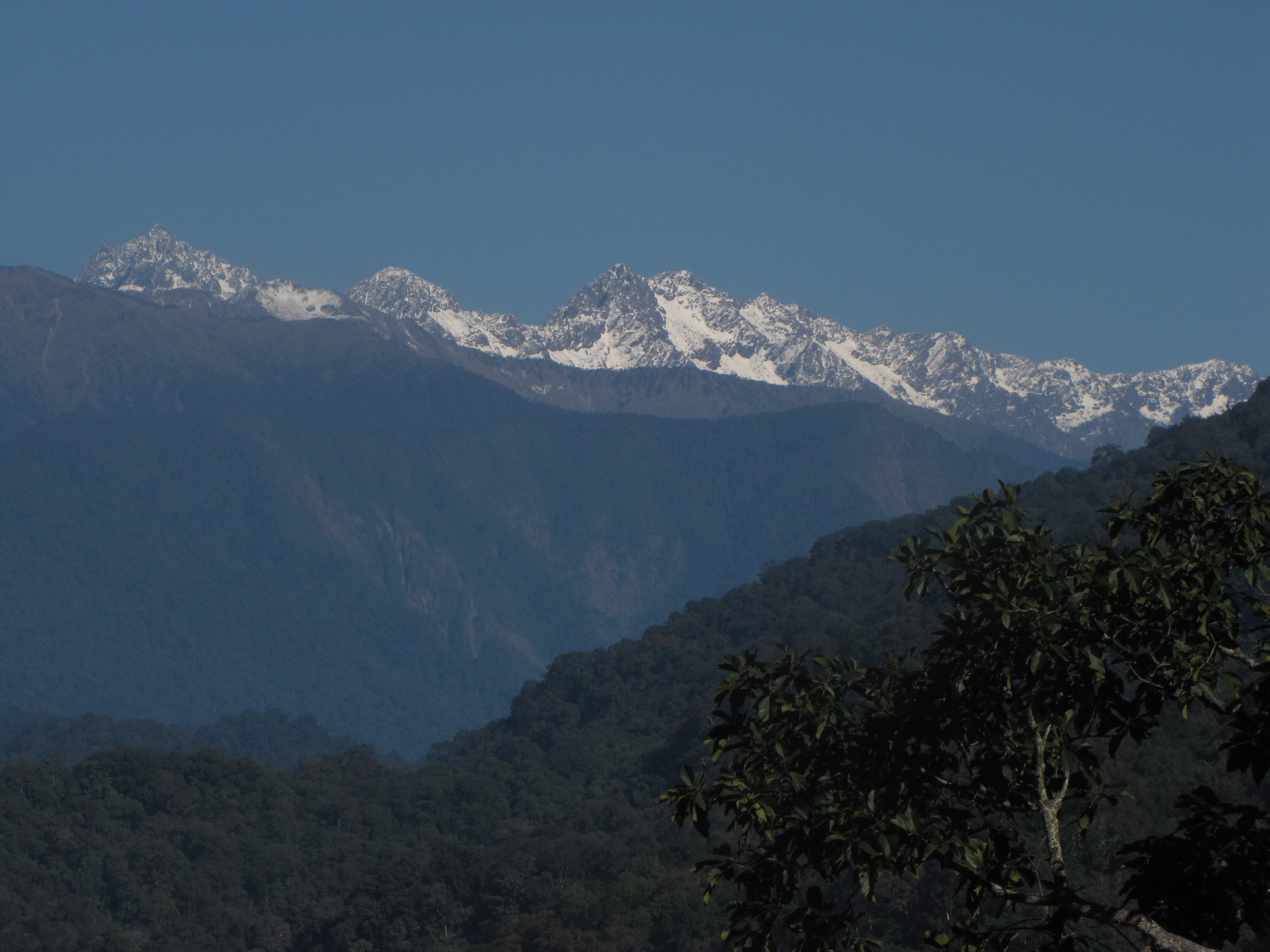
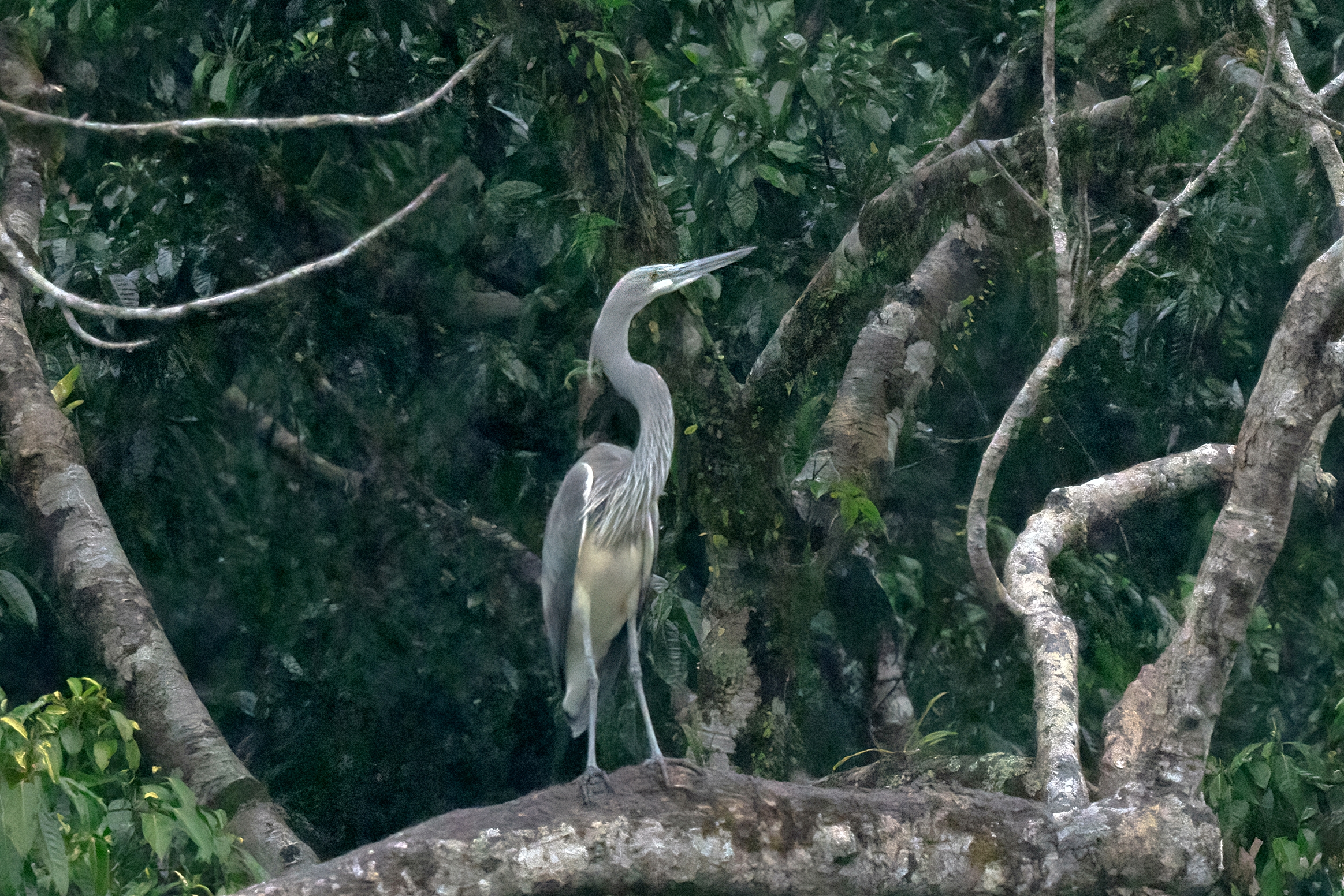
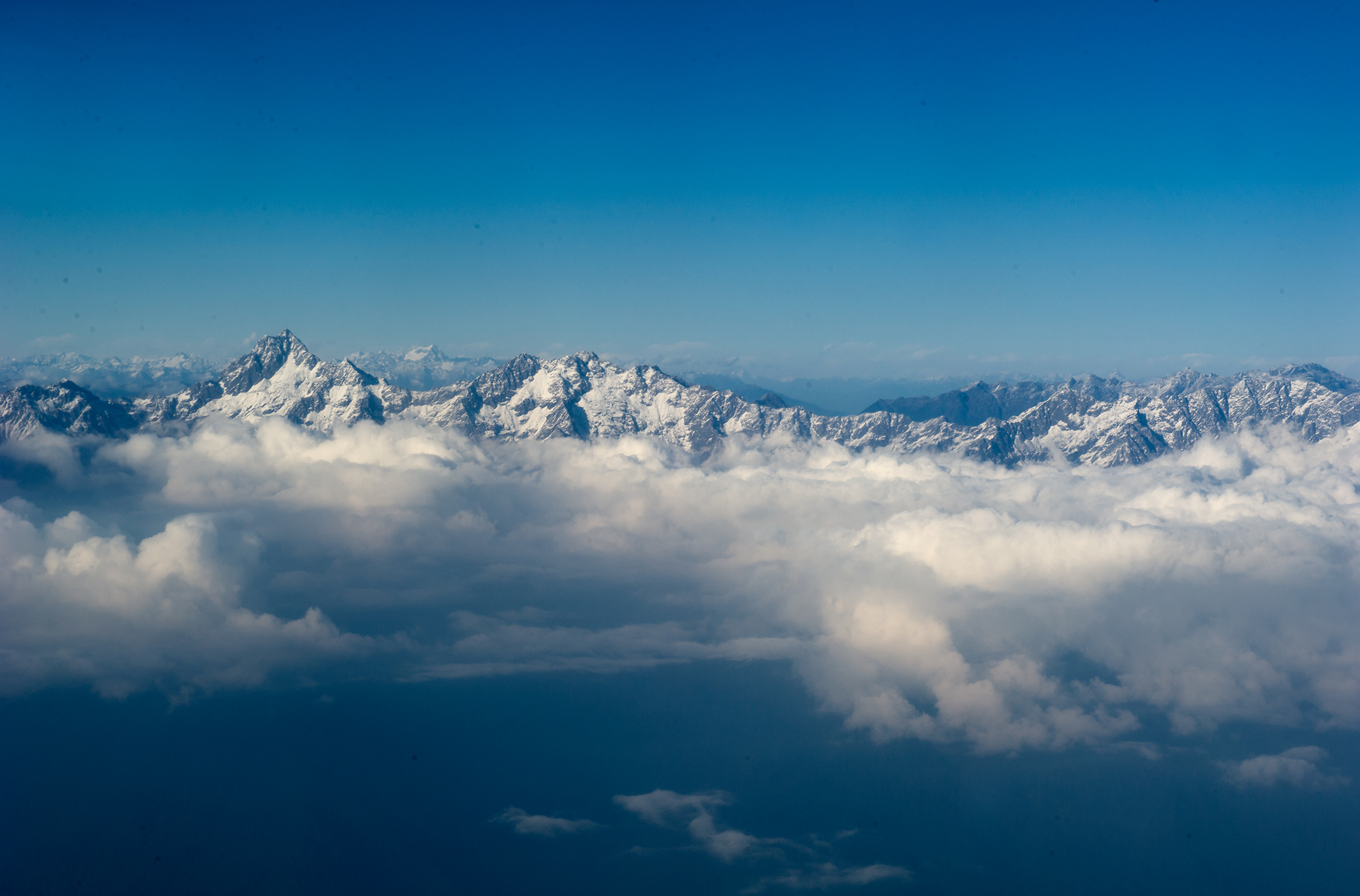

- Location in Arunachal Pradesh
- Coordinates (Changlang): 27°07′48″N 95°44′24″E
- Country: India
- State: Arunachal Pradesh
- Division: Arunachal East
- Headquarters: Changlang

Area
  - Total: 4,662 km^{2} (1,800 sq mi)

Population (2011)
  - Total: 148,226 (2,011)
  - Density: 31.79/km^{2} (82.35/sq mi)

Demographics
  - Literacy: 61.9%
  - Sex ratio: 914
- Time zone: UTC+05:30 (IST)
- Pincode(s): 792 120
- Website: changlang.nic.in

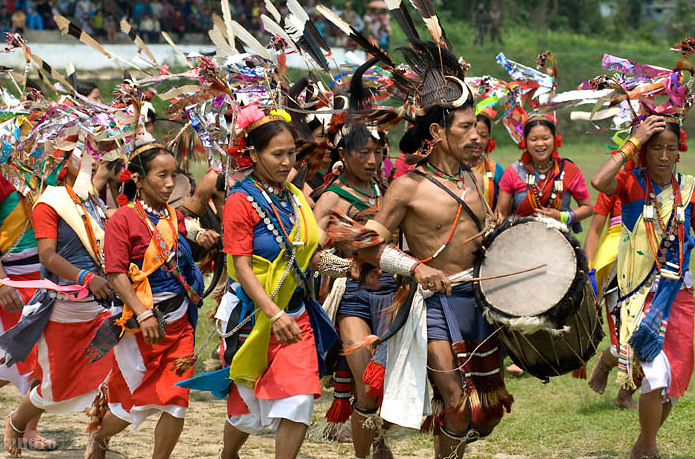
Tutsa Dancers from Changlang District

Changlang district (/tʃæŋˈlæŋ/) is a subdivision of the Indian state of Arunachal Pradesh, located south of Lohit district and north of Tirap district. Naga people reside here. As of 2011 it is the second most populous district of Arunachal Pradesh (out of 16) after Papum Pare. It has become one of the major districts in the area owing to the presence of crude oil, coal and mineral resources in addition to tourism and hydropower.

== History ==
The plains, foothills and lower hills of the district were part of the Chutia kingdom while the higher hills were inhabited by the Tangsas and the Tutsa people. The plains fell into Ahom rule in 1524 and a new position Thaomung Bo-klang (Hatkhowa Gohain) was created to administer the plains region and manage the salt mines, with headquarters at Mohong region. The district was created on 14 November 1987, when it was split from Tirap district.

The Indian Government resettled many Chakmas and Hajong. They had fled from East Pakistan, which constructed the Kaptai Dam on their lands displacing hundreds of thousands.

== Geography ==
Changlang district occupies an area of 4,662 square kilometres (1,800 sq mi), comparatively equivalent to Indonesia's Lombok Island.

It falls in a region that receives high rainfall. The region is rich in wildlife with a different kind of flora and fauna. The district has both plains and highlands. Most of the plains are in the valley of Dihing. The area is prone to occasional floods.

=== National protected area ===
- Namdapha National Park

== Economy ==
The Dihing river is the main source of fish for the local people. The freshwater fish are very much in demand they hardly reach major towns nearby like Tinsukia, Doomdooma, Digboi and Dibrugarh.

== Administrative divisions ==
There are 5 Arunachal Pradesh Legislative Assembly constituencies located in this district: Bordumsa, Miao, Nampong, Changlang South and Changlang North. All of these are part of Arunachal East Lok Sabha constituency.

The Changlang district has five Sub-Divisions namely Changlang, Manmao, Jairampur, Bordumsa, and Miao.

Changlang Sub-Divisions (Chanlang Block) covers four circles, namely Changlang (14,718 people), Khimiyang (3,506 people), Namtok (3,085 people) and Yatdam.

Manmao Sub-Division (Manmao Block) covers three Circles, namely Manmao (3,814 people), Renuk, and Lyngok-Longtoi.

Jairampur Sub-Division (Nampong Block) covers three Circles, namely Nampong (4,424 people), Jairampur (7,836 people) and Rima-Putak.

Bordumsa Sub-Division (Bordumsa-Diyun Block) has got only two circles Bordumsa (25,369 people) and Diyun (28,907 people).

And Miao Sub-Division (Khagam-Miao Block) covers three circles namely Miao (20,266 people), Kharsang (9,509 people) and Vijoynagar (3,988 people).

Total, there are fifteen Circles, five Blocks, and five Subdivisions in Changlang district.

There are two municipalities Changlang (6,469 people) and Jairampur (5,919 people).

The administrative setup is based on single-line administration which aims to keep close co-operation amongst various developmental departments with the district administration and thus, to work together for the speedy development of the area. The district has four Sub-Divisions and a total of 12 circles as shown in Table 2.1 below. The Deputy Commissioner is the overall in-charge of the district administration maintains law and order with the help of administrative officers and police forces. Moreover, the villagers have their own customary administrative systems in the form of traditional village councils consisting of the Gaon Buras and members.

== Transport ==
Trans-Arunachal highway connects northern parts of the district with Namsai district in the north. Changlang headquarters is connected to Assam by Changlang-Margherita road and to Tirap district by Trans-Arunachal Highway.

The 2,000-kilometre-long (1,200 mi) proposed Mago-Thingbu to Vijaynagar Arunachal Pradesh Frontier Highway along the McMahon Line, (will intersect with the proposed East-West Industrial Corridor Highway) and will pass through this district, alignment map of which can be seen here and here.

== Demographics ==
Historical population
Year	Pop.	±% p.a.
1961	18,227	—
1971	41,474	+8.57%
1981	62,211	+4.14%
1991	95,530	+4.38%
2001	125,422	+2.76%
2011	148,226	+1.68%

According to the 2011 census Changlang district has a population of 148,226, roughly equal to the nation of Saint Lucia.

This gives it a ranking of 598th in India (out of a total of 640 districts). The district has a population density of 32 inhabitants per square kilometre (83/sq mi). Its population growth rate over the decade 2001–2011 was 17.96%. Changlang has a sex ratio of 914 females for every 1000 males, and a literacy rate of 61.9%. Scheduled Tribes made up 36.3% of the district's population.

The largest group in the state are the Chakma and Hajong who were settled in the region after their home in the Chittagong Hill Tracts was flooded by the Kaptai Dam. They make up around a one-third of the district's population. Another third is made up of tribal groups, namely Tangsa, Tutsa, Nocte, Chakma, Singpho, Galo, Gorkha and the Yobin. Sizeable communities of the Tibetans, and Bodo are also there.

The Tibetan people are clustered at Choephelling Tibetan settlement in Miao, which was set up in 1976 hosts a population of 2200.

=== Languages ===
Languages by percentage of speakers
Language	Number of Speakers	Percentage
Chakma	40,225	27.14%
Tangsa	39,303	26.52%
Hindi	14,900	10.05%
Nepali	10,511	7.09%
Assamese	5,183	3.50%
Bengali	4,779	3.22%
Singpho	3,965	2.67%
Monpa	3,295	2.22%
Yobin	2,979	2.01%
Hajong	2,658	1.79%
Nocte	2,452	1.65%
Ao	1,716	1.16%
Deori	1,450	0.98%
Khamti	1,266	0.85%
Adi	1,136	0.77%
Others	12,408	8.37%

At the time of the 2011 census, 27.14% of the population spoke Chakma, 20.08% Tangsa, 7.09% Nepali, 3.97% Sadri, 3.50% Assamese, 3.26% Hindi, 3.22% Bengali, 2.22% Monpa, 2.04% Bhojpuri, 1.79% Hajong, 1.65% Nocte and 1.13% Chungli Ao as their first language. Other significant languages in the district not recorded in the census are Singpho, spoken by c. 3900 people.

=== Religion ===
Religion in Changlang district (2011)
Religion	per cent
Buddhism	36.3%
Hinduism	30.1%
Christianity	23.1%
Rangfrah	8.5%
Islam	1.5%

Buddhism, followed predominantly by the Chakmas and the Singphos and Khamti, is the largest religion in the district and is practiced by around a third of the population. Other non-tribal communities, such as the Hajong, Nepalis, Bhojpuris, Assamese and others are Hindus, who make up around 32% of the population. Around half the tribals, including most of the Tangsa, Nocte, and other Naga groups, have converted to Christianity, but a large minority among these groups still practice their traditional animistic faith. Some have attempted to formalize this faith into a new spiritual movement called Rangfrah. Christianity is also practiced among some members of the tea garden tribes like Munda and Kurukh.

== Tourism ==
Places to visit are World War II cemetery in Jairampur, Indo-Myanmar border town Nampong and Pangsau Pass. Another place of interest is Bordumsa where the rich culture of the Tais and Singpho exist. Namdapha National park has many tourist homes & picturesque areas.

== Flora and fauna ==
The Namdapha Tiger reserve is located in Miao town of this district.

== Health services ==
District Hospital is located in Changlang headquarters. Subdivisions and major Administrative circles have Community health Center or Primary health Center to take care of basic health needs.
