= Kharsang =

- town
- Location in Arunachal Pradesh, India Kharsang (India)
- Coordinates: 27.32°N 95.90°E
- Country: India
- State: Arunachal Pradesh
- District: Changlang
- Elevation: 200 m (660 ft)

Population (2001)
  - Total: 9,508

Languages
  - Official: English
- Time zone: UTC+5:30 (IST)
- PIN: 792122
- Telephone code: 91-3807
- Vehicle registration: AR 12
- Nearest city: Tinsukia
- Website: www.changlang.nic.in

Kharsang is a small town located in the Changlang district of Arunachal Pradesh, India. It serves as an administrative sub-division of the district.

The town's economy is primarily based on tea plantations, which serve as the main source of income for the local population. In addition, Kharsang has significant mineral deposits, such as coal and petroleum. Located in the area is the Kharsang Oil Field, operated by GeoEnpro Petroleum Limited, spanning an area of 11 square kilometers.

== Connectivity ==
Kharsang is located in the northeastern part of India. Efforts have been made to enhance Kharsang's connectivity with the rest of the country, despite the challenges posed by its hilly terrain. The primary mode of transportation to and from Kharsang is by road.

There is no direct rail connectivity to Kharsang. The nearest railway station is the Tinsukia railway station in Tinsukia, Assam, which is approximately 100 kilometers away.

The nearest airport to Kharsang is the Dibrugarh Airport located in Dibrugarh, Assam, about 140 kilometers away.

== History ==
The history of Kharsang is intertwined with the larger narrative of Arunachal Pradesh and its diverse ethnic groups. Archaeological evidence indicates human habitation in the region since the Neolithic period. During the British colonial period, Kharsang was a part of the North-East Frontier Agency (NEFA) established in 1914. Following India's independence, NEFA transformed into Arunachal Pradesh, and Kharsang became a part of this newly formed state.

== Geography ==
Kharsang is situated in the easternmost part of India, within the Changlang district of Arunachal Pradesh. It is located in the foothills of the Eastern Himalayas. The climate in Kharsang is predominantly subtropical. The monsoon season, spanning from June to September, brings heavy rainfall, while the winters are mild and the summers warm. This climate supports a variety of flora and fauna, and the town's dense forests are home to several endangered species.

== Demographics ==
The majority of the population comprises the Tangsa tribe, while other ethnic groups also inhabit the town. As per the latest census data, the population of Kharsang is approximately 10,000, with a balanced gender ratio. Multiple languages are spoken in Kharsang, reflecting its ethnic diversity. These languages include Tangsa, Hindi, and English. Despite cultural differences, the residents of Kharsang coexist harmoniously.

== Culture ==
The town is known for its festivals, traditional dances, music and cuisine. Notable festivals in Kharsang include the Tangsa's Mol festival. Traditional arts and crafts, such as weaving and bamboo craft, are also aspects of Kharsang's cultural identity.

== Economy ==
The economy of Kharsang is primarily agrarian, with a significant portion of the population engaged in farming activities. The main crops cultivated in the town include rice, maize, and mustard. Kharsang is also known for its horticultural produce, including local fruits like oranges, pineapples, and bananas. A major contributor to the town's economy is the Kharsang Oil Field, operated by GeoEnpro Petroleum Ltmited. Discovered in the early 1990s, this oil field has brought about significant economic transformation in the region, providing employment opportunities and contributing to the region's revenue.

In recent years, tourism has emerged as another sector in Kharsang's economy. The town's natural environment, culture and biodiversity attract tourists from across the country and beyond.

== Education and Health ==
The town is served by several government and private schools that provide primary and secondary education. The medium of instruction in most of these schools is either English or Hindi, creating a bilingual educational environment.

The town is equipped with a primary health center and several smaller clinics that offer basic medical services to the residents. For specialized treatment, patients often travel to larger healthcare facilities in nearby towns or cities. Public health initiatives led by the government and non-governmental organizations are actively working to improve healthcare access and quality in Kharsang.

== See also ==
1. Changlang District
2. Arunachal Pradesh
3. Tangsa Naga
