= Mon district =

- District of Nagaland
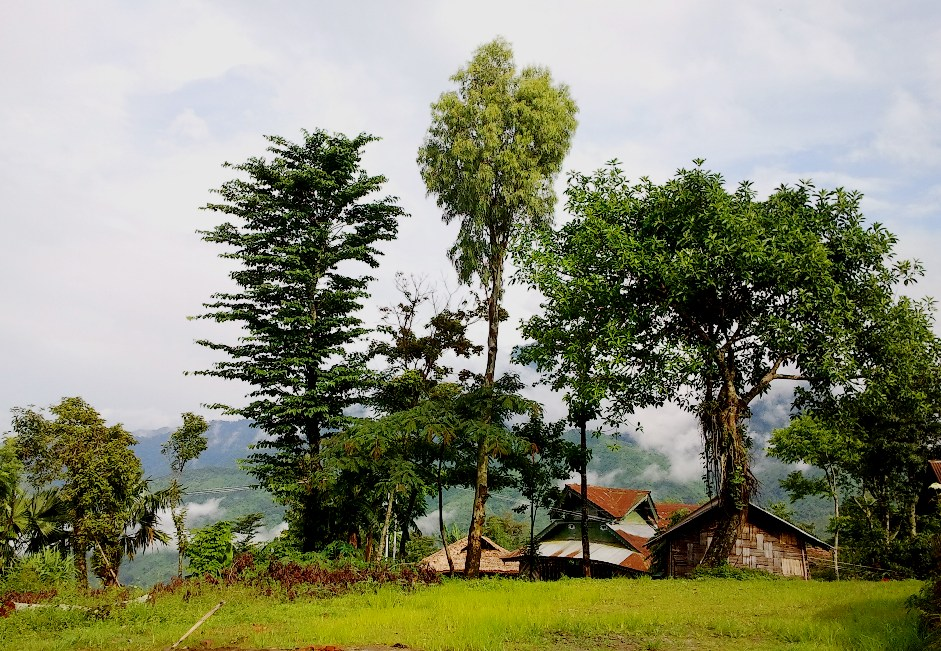
- Shangnyu Village in Mon District
- Nickname: Land of Anghs
- Mon District in Nagaland
- Interactive map of Mon district
- Coordinates: 26°43′14.958″N 95°1′43.048″E
- Country: India
- State: Nagaland
- Headquarters: Mon

Government
  - Lok Sabha Constituency: Nagaland
  - Rajya Sabha MP: Phangnon Konyak, BJP
  - Assembly constituencies: 9 constituencies
  - Deputy Commissioner: Sh. Ajit Kumar Verma. (IAS)

Area
  - Total: 1,786 km^{2} (690 sq mi)

Population (2011)
  - Total: 250,260
  - Density: 140.1/km^{2} (362.9/sq mi)

Demographics
  - Literacy: 56.99%
  - Sex ratio: 899 ♀/ 1000 ♂

Languages
  - Official: English
  - Spoken: Konyak, English
- Time zone: UTC+05:30 (IST)
- PIN: 7986xx
- ISO 3166 code: IN-NL-MN
- Vehicle registration: NL-04
- Major highways: NH 702
- Website: mon.nic.in

Mon district (/ˈmɒn/) is a district of Nagaland, a state in India. It is the second-largest district in Nagaland in terms of area. The district has a population of 250,260 people. Mon Town is the headquarters of the district.

== History ==
After India's independence in 1947, Tuensang was created as a separate administrative centre and in 1952, it became a sub-division of North-East Frontier Agency (NEFA) under a separate Assistant Political Officer. In 1957, the Tuensang subdivision was bifurcated from North-East Frontier Agency and merged into the Naga Hills-Tuensang Area along with three Districts of Kohima, Mokokchung and Tuensang. The present Mon District was carved out of the erstwhile Tuensang District in 1973. The name Mon originates from its district headquarters. Till 1971, the area presently constituting Mon District was a subdivision of Tuensang District.

== Geography ==
Mon District is the northernmost district of Nagaland. It is surrounded by the state of Arunachal Pradesh to its north, Assam to its west, Myanmar to its east, Longleng District to its south-west and Tuensang District to its south. The town of Mon is its district headquarters.

== Economy ==
In 2006 the Ministry of Panchayati Raj named Mon one of the country's 250 most backward districts (out of a total of 640). It is one of the three districts in Nagaland currently receiving funds from the Backward Regions Grant Fund Programme (BRGF).

== Demographics ==
Religion in Mon District (2011)
1. Christianity (94.5%)
2. Hinduism (3.24%)
3. Islam (1.38%)
4. Buddhism (0.50%)
5. Jainism (0.13%)
6. Sikhism (0.03%)
7. Not stated (0.23%)

According to the 2011 census Mon District has a population of 250,260, roughly equal to the nation of Vanuatu. Mon has a sex ratio of 899 females for every 1000 males, and an average literacy rate of 56.99%.

Most of the inhabitants of the district are Konyak Nagas.

=== Culture ===
Mon District is the home of the Konyak Nagas. The Konyaks are famous for their tattooed faces and bodies. The most colourful festival of the Konyaks, Aoling (Aoleng), is observed during the first week of April every year.

Konyaks are the largest ethnic group among the Nagas. They speak the Konyak language, a Sino-Tibetan language, with each village having their local dialect. The Konyaks were the last practising headhunters among the Nagas which continued into the 1960s. Konyaks decorate their houses with skulls, hornbill beaks, elephant tusks, horns and wooden statues.

Konyaks are ruled by hereditary chiefs known as Anghs, and the institution of Anghship is still prevalent among the Konyaks. Every village has an Angh. Some of the smaller villages are ruled over by neighbouring village Anghs. The Angh's house is always the largest in the village, with a display of skulls in the front as a testament to his capability as a leader. Anghs still rule over the villages of Chi, Mon, Shangnyu, Lungwa, Tangnyu, Sheanghah Chingnyu, Jaboka.

Konyaks are adept artisans and skilled craftsmen. They make excellent wood carvings, daos (machetes), guns, gunpowder, head brushes, headgear, necklaces, etc. The older males wear large earrings made of boar horn and a loincloth. Some carry a machete called dao or a gun. The older women wear a short piece of cloth wrapped around their waist only. They carry bamboo baskets on their backs or tie children to their backs with a cloth. The Konyak women are adept in weaving intricate traditional designs and in bead craft. Both men and women wear a lot of traditional beads and brass ornaments. During festivals, the males wear colourful shawls and headgear decorated with feathers, and dance with daos or spears and guns chanting/singing rhythmically. They brew a home-brewed liquor made out of rice. They also farm in the hills by clearing the forests using a method of controlled burning called "Jhum".

The tribe embraced Christianity during the late 20th and early 21st century.

== Tourism ==
=== Places of attraction ===
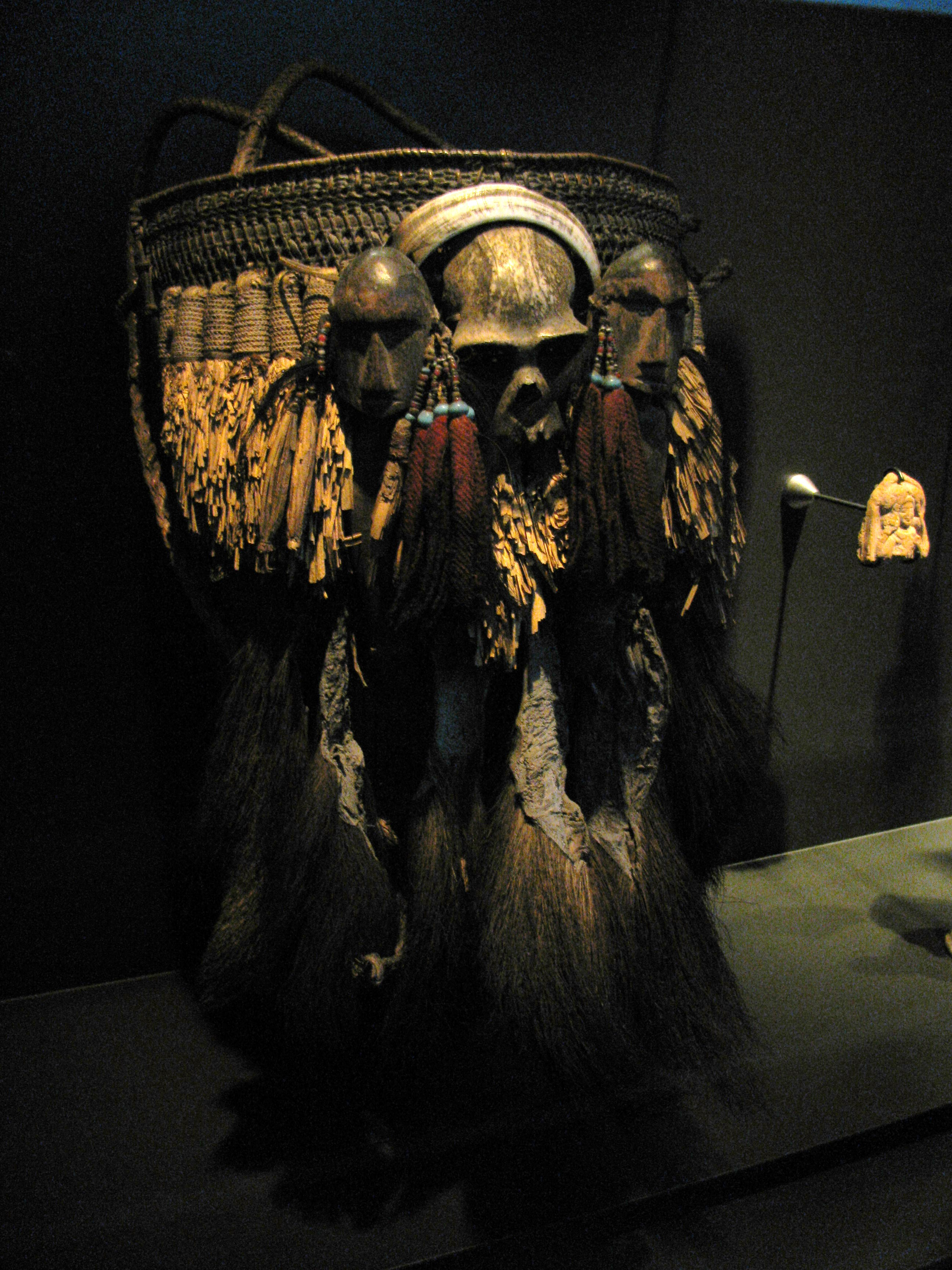
Ceremonial basket of the Konyak Naga

==== Shangnyu Village ====
Ruled by the chief Angh, Shangnyu is one of the prominent villages in Mon District. There is a wooden monument measuring 8 feet in height and 12 feet in breadth – believed to be constructed by heavenly angels. Carvings of human beings and other creatures are engraved on this monument. Memorial stones are also found in front of the Angh's palace. It is believed that there was a friendly trade relationship between the Shangnyu and the Ahom Kings.

==== Chi ====
Chi is another prominent village in Mon district and one of the oldest villages in Nagaland. It is ruled by the Ahng and administered by the Village Council.The Ahng's house is the biggest in the village and has a display of skulls of enemies killed during the head hunting era. The village has three morungs with different wood sculptures and log drums in them.

==== Lungwa ====
Lungwa (Longwa) is one of the biggest villages in Mon District and sits on the India-Myanmar international border. The village has a road connecting it to Loji village in Myanmar's Sagaing Division, that also provides access to the larger Tatmadaw military towns of Lahe and Yengjong in Myanmar. The Lungwa Angh's house is situated in the middle of the border of India and Myanmar. One half of the Angh's house falls within Indian territory, whereas the other half lies under Myanmar control. However, the whole village is controlled by the Angh. He has 60 wives and he rules over 60 villages of the Konyak tribe extending up to Myanmar and Arunachal Pradesh.

==== Veda Peak ====
This highest peak in the Mon District is Veda Peak, which lies approximately 70 km east of Mon. The peak offers a clear sight of both the Brahmaputra and the Chindwin on a clear day. There is a waterfall near the peak which is considered as one of the most beautiful locations in the whole of the Konyak countryside.

==== Naganimora ====
Naganimora, formerly known as Lakhan, is a subdivision in the Mon district. The town lies on the border of Nagaland and Assam. The name of the town is derived from the words "Naga Rani Mora", which mean "the burial place of the Naga queen". It is one of the biggest exporters of coal in Nagaland.

== Transportation ==
=== Air ===
The nearest airport is Dibrugarh Airport in Assam located 122 kilometres from district headquarters Mon. There is a helipad in Mon as well.

=== Rail ===
The nearest railway station is Dibrugarh railway station located 115 kilometres from district headquarters Mon.

=== Road ===
The district is well-connected with roads. The NH 702 passes through the district alongside other intra-district roads.

== See also ==
- Mon
- Singphan Wildlife Sanctuary, wildlife sanctuary in the district.
- 2021 Nagaland killings
