= Tutsa language =

Sino-Tibetan language spoken in India

Tutsa
- Native to: India
- Ethnicity: Tutsa Naga
- Native speakers: (25,000 cited 2001)
- Language family: Sino-Tibetan: Brahmaputran; Konyak; Tangsa–Nocte; Tutsa

Language codes
- ISO 639-3: tvt
- Glottolog: tuts1235

Tutsa is a Sino-Tibetan language spoken in northeastern India. Tutsa is spoken in southern Changlang district and eastern Tirap district of Arunachal Pradesh, as well as Tinsukia district of Assam (Ethnologue). Half of the speakers are monolingual.
