= Konyak people =

Major Naga ethnic group

Konyak Naga
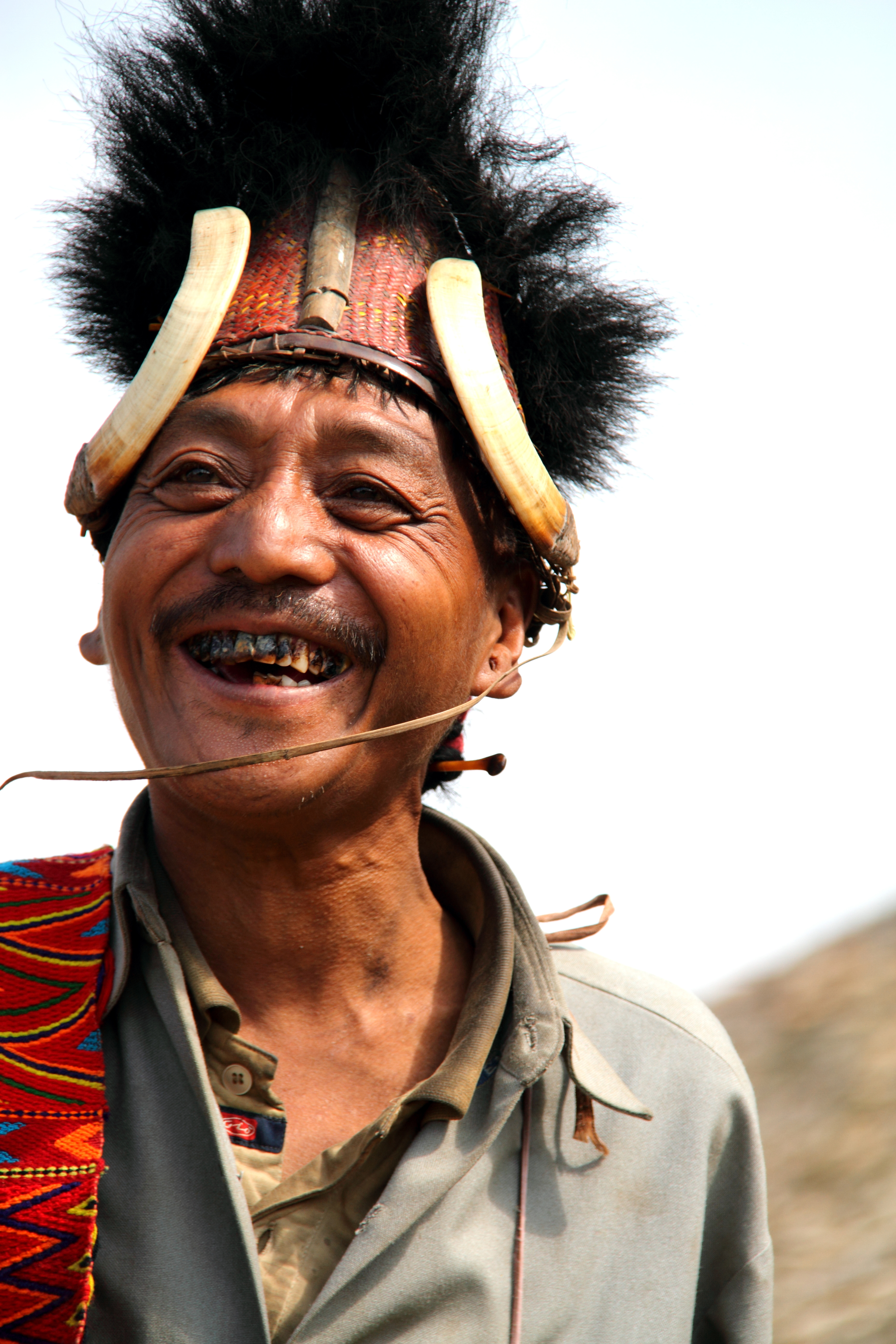
- Konyak chief in traditional outfit

Regions with significant populations
- India
- Nagaland: 237,568
- Assam: N/A
- Myanmar: N/A
- Naga SAZ: N/A

Languages
- Konyak language, Burmese

Religion
- Christianity and Animism

Related ethnic groups
- Wancho, Other Naga Ethnic Groups, Tai Ahom

The Konyaks are a major Naga ethnic group native to the Northeast Indian state of Nagaland. They inhabit the Mon district, which is also known as The Land of the Anghs. The Anghs/Wangs are their traditional chiefs whom they hold in high esteem. Facial tattoos were earned for taking an enemy's head.

== Culture ==
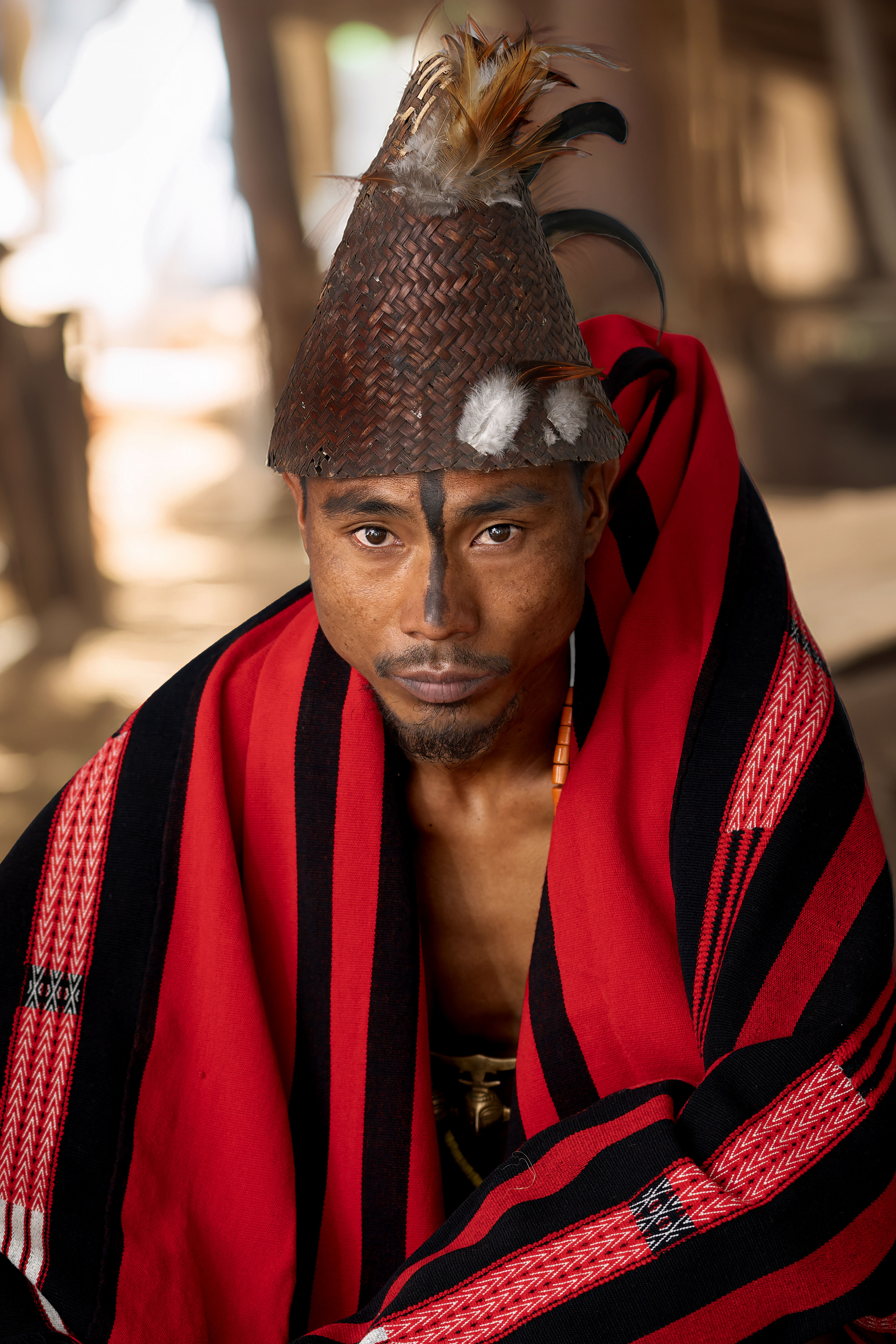
A Konyak man in his traditional outfit

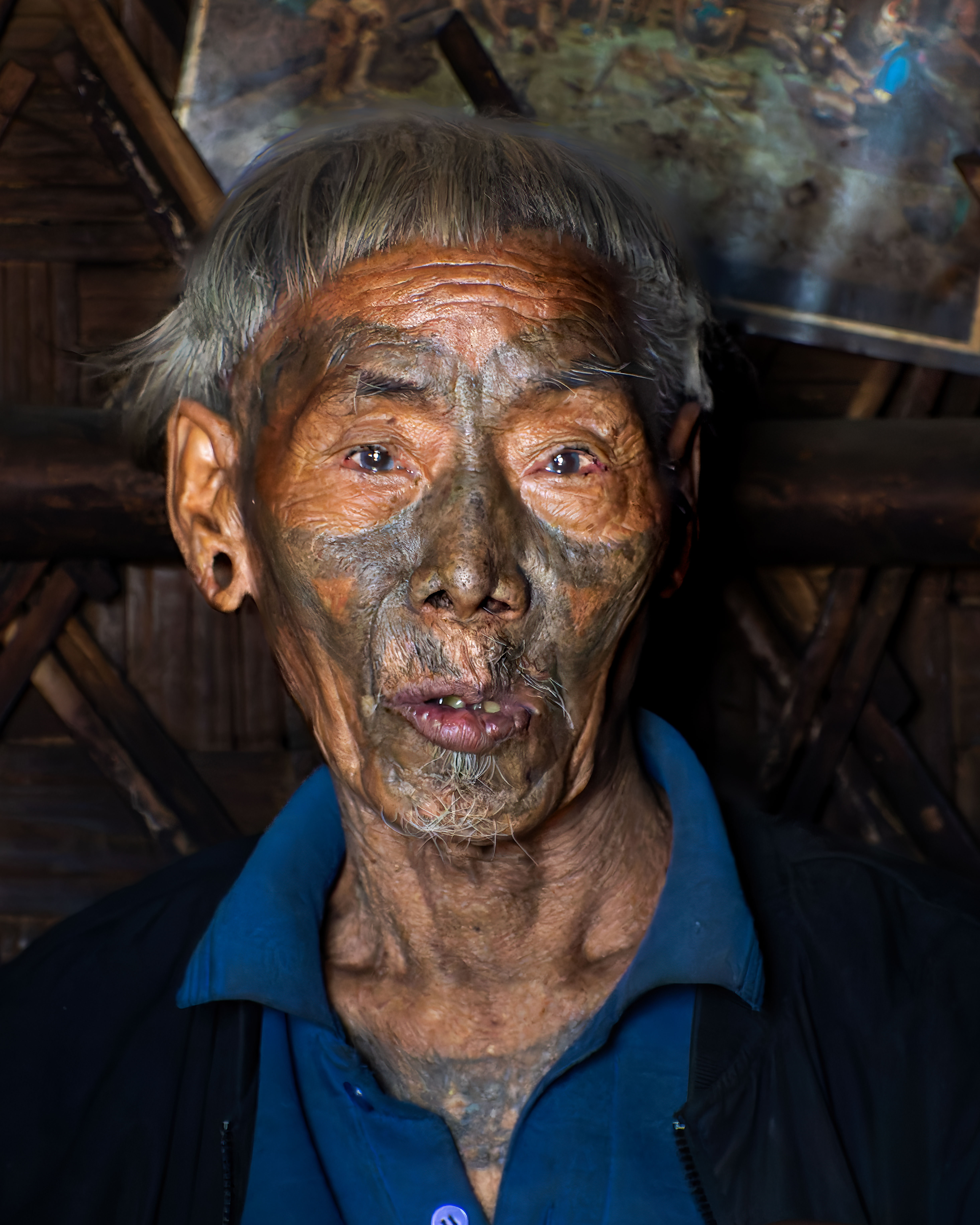
A Konyak man

=== Society ===
The Konyaks are the largest of the Naga ethnic groups. They are found in Tirap, Longding, and Changlang districts of Arunachal Pradesh; Sibsagar District of Assam; and in Naga Self-Administered Zone of Myanmar. They are known in Arunachal Pradesh as the Wanchos ('Wancho' is a synonymous term for 'Konyak'). Ethnically, culturally, and linguistically the Nocte and Tangsa of the same neighbouring state of Arunachal Pradesh, are also closely related to the Konyaks. The Konyaks were the last among the Naga ethnic groups to accept Christianity. In the past, they were infamous for attacking nearby villages, often resulting in killings and decapitation of opposing warriors. The severed heads were taken as trophies and usually hung in the 'baan' (a communal house). The number of hunted heads indicated the power of a warrior. The headhunting expeditions were often driven by certain beliefs, such as code of honour and principles of loyalty and sacrifice.

The ethnic members maintain a disciplined community life with adherence to duties and responsibilities assigned to each of them.

=== Skill ===
Other unique traditional practices that set the Konyaks apart are gunsmithing, iron smelting, brasswork, and gunpowder making. Members of a village were asked to urinate in one particular place for months. Urine contains potassium nitrate and sulphur. The urine-rich soil is then boiled. A black residue floats on top of the water which is collected, dried, mixed with charcoal, and turned into gunpowder. The Konyaks are also known for making excellent machetes and wooden sculptures.

=== Festival ===
Aoleang is a festival celebrated in the first week of April (1–6) to welcome the spring and also to invoke the Almighty's (Kahwang) blessing upon the land before seed-sowing, is the biggest festival of the Konyaks. Another festival, Lao Ong Mo, is the traditional harvest festival celebrated in the months of August/September.

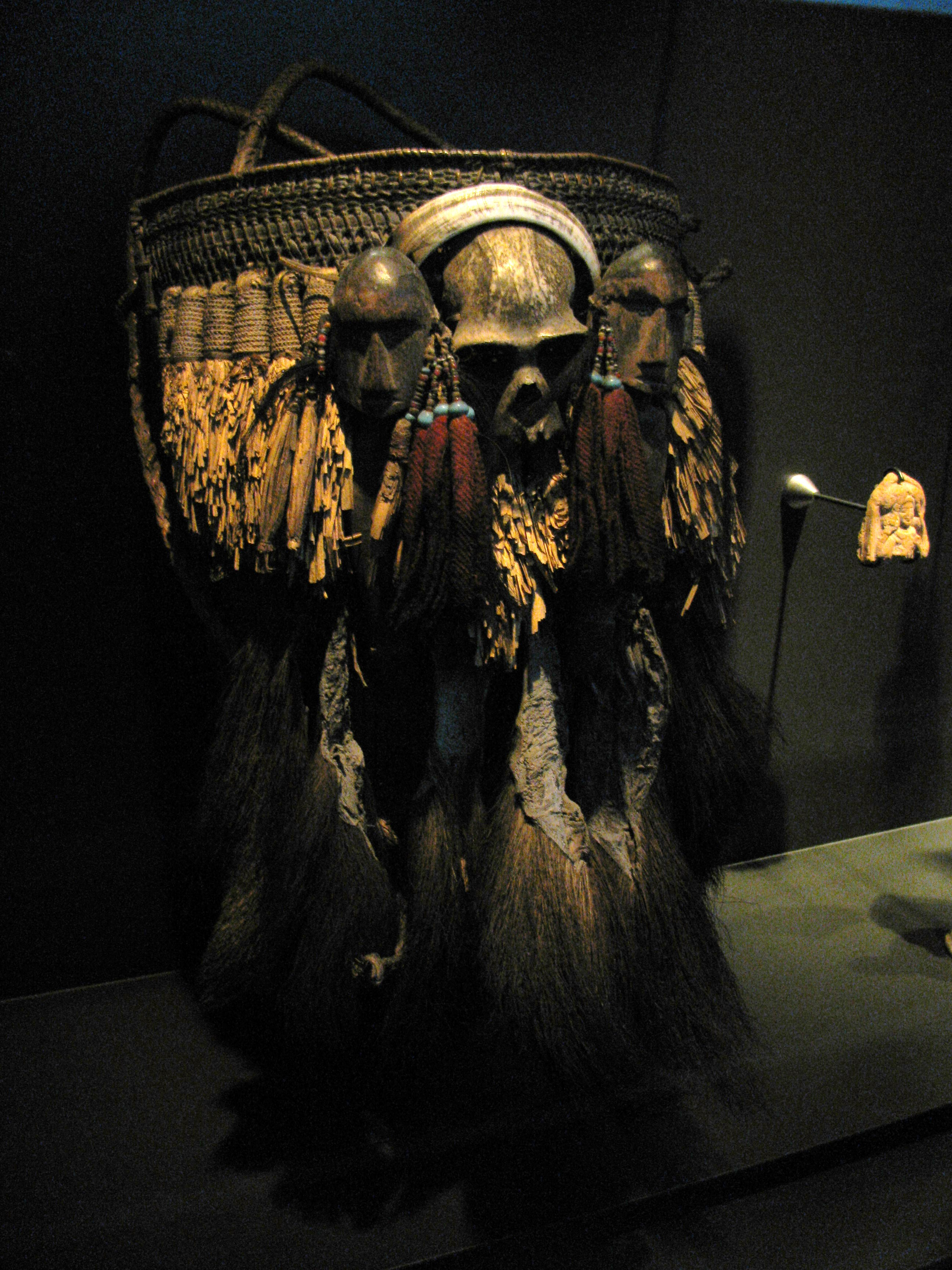
A ceremonial basket of the Konyak tribe with a skull and two human heads carved from wood. This basket is a status symbol.

== Language ==
The Konyak language belongs to the Northern Naga sub-branch of the Sal sub-family of Sino-Tibetan. Konyak language share similarities with Garo and Bodo languages than it is to other Naga languages.

== Notable people ==
- Chingwang Konyak (b. 1943), politician
- N. Bongkhao Konyak (b. 1977), politician
- Phangnon Konyak (b. 1978), politician
- P. Paiwang Konyak (b. 1977), politician
- Noke Wangnao (b. 1948), politician
- W. Wangyuh (b. 1963), politician
