= Lahe Township =

Lahe Township Lahè or Lahaì
- Township
- Location in Naga SAZ

- Location in Sagaing Region

- Location in Burma
- Coordinates: 26°20′N 95°26′E
- Country: Burma
- Region: Sagaing Region
- District: Naga Self-Administered Zone
- Capital: Lahe
- Time zone: UTC+6.30 (MST)

Lahe Township (Burmese: လဟယ်မြို့နယ်) is a township located within the Naga Self-Administered Zone of Sagaing Division, Myanmar. The principal town is Lahe.

== Towns and villages ==
- Anpò
- Ayeching
- Caˈwāng Nuakkong
- Chingnam
- Ganyo
- Hangsen
- Qalaì
- Thàmqò Làngmaˈ
- Thàmqò Nuakkong
- Thàmqo Himphë̄n
- Qāmliō
- Qànguinuak
- Thòngxiān
- Thìmpākuī
- Huìthiˈ
- Huìkë̄m
- Kaˈzò Luàngkaī
- Kaˈzò Muangqui
- Kaˈzò Nuakkong
- Kàmuì Loyì
- Kanangsāt
- Kànuì Langqo
- Kawlum
- Kongiam
- Kūku
- Kyan
- Kyan Langsan
- Lahe
- Lèkùku
- Làcan
- Làngthīng
- Lànghtīng
- Liangdai Nuakkong
- Langdai Nuakin
- Langdai Pongsëù
- Lasām Nawkun
- Lāsām Taklang
- Lāsān
- Launghe
- Lo Nuakkong
- Lo Nuakin
- Luàngëù
- Luàngcan Nuakkong
- Më̀quàlè
- Më̀kolìn/Kāngleī Nuaksëù
- Muanphën
- Miku
- Më̄nthuī
- Muantong Nuaksëù
- Muantong Nuaknyiù
- Nauknyiù Qànxàng
- Nuaknyiù Cë̀thok
- Nuaknyiù Mànxuì (26°31'0"N 95°20'0"E)
- Nuaknyiù Mànxuì (26°26'0"N 95°32'0"E)
- Nuaklō
- Phë̀ntong
- Peigū
- Pāyo
- Pinlein
- Pònyiù
- Ransa
- Sawkkye
- Xikba
- Xiksëù
- Xiknyiù
- Songtāi
- Te-ngan
- Tìmòng
- Saplò
- Saplò Nuakin
- Së̄lō (26°19'0"N 95°9'0"E)
- Së̄lō (26°13'0"N 95°28'0"E)
- Singdu
- Tuithuì
- Vuìliam Nuakong
- Vàntòng
- Yòmdi
- Nyānsëū
- Zōngkuān
- Zu Mawlaw

== Languages ==
The following languages are spoken in Lahe Township.

- Kyan, Karyaw (northwestern part of township, bordering Tirap district, Arunachal Pradesh, India)
- Law (northwestern part of township, bordering Mon district, Nagaland, India)
- Lainong (main town and central part of township)
- Makyan (eastern part of township)
- Tangshang varieties (eastern part of township)
- Ponyo, Gongwang (south-central part of township)
- Khemyungan (southern part of township)
- Makuri (southernmost part of township)

There are 8 Chen Konyak villages in western Lahe Township.
