= Khiamniungan language =

Sino-Tibetan language

Khiamniungan
- Native to: Nagaland, India
- Ethnicity: Khiamniungan
- Native speakers: 61,983 (2011 census)
- Language family: Sino-Tibetan: Brahmaputran; Konyak; Konyak–Chang; Khiamniungic; Khiamniungan

Language codes
- ISO 639-3: kix
- Glottolog: khia1236
- ELP: Khiamniungan Naga

Khiamniungan, also known as Khiamniungan Naga, is a Sino-Tibetan language spoken by the Khiamniungan people in Noklak district of Nagaland, easternmost part of India. The location to be bordering Myanmar in the East, Tuensang to the West, Mon to the North, and Kiphire in the South. There are numerous local tongues varied from village to village or to geographical ranges, such as Patsho, Thang, Peshu, Nokhu and Wolam.

In general, it is divided into two dialect groups, Northern Khiamniungan Naga and Southern Khiamniungan Naga.

== Names ==
Alternate names for Khiamniungan include Aoshedd, Khiamnga, Kalyokengnyu, Khiamngan, Khiamniungan, Nokaw, Tukhemmi, and Welam (Ethnologue).

== Distribution and status ==
There are approximately 50,000 speakers of Khiamniungan. There are an estimated 29 Khiamniungan villages in India and 132 in Burma. "Khiamniungan" is the autonym for the language, which means "the source of water" or "water people", whereas Kalyokengnyu is an exonym meaning "dwelling in stone", given to the group by European anthropologists after the slate roof houses the people lived in. The low number of speakers of Khiamniugan makes it vulnerable, but it is taught in schools and supported by the government through cultural programs.

== Classification ==
Khamniungic fits into the following language branches, as proposed by van Dam & Thaam (2023).

- Patkaian (= Northern Naga)
  - SE Patkaian: Khamniungic, Lainong, Ponyiu-Gongwan, Makyam
    - Khamniungic: Thang, Patsho, Wolam (but not Lainong or Makyam)

== Writing system ==
Like most languages spoken in Nagaland, Khiamniungan is written in a Latin alphabet, due to the early Christian missionary presence in the region.

== History of scholarship ==
Most of the information of Khiamniungan comes from its inclusion in studies of the Naga or Konyak languages by the Central Institute for Indian Languages in Mysore. There is also a Khiamniungan vocabulary published in 1974 by Nagaland Bhasha-Parishad.

== See also ==
- Khiamniungan people
