= Nanyun =

Nanyun နန်းယွန်းမြို့
- Location in Burma
- Coordinates: 26°58′50″N 96°10′5″E
- Country: Myanmar
- Division: Sagaing Region

Population (2005)
  - Ethnicities: Naga
  - Religions: Christianity
- Time zone: UTC+6.30 (MST)

Nanyun (Burmese: နန်းယွန်းမြို့, MLCTS: nan:ywan:mrui., Burmese pronunciation: [náɰ̃jʊ́ɰ̃mjo̰], also spelt Namyun) is a town in the Sagaing Division in Myanmar.
