= Konyak language =

Language

Konyak
- Native to: India, Myanmar
- Ethnicity: Konyak
- Native speakers: 244,000 (2011 India)
- Language family: Sino-Tibetan: Tibeto-Burman; Sal; Konyak; Konyak–Chang; Konyak

Language codes
- ISO 639-3: nbe
- Glottolog: kony1248
- ELP: Konyak Naga

Konyak is a Sino-Tibetan language spoken by the Konyak people in the state of Nagaland, north-eastern India. It is written using the Latin script.

The language has 237,568 speakers in Nagaland (2011 census); most of these (230,522) are in Mon district, with smaller populations in Dimapur (2,869), Kohima (1,873), Mokokchung (943), and Longleng (898). There are also an estimated 2,000 speakers in neighbouring Myanmar, specifically in Hkamti District and in Lahe township.

== Dialects ==
=== Konyak (2021) ===
A list of Konyak dialects from Hoipo Konyak (2021:5) is given below.

- Angphang
- Hopao
- Changnyu
- Chen (8 villages in Lahe Township, Myanmar, and 10 villages in Mon District, Nagaland, India)
- Chingkao
- Chinglang
- Choha
- Gelekidora
- Jakphang
- Kon (spoken in Myanmar)
- Kahyu (spoken in Myanmar)
- Lhongkhai
- Longmein
- Longwa
- Mon
- Mulung
- Nganching
- Sang
- Shanlang
- Shunyuo
- Shenghah
- Sima
- Sowa
- Shamnyuyanga
- Tableang
- Tabu
- Tamkhungnyuo
- Tang
- Tobunyuo
- Tolamleinyua
- Totok

=== Ethnologue ===
Ethnologue lists the following dialects of Konyak.

- Angphang
- Hopao
- Changnyu
- Chen
- Chingkao
- Chinglang
- Choha
- Gelekidoria
- Jakphang
- Longching
- Longkhai
- Longmein
- Longwa
- Mon
- Mulung
- Ngangching
- Sang
- Shanlang
- Shunyuo
- Shengha
- Sima
- Sowa
- Shamnyuyanga
- Tableng (Angwangku, Kongon, Mohung, Wakching)
- Tabu
- Tamkhungnyuo
- Tang
- Tobunyuo
- Tolamleinyua
- Totok
- Hongphoi

Tableng is the standard dialect spoken in Wanching and Wakching.

== Phonology ==
There are three lexically contrastive contour tones in Konyak – rising (marked in writing by an acute accent – á), falling (marked by a grave accent – à) and level (unmarked).

=== Vowels ===
	Front	Central	Back
Close	i	ɨ	u
Mid	e	ə	o
Open		a	

The vowels /a/, /o/ and /u/ are lengthened before approximants. /ə/ does not occur finally.

=== Consonants ===
	Bilabial	Dental/ Alveolar	Palatal	Velar	Glottal
Plosive	p pʰ	t̪	c	k kʰ	ʔ
Nasal	m	n̪	ɲ	ŋ	
Fricative			s		h
Lateral		l			
Approximant	w		j		

The stops /p/ and /k/ contrast with the aspirated /pʰ/ and /kʰ/. /p/ and /c/ become voiced intervocalically across morpheme boundaries. The dental /t/ is realised as an alveolar if preceded by a vowel with a rising tone. The approximants /w/ and /j/ are pronounced laxer and shorter after vowels; /w/ becomes tenser initially before high vowels. If morpheme-initial or intervocalic, /j/ is pronounced with audible friction. /pʰ/, /kʰ/, /c/, /ɲ/, /s/, /h/ and /l/ do not occur morpheme-finally, while /ʔ/ does not appear morpheme-initially. Except for morpheme-initial /kp/ and /kʰl/, consonant clusters occur only medially.

== Bibliography ==
- Nagaraja, K.S. (2010), Konyak Grammar, Mysore: Central Institute of Indian Languages, ISBN 978-81-7342-195-2
