= Lahe, Myanmar =

Lahe လဟယ်မြို့
- Location in Burma
- Coordinates: 26°19′31″N 95°26′34″E
- Country: Myanmar
- Division: Sagaing Region
- Elevation: 3,387 ft (1,032 m)

Population (2005)
  - Ethnicities: Naga
  - Religion: Christianity
- Time zone: UTC+6.30 (MST)

Lahe (Burmese: လဟယ်မြို့) is a town in Naga Self-Administered Zone of Sagaing Region on the north-west frontier of Myanmar.

The Naga New Year festival is held on 15 January, and Lahe, Leshi, Hkamti, and Nanyun hosted it in rotation until it became state-sponsored for the benefit of tourism and was limited to Leshi and Lahe in 2003 during the time of the ousted prime minister Khin Nyunt.

Naga insurgents fighting against the Indian government have bases in the border area inside Burma.

The Burmese army have launched offensives against these camps in recent years following top level meetings between the two countries.
