= Naga Self-Administered Zone =

Coordinates: 26°19′46″N 95°26′41″E

Naga Self-Administered Zone နာဂကိုယ်ပိုင်အုပ်ချုပ်ခွင့်ရဒေသ
- Self-administered zone
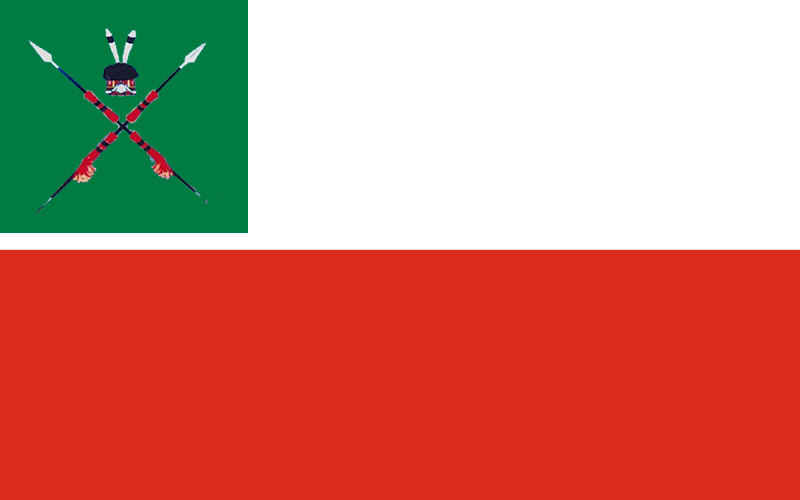
- Flag Seal

- Location in Sagaing region
- Country: Myanmar
- Region: Sagaing Region
- No. of Townships: 3
- Capital: Lahe

Government
  - Chairperson of the Leading Body: Hla Tun

Area
  - Total: 13,329 km^{2} (5,146 sq mi)

Population (2014)
  - Total: 116,828
- Demonym: Naga
- Time zone: UTC+6.30 (MMT)
- Website: Naga Self-Administered Zone

The Naga Self-Administered Zone (Burmese: နာဂကိုယ်ပိုင်အုပ်ချုပ်ခွင့်ရဒေသ [nàɡa̰ kòbàɪɰ̃ ʔoʊʔtɕʰoʊʔ kʰwɪ̰ɰ̃ja̰ dèθa̰]), is a self-administered zone in the Naga Hills area of Sagaing Region of Myanmar. Its administrative seat is the town of Lahe.

== History ==
The Naga Self-Administered Zone was created under the terms of the 2008 Constitution of Myanmar. Its official name was announced by decree on 20 August 2010.

In August 2016, an outbreak of measles caused the deaths of 44 children. The outbreak may have been caused by a lack of measles vaccinations due to poor health infrastructure.

== Government and politics ==
The Naga Self-Administered Zone is administered by the Leading Body of the Naga Self-Administered Zone (LBNSAZ), which consists of at least ten members and includes Sagaing Region Assembly members elected from the Zone and members nominated by the Armed Forces. The Leading Body performs both executive and legislative functions and is led by a Chairperson, currently Hla Tun. The Leading Body has competence in ten areas of policy, including urban and rural development, road construction and maintenance, and public health. Though the region does not lack medical infrastructure, it only had two medical doctors for around 130,000 residents as of May 2020.

== Administrative divisions ==
Townships of Naga SAZ

Lahe
Layshi
Nanyun

The zone of 13,329 km^{2} (5,146 sq mi) is made up of the three townships:

- Lahe 3,941 km^{2} (1,522 sq mi)
- Leshi 2,783 km^{2} (1,075 sq mi)
- Nanyun 6,605 km^{2} (2,550 sq mi)

Subtownship

- Donhee
- Htanparkway
- Mobaingluk
- Pansaung
- Sonemara

The three townships were previously part of the Hkamti District prior to the creation of the Naga Self-Administered Zone.

In 2015, it was proposed that Hkamti and Homalin townships be added to the Naga Self-Administered zone. This was welcomed by ethnic Nagas but came against opposition from other ethnic groups in the townships.

== Demographics ==
The zone was created to be self-administered by the Naga people. Two-thirds of the Naga people in Myanmar are Christian and one-third practice Theravada Buddhism.

In total, nearly one million Nagas divided into 10 tribes live in Burma. But the majority of them live outside the Naga Self-Administered Zone (mostly in Western Sagaing Division). Naga Self-Administered Zone is consisted of a total of 270 villages. According to the Census of 2014, the total population within the Zone is 62,766. However, according to the administration of SAZ, the total population as of 2018 is 127,439.

In terms of ethnicity, out of a total population of 127,439, the majority are Naga (122,239 or 95.9%). Chin (2,893) and Bamar (2,156) are also present in Naga SAZ. As far as religion is concerned, there are 93,188 Christians (73.1%) and 31,969 Buddhists (25.1%). There is a small population of 2,070 (1.6%) who follow traditional religion, mostly in Lahe.

== See also ==
- Naga people
- Naga Hills
- Nagaland, a Naga majority state in India
