= Education in Arunachal Pradesh =

Arunachal Pradesh is gradually improving with several plans and projects being initiated by both state and central government. Furthermore, there are local NGOs in the state who have undertaken several projects to bring about awareness among the people about the importance of literacy on in far-flung areas. The average literacy rate in Arunachal Pradesh is 82.93% as of the latest report for December 2020. This article provides an outline of the Arunachal Pradesh Education system.

== School education ==
School Education in Arunachal Pradesh follows uniform structure of 10+2 system. The primary stage of schooling consists of Standard I to V, the middle stage from Standard VI to VIII and the Secondary Stage comprises Standard IX to X. Classes XI-XII falls under the higher secondary education stage. In order to universalize elementary education in Arunachal Pradesh, state government offers free education to students up to the age of 14. The state is home to a number of Pre-Primary Schools, Primary School, Middle Schools, High Schools and Higher Secondary Schools.

Ramakrishna Mission School, Narottam Nagar, Deomali is one of the most prestigious school in Arunachal Pradesh.

== Higher education ==
Arunachal Pradesh has a few renowned institutes that offer higher education in the state. Among them North Eastern Regional Institute of Science and Technology (NERIST) play a very significant role in raising the technical and management education in the state. In last recent months one more tag of higher education has been attached with the list of institutions of higher education in Arunachal Pradesh named Indira Gandhi Technological and Medical Sciences University and Himalayan University that are established under the UGC act 1956 section 2 f and with Arunachal Pradesh State Assembly Gazette approval. Another premier educational institution in the state of Arunachal Pradesh is Rajiv Gandhi University. Institutes offering higher education in Arunachal Pradesh consist of three universities one deemed university and several recognized professional colleges.

Wangcha Rajkumar Government College, Deomali is the sole college in the southeastern part of Arunachal Pradesh (Tirap and Longding), it is affiliated to this university.

Only the following institutes of higher education are accredited by NAAC (National Assessment and Accreditation Council), in the order of their grade: Jawaharlal Nehru College, Pasighat (Grade A), St Claret College, Ziro (Grade A), Indira Gandhi Govt. College, Tezu (Grade B++), Rajiv Gandhi University (Grade B), National Institute of Technology, Arunachal Pradesh (Grade B), Dera Natung Government College, Itanagar (Grade B), Govt. College, Bomdila (Grade B), Donyi Polo Govt. College, Kamki (Grade B), and Rang Frah Govt. College, Changlang (Grade C).

== Medium of instruction ==
English is the primary medium of instruction in various schools of Arunachal Pradesh. Also the colleges and universities as well as other professional institutes in the state use English as the medium of teaching.

== See also ==
- List of educational institutions in Arunachal Pradesh
