= 2019 Khonsa ambush =

Terrorist incident in India

Khonsa ambush
- Date: 21 May 2019
- Time: 11:30 am (IST)
- Location: Pansumthong village near Khonsa, Tirap district, Arunachal Pradesh, India
- Type: Ambush
- Perpetrator: Suspected NSCN-IM militants
- Deaths: 11
- Injuries: 2
- Accused: Maj Gen Absolon Tangkhul, James Kiwang, and others (accused but not apprehended)

The Khonsa ambush occurred on 21 May 2019, resulting in the death of eleven individuals, including Tirong Aboh, the incumbent MLA of the Khonsa West constituency in Arunachal Pradesh, and his son.

== Background ==
Khonsa West MLA Tirong Aboh, who lost his life in the ambush, had contested and won the assembly elections earlier in the year as a National People's Party (NPP) candidate. He successfully retained his seat, triumphing over his sole rival, Phawang Lowang of the BJP, by a margin of 1,055 votes. Initially elected from the constituency in 2014 on a People's Party of Arunachal ticket, Aboh later joined the Congress during the tenure of former chief minister Nabam Tuki, subsequently serving as a cabinet minister for approximately four months.

== Incident ==
The incident took place when suspected NSCN-IM rebels ambushed Aboh's convoy of four cars, which was en route to his constituency from Assam. Alongside Aboh, the vehicles carried family members, three police personnel, and a poll agent. Altogether, 15 people were in the convoy. The attack occurred near Bogapani village in Arunachal Pradesh around 11:30 am. Unprovoked, militants ambushed the vehicle and fired at it from all sides, killing 11 of the 15 passengers, including Aboh and his son. Among the casualties, two were police personnel. Initial investigations pointed towards the involvement of NSCN militants in the attack, as confirmed by police officials. Aboh, aged 41, was seeking re-election from his constituency, with the election results scheduled for announcement on 23 May.

=== Recorded telephonic conversation ===
The National Investigation Agency (NIA) investigating the ambush has uncovered a recorded telephonic conversation between a worker of the National People's Party and an unidentified militant associated with the insurgent National Socialist Council of Nagaland-Isaac and Muivah (NSCN-IM) faction.

According to a senior official, an unidentified person claiming to be an NSCN-IM leader made a phone call to NPP worker, Noknyiam Nokbi, from Khonsa, in late March 2019. In the recorded conversation, the militant can be heard issuing threats to the NPP worker, warning him to refrain from making statements against the NSCN (IM) or face severe consequences.

The suspected NSCN (IM) leader instructed Nokbi not to organize or participate in any meetings where the late Khonsa West MLA Aboh or his supporters would speak against the insurgent outfit. Additionally, the conversation included references to Jalin Hakhun, one of the 11 individuals who lost their lives in the later ambush. Hakhun, the president of the Dadam Area Youth Association (DAYA), had been actively campaigning for Aboh prior to the assembly election in the state.

=== Attack on NPP workers at Kheti village ===
Later, two NPP workers were targeted by suspected NSCN (IM) militants in an attack at Kheti village in Tirap district of Arunachal Pradesh. The assault, which took place a few days after the alleged threat call in late March, resulted in the death of NPP worker Jaley Anna. On 29 March 2019, several days after the call, at around 09:30 PM, Jaley Anna and another supporter of Tirong Aboh, Khamney Aboh, were abducted from Kheti village by a group of militants. They were dropped back an hour later, severely beaten, and were immediately rushed to the nearest hospital by villagers. Unfortunately, 52-year-old Anna succumbed to his injuries. Before his passing, Anna managed to identify one of his assailants as Eli Ketok, allegedly a member of a militant group. In response to this incident, an FIR was lodged at Khonsa police station by Chathien Anna, Jaley Anna's wife, and NPP District President Noklam Bisai. This incident prompted NPP Chief and Chief Minister of Meghalaya, Conrad Sangma, to express his condolences and emphasize the need for mutual respect in political endeavors.

NPP workers Noknyiam Nokbi and Wangsi Atoa, along with survivors Nyajut Hakhun and Nokliam Tekwa, went under interrogation by the National Investigation Agency (NIA) in relation to both this and event as well as the aforementioned phone call.

== Victims ==
The massacre resulted in the deaths of Khonsa West MLA Tirong Aboh and 10 others. The victims included:

- MLA Tirong Aboh
- Wangngoi Hakhun (35)
- Jalin Hakhun (33)
- Wangngu Hakhun (30)
- Gamwang Hakhun (28)
- Tangro Atoa (47) - Teacher
- Poanhang Agi (38) - Personal Security Officer (PSO)
- Khundong Siksa (50) - Personal Security Officer (PSO)
- Patwang Sumpa (20) - Driver
- Along Aboh - Son of MLA Tirong Aboh
- Matlam Aboh - Nephew of MLA Tirong Aboh

In addition, two individuals sustained injuries and required extended medical treatment:

- Wangdan Hakhun (26)
- Wangsen Hakhun (32)

An additional two occupants of the convoy escaped the massacre unharmed:

- Nokliam Tekwa - Personal Security Officer (PSO)
- Nyajut Hakhun - Household Worker.

Nyajut Hakhun's involvement in the incident has also come under investigation by the NIA.

== Investigation and response ==
In response to the attack, the Indian Army initiated an extensive search operation across the jungles of Tirap, Longding, and Changlang Districts to apprehend the assailants. Additional reinforcements, including Special Forces troops, were deployed for this purpose. The operation also saw the utilization of specialist helicopters with night-flying capability, along with night vision equipment. Reconnaissance helicopters, quad-copters, and tracker dogs were extensively employed in the search. The operation was conducted in close coordination with the police, local administration, and intelligence agencies, aiming to identify and bring to justice those responsible for the incident.

=== Investigation ===
Following the incident, the case was initially under the purview of the state police. However, it was subsequently handed over to the National Investigation Agency (NIA).

=== Involvement of Nyajut Hakhun ===
Nyajut Hakhun, a 22-year-old maid, was one of the four survivors of the ambush. She had been living with the Aboh family for the past four years. Following the incident, there were reports of her going missing for some time. The NIA placed her under house arrest and had reportedly been interrogating her frequently regarding the incident. According to her statements, she was in the last car of the convoy that MLA Aboh was traveling in, and she managed to escape the scene with the help of a passing biker.

However, there have been inconsistencies in her statements, which raised suspicions. When NIA officials searched her room, they discovered both an HDFC Bank debit card and a credit card in her name, with a substantial balance in her account. This led to further scrutiny and speculation about her involvement.

Despite the suspicions, Hakhun has never been charged in relation to the incident.

=== Later developments ===
Posters allegedly released by the NIA revealed the names of additional accused involved in the ambush that resulted in the death of Khonsa West MLA Tirong Aboh, his son, and ten others on 21 May 2019. These posters featured information regarding several NSCN cadres, including self-styled Lt Col Apem, self-styled Captain Ellie Ketok, self-styled 'Kilonser' Ravi Wangno, self-styled Major General Absolon Tangkhul, and self-styled Captain Victor Tangkhul. The NIA announced cash rewards ranging from Rs 2 lakh to Rs 3 lakh for individuals providing information leading to the arrest of the accused.

A few days later, the NIA made a major breakthrough in the case by arresting Yangte Josaham, a self-styled lieutenant of NSCN-IM, and the area commander of the outfit in Arunachal Pradesh's Longding district, from Dimapur, Nagaland, on 16 August 2019. Josaham's arrest is in connection with the killing of Khonsa West MLA Tirong Aboh. The federal agency had registered a case under Sections 302, 307, and 34 of the Indian Penal Code, along with Sections 25(1b) (a), 27 of the Arms Act, and Sections 10,13 of UAPA Act on 10 June, following the state government's decision to hand over the case to NIA. The original case was registered by Arunachal police.

Sources within NIA have stated that, based on reliable information, a joint team of NIA and military intelligence arrested Yangte Josaham during a covert operation. Josaham was subsequently taken to Guwahati for further proceedings.

=== Suspects ===
The National Investigation Agency has offered money for the arrest of Maj Gen Absolon Tangkhul, also known as Rockwang Tangkhul or Baba, who was believed to be one of the masterminds behind the massacre. He resided in Dimapur, Nagaland. Another cash reward of Rs 2 lakhs has been announced for any information leading to the arrest of James Kiwang, who was suspected to be involved in the planning of the attack. Kiwang, a Myanmar national settled in Tirap, was identified as a kilonser and a member of the NSCN-IM's civil wing. Both Tangkhul and Kiwang had been residents of Khonsa but went missing after the massacre. Their residences in Dimapur were subjected to a search operation on 5 March, providing additional leads in the investigation.

Furthermore, the (NIA) has extended cash rewards for the apprehension of three other individuals connected to the NSCN-IM. A reward of Rs 3 lakhs has been announced for the arrest of Captain Victor Tangkhul, a resident of Manipur. Lt Col Apem, who served as a commander of the Samsong battalion in Tizit, Nagaland, is also sought by the NIA, with a cash reward of Rs 3 lakhs for any information leading to his arrest. Additionally, a reward of Rs 3 lakhs has been offered for the arrest of Rabi Wangno, who hailed from Dadam in Tirap District.

=== BJP involvement ===
The NIA has also focused its investigative efforts on an MLA contestant from Khonsa West, Phawang Lowang of the BJP, along with 21 other individuals. Lowang, who contested against the late MLA Tirong Aboh in the 2019 elections, is currently under scrutiny. The extent of his involvement is being examined as part of the ongoing investigation process.

== Public reaction ==
=== Public vigil and protests ===
In response to the ambush, a candlelight vigil was organized by the Arunachal Civil Society (ACS) in Itanagar, the state capital, to express solidarity with the bereaved family members of Khonsa West MLA Tirong Aboh and the ten others who lost their lives. The march garnered participation from diverse sections of society, including various student organizations from the state, such as All Tirap, Changlang, Namsai, and Longding Students' Union, as well as Dera Natung Government College Students' Union and Rajiv Gandhi University Students' Union. The event commenced at the Aakashdeep shopping complex in Itanagar, proceeding with participants carrying placards and chanting slogans. The procession culminated at the Tennis Court in Indira Gandhi Park, where it transformed into a large assembly.

=== Political parties and interest organizations ===
Condemning the attack, NPP president and Meghalaya Chief Minister Conrad Sangma urged the intervention of the Prime Minister's Office and Union Home Minister Rajnath Singh in the matter.

Leaders from various student organizations and ACS strongly condemned the assassination of MLA Aboh, his son, and the others, denouncing it as a cowardly act. They further urged the government to transfer the case to either the Central Bureau of Investigation (CBI) or the National Investigation Agency (NIA) to expedite the apprehension of the perpetrators.

The All Arunachal Pradesh Students' Union (AAPSU) also voiced their concerns over the incident, labeling it a "political murder." They have called for an NIA inquiry into the matter and are planning candlelight vigils across district headquarters in the state to protest against the killings. Additionally, AAPSU has urged both the state and central governments to demonstrate strong political resolve in resolving the persistent insurgency issue in the Tirap, Changlang, and Longding (TCL) region.
