= Miles Bronson =

American missionary (1812 – 1883) in British Assam

- Born: 20 July 1812; New York City, US
- Died: 9 November 1883 (aged 71); Michigan, US

Miles Bronson (20 July, 1812 – 9 November, 1883), was one of the first American Baptist missionaries who worked in the state of Assam in northeastern India.

== Early life ==
Bronson was born in Herkimer County in New York to Deacon Bronson and Rebekah Hall Bronson and was the youngest of five children; he married Ruth Montague Lucas in 1836.

== Mission Work ==
=== Assam ===
In 1835, David Scott, the Agent to the Governor General in the North-East Frontier invited the American Baptist Missionaries working in Burma (now Myanmar) to come to Assam to spread Christianity and education. Rev. Nathan Brown and Oliver Cutter were the first to arrive in 1837, and Bronson arrived at Sadiya in Assam on 8 July, 1838. Brown and Cutter, along with their families, had landed at Sadia with the objective to go to northern Burma and southern China through Sadiya. Initially, as part of their mission, they worked among the local people by establishing co-ed schools, writing books in the local languages, and preaching Christianity. They was prominent in the official recognition of the Assamese language.

After staying for almost a year, Bronson left Sadiya and moved to Joypur, Assam, in April 1838. At the time, Joypur, with its location on the bank of the Burhi Dihing River, was an important strategic point for the Company Government because of its road link to Burma. Joypur also had connections with adjoining towns, including Namsang. After the British occupation, the place became important for large-scale tea plantations.

At Joypur, Bronson opened a school with the help of Captain S. F. Hannay, the commandant of the Assam Light Infantry. Bronson spent his time studying languages of the surrounding tribes, including that of the Noctes and Wanchos. The Noctes at the time were concentrated in Namsang, Khonsa and the Liju area in the Tirap district of present-day Arunachal Pradesh. The Noctes had close contact with Joypur and frequently visited the area to trade salt. Most of these people spoke Assamese. Therefore, Bronson chose to work among the Noctes with a vision to go to Burma.

During this time the Bronsons had six daughters, including Sophie Bronson Titterington, who wrote several books including a short biography of her sister Maria; Maria went on to work at the school her mother had founded and was part of the Women’s Baptist Missionary Society of the West until her death from cholera at the age of 33.

=== Namsang ===
From his accounts, it is known that Bronson made his first journey to Namsang, on 7 January, 1839. Taking a rubber tent and an interpreter, he crossed dense forests, streams, and mountains. He was the first Caucasian to visit the area. At first, the villagers took him for a spy for the British East India Company, sent to collect information before annexing their territory. After waiting for two days by the side of the village, the Khonbao (chief) called upon him. Bronson told the villagers that he had come to learn their language and to preach the messages of the Gospel. With his geniality, soft words, and useful gifts, he was able to gain the goodwill of the Khonbao. Soon, the people accepted him into the village and the Khonbao allowed two of his sons to teach him the Nocte language. Bronson stayed in Namsang until January 29, 1839, studying and preparing a catechism in Nocte.

=== First Books in Nocte ===
Bronson and his fellow missionaries brought a printing press with them to Sadiya. They learned the Assamese, Khamti and Singpho languages, and prepared to write books in those languages. Very soon the missionaries began to publish books on their press at Sadiya. When they left Sadiya for Joypur in January 1839, following the Khamti insurrection, they took their printing press with them. After his first Namsang visit, Bronson prepared a catechism book in Nocte. The book was published in 1839 and Bronson followed it up with A Spelling Book and Vocabulary, written in English, Assamese, Singpho, and Naga. During his second visit to Namsang, he presented the two books to the Bor Khonbao (acting chief). Bronson wrote how the Bor Khonbao was pleased that two books had been printed in their language; it could no longer be said that they had no books. Bronson wrote another two books for the Noctes: Vocabulary in English, Assamese Singpho and Naga (1840), and Phases in English and Naga (1840). Ruth Bronson translated Worcester’s Primer into Nocte in 1840.

=== Second mission to Namsang ===
Bronson made his second Namsang mission on December 20, 1839. During this visit, he established a school with the help of villagers. On March 13, 1840, he brought his wife and daughter Marie from Joypur. Initially, running the school was difficult. Only the very young and relatives of the chief were eager to read at the school; the common people had no interest in learning to read and write, as they did not have sufficient time due to the manufacture of salt and completing other domestic chores. Evening school was established and held for those who worked and could not attend the school during the daytime. The scholars came to the school with their dao (swords) and spears. The villagers were not in favor of female education and were unwilling to spare their women from their traditional duties.

When Bronson was working among the Noctes, the American Board sent Cyrus Barker with his wife to assist him. Miles Bronson's sister, Rhoda Bronson, also came with Barker to work at Namsang. They arrived at Joypur on May 7, 1840. Rhoda Bronson went to Namsang with her brother on May 18, 1840, and busied herself with school affairs. Soon, she engaged herself in studying Nocte. The climate of Namsang was not favorable for Rhoda; frequent attacks of fever forced Bronson and his sister to return to Joypur on October 2, 1840. It was their last journey from Namsang.

The establishment of the school at Namsang was not totally unsuccessful. While the school was in operation Bronson wrote, all the sons of the chiefs came to the school and were able to read the books prepared for them. Several boys could read both in their own language and Romanized Assamese. Several had the desire to learn Assamese. Once, Bronson sent their native teacher Boliram to Namsang to see if they were daily reading or had forgotten what they learned. After returning, the native teacher reported a very favorable account of their reading in the evenings.

Besides his wife and the late sister Rhoda, Bronson was assisted by the Boliram and Bhugchandra in teaching. The later was an interpreter.

=== Mission suspended ===
The continued illnesses in his family brought an end to Bronson’s Namsang mission. After their arrival, they suffered again. There was no medicine and no doctor, either in Namsang or Joypur. Without proper treatment, Rhoda Bronson died on December 8, 1840. Afterward, Bronson was no longer eager to work in Namsang, moving to the plain areas of Assam. He went to Nowgong and opened the Nowgong Orphan Institution in 1843.

He worked with Nathan Brown and Cyrus Barker, organized and founded the first Baptist church at Panbazar in Guwahati on January 25, 1845.

Ruth Bronson died in 1869 and in 1871 Miles married Mrs. F. A. Danforth who died in Rangoon in 1874. Miles later married Mary Donnelly Rankin and they had twins, Laura and Ruth.

== Accounts on the Noctes ==
Bronson's writings throw light on the Noctes of the day. In his accounts he referred to dress, jewelry, customs, and language usage as well as the economy and political system of the tribe. Men (particularly the warriors) had their heads and ears ornamented with shells and precious stones. Describing their wild habits, he mentioned that they were indolent and had an untamed nature. He spoke of the hospitality of the Noctes and talked-about their economic life. The barter system existed among the Noctes. They lived entirely upon the profit of their salt springs and were daily seen on the plains, exchanging salt for needed goods. He also mentioned the process of salt making. The water was drawn from deep wells by buckets made of leaves, which was poured into large wooden troughs nearby for the purpose of boiling. The Noctes then built a long arch of stone and clay. On the top, thin but single joints of spread bamboo were placed closely together. These held up to three quarts each. The joints were kept full of brine and a large fire was kept blazing under them. When the water boiled away, it turned into salt. Making salt in this process took at least 6 men, wrote Bronson. It took one man to attend the arch, one to bring the brine, and four to gather wood. There was controversy over the land-rights to the wells and Bronson supported the idea of the government taking on the manufacture of salt, with Nagas working for the government.

Regarding their political system, Bronson wrote that councils were held among the chiefs on important matters. Regarding religion, he wrote that they had neither caste system, nor religion. He observed that after marrying Assamese brides, some people of the tribe inclined to the Brahmin faith. Ruth Bronson's writings described the traditional works of Nocte women.

== Motives ==
Bronson thought the key to creating material progress for the Noctes was to introduce the concept of tea plantation. For that purpose he kept close contact with the Company officials. Bronson’s letters to different British officials regarding the Namsang mission reveal his intense desire to uplift the Noctes from what he saw as utter backwardness, keeping in mind the goal of spreading Christianity.

In reality, the American Baptist missionaries had come to Assam at the invitation of the Company Government, with patronization from the British officials. The British administration and tea planters like C. Bruce had invited them, having political and economic ends, and aided the missionaries both with financial and moral support. Bronson had close relationships with British officials from his arrival in Assam. When he moved to Joypur for the first time, Bruce gave half of his residence over to Bronson for temporary settlement. In consultation with Captain Hannay, Bronson decided to work among the people of Namsang. He had donations from different British officials for the Namsang mission. From a letter of Bronson's, it is known that he received 600 rupees from Bruce and 240 rupees from Hannay in 1838, 50 rupees from Lieutenant Sturt and 200 rupees from T. C. Robertson in 1839, and 240 rupees from Hannay and 60 rupees from Lieutenant Brodie in 1840.

After the British occupation, Joypur became important for tea cultivation. Bronson saw the prospect of tea cultivation among the adjoining tribes of Joypur, particularly the Noctes. He seriously discussed the matter with Bruce. He hoped that it would help to civilize the peoples, improve the country, and bind the Nagas to the Company by another strong link. He was also in favor of introducing the cultivation of wheat, potatoes, garden vegetables, cotton, and apples.

At the request of Bronson, Jenkins wrote to T. H. Maddock, Secretary to the Government of India, about Bronson’s plan and requested a small amount for the cultivation.

I conceive that by a proper cooperation with that gentleman (Bronson) and the encouragement of the Nagas to cultivate the products of their hills and tea in particular, we may hope ere long to see civilization greatly advanced among these Nagas, and our supremacy gradually extend over the hills, without which, and the consequent suppression of the constant feuds amongst the tribes, there seem to be little hope of effecting any great change in the habits of the people, or of our being able to avail ourselves of the great natural resources of the fine tract of mountainous country.

In this letter, Jenkins requested the Secretary to give him permission to allow him to spend 100 rupees in aid of the mission. In his letter to Jenkins dated June 29, 1840, Bronson assured Jenkins that he would do as much possible as he could to successfully carry on "the proposed plan for the civilization of the wild Naga tribes." In the same letter, Bronson informed Jenkins that the Noctes suspected the expansion policy of the government (or the "Onward March"). In his letter, dated August 24, 1840, Bronson wrote to Jenkins that he had informed the Noctes about the tea plantation proposal of the Company, but they did not give consent about the implementation of the plan. Bronson realized that nothing important would ever be effected among the Naga tribes - either toward their education or civilization - until they were made less independent. Either the government could their salt springs or provide them with a better and cheaper kind of salt so they might be more readily induced to cultivate tea.

== Publications ==
Bronson wrote several books including;

- A spelling book and vocabulary in English, Assamese, Singpho and Naga (1839)
- Phases in English and Naga (1840)
- A dictionary in Assamese and English, (American Baptist mission press, 1867)
- Catechism in Assamese
