= Wancho =

Wancho may refer to:

- Wancho people
- Wancho language
- Wancho script
- Wancho (Unicode block), a Unicode block containing the characters used to write the Wancho language
- "Wancho", a Korean word for sedge, in wanchojang, the traditional Korean art of creating mats, baskets and boxes
