= Sumpam Tangjang =

Indian academic administrator

- Born: 5 November 1978 (age 47). Kaimai Village, Arunachal Pradesh, India
- Education: Rajiv Gandhi University
- Occupations: Professor; Administrator
- Organization(s): Rajiv Gandhi University; Jawaharlal Nehru College
- Known for: Educationist
- Website: rgu.ac.in/sumpam-tangjang/

Sumpam Tangjang is well known botanist of the region and the First Nocte person to receive a Doctor of Philosophy degree. He was also the first Dean of the Faculty of Agricultural Sciences at Rajiv Gandhi University.

== Work ==
Tangjang is best known for his studies on Aristolochia (Pipeworts) and Chlorophytum of Northeastern India (in the Himalayas and Indo-Burma biodiversity hotspots) apart from several other genera.
