= Pullong, Tirap =

Village in Arunachal Pradesh, India

- Village
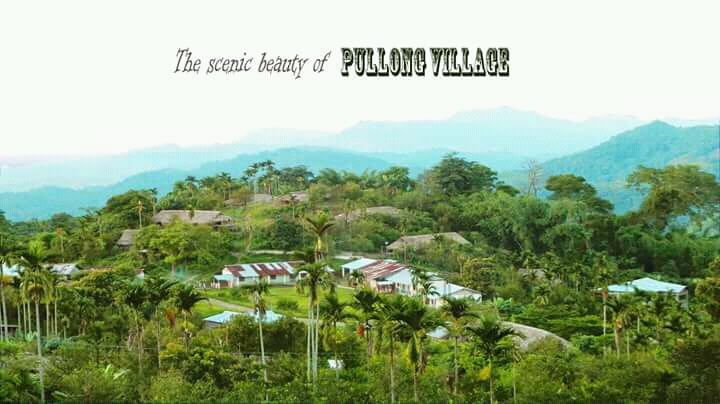
- An image of Pullong Village
- Interactive map of Pullong, Tirap
- Country: India
- State: Arunachal Pradesh
- District: Tirap district
- Time zone: UTC+5.30 (IST)
- PIN: 786630

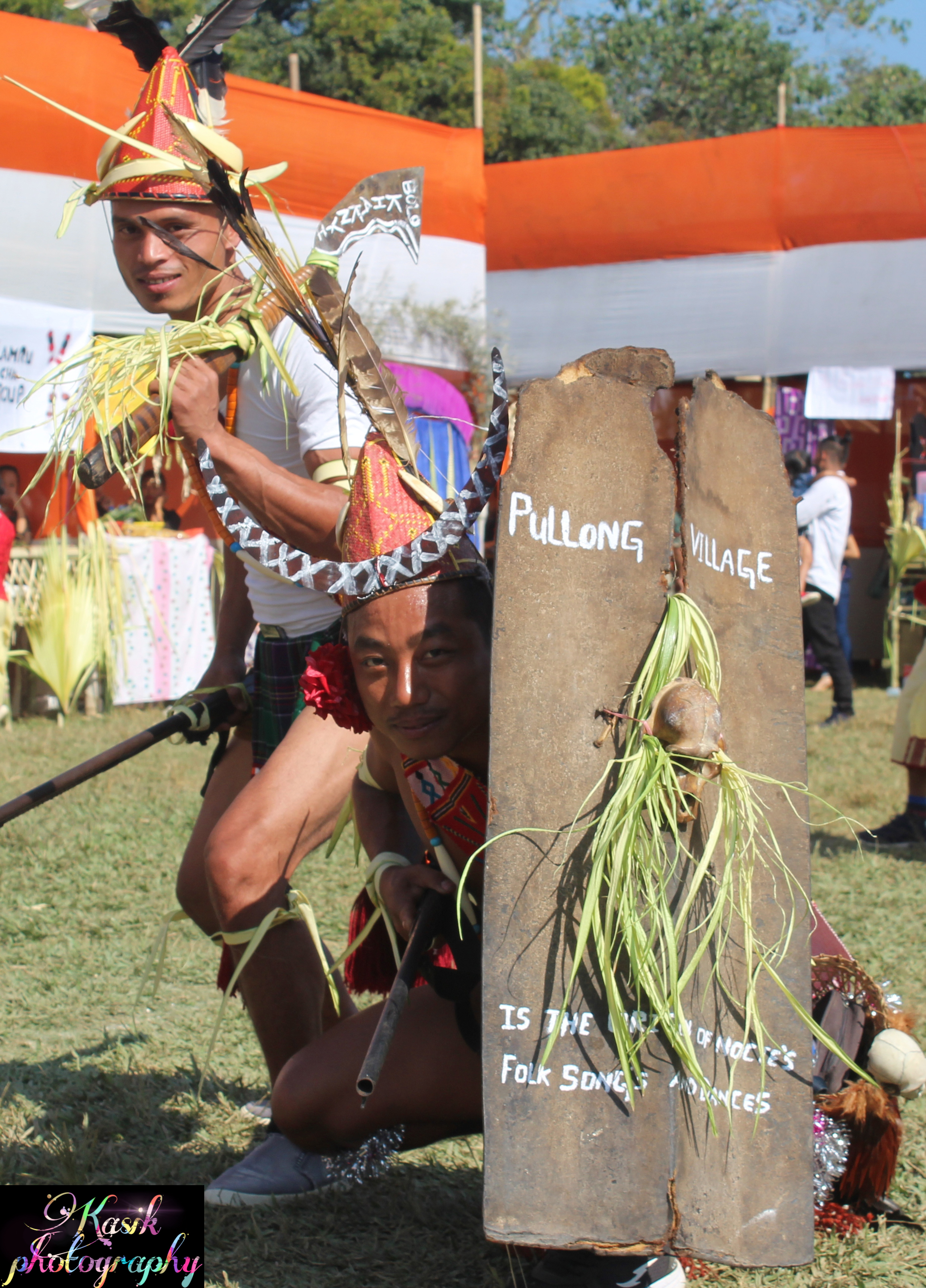
Two Kasik Warriors with shield

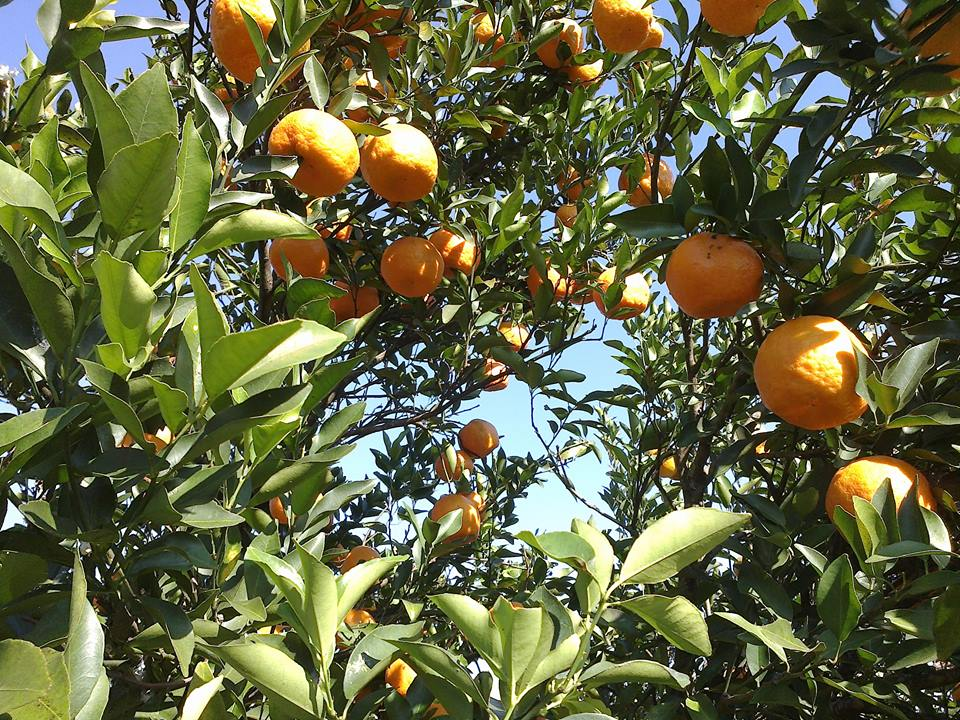
Orange fruits of Pullong Village, Arunachal Pradesh available in the month November–December

Pullong is a village in the Tirap district of the Indian state of Arunachal Pradesh.

== Etymology ==
Pullong is locally and originally named as 'Boachim'. 'Boa' means 'dance' and 'Chim' means 'salt'. It is named so because it is believed to be the first place where salt was found and the folk dance of the region originated.

== Geography ==
It is a small village in Tirap district of Arunachal Pradesh. It is located at 27.044°N 95.448°E. The ancient original inhabitants of the land are referred to as Kasik. Boachim is 15 km away from Khonsa, the district headquarter of Tirap and lies on NH-315.

== Demographics ==
According to the 2011 Census of India, the location code or village code of Pullong village is 264478. Khonsa is the nearest town to Pullong village.

Total Population :375

Male Population: 191

Female Population: 184

== Economy ==
It is the leading producer of oranges in the region, known for its extra sweetness and is the pride of the village.

== Culture ==
There exist the system of chieftainship in the village. The inhabitants of Boachim belongs to Nocte tribe. Nocte means "villagers". They commonly speak Kasik dialect which is the ancient and original dialect of the Noctes. The word Kasik means "ancient language". Except for these three villages - Boachim (pullong), Tupi and Noksa, the rest speaks other ethnic dialect. Although Kasik is the original dialect of the Noctes, today it is known only to a handful. But the "Kasik" dialect has been found to be in used in the villages of Hilani naga gaon and Boantoan which fall under the Sivasagar district and Dibrugarh district of Assam.

== Infrastructure ==
Pullong is connected by road with National Highway 512A passing to Khonsa. Pullong is not connected with the rail network. The nearest railway station is at Naharkatia in Assam. It can be reached by a State Transport Bus or a mini reserved vehicle taking a time of 4 hours, from Dibrugarh and Tinsukia in Assam.
