= Longphong =

Village in Arunachal Pradesh, India

- Village
- Map of Arunachal Pradesh Longphong (India)
- Coordinates: 26.77808°N 95.282257°E
- Country: India
- State: Arunachal Pradesh
- District: Tirap
- Tehsil: Longding

Population (2011)
  - Total: 1,174

Languages
  - Official: Wancho
- Time zone: UTC+5:30 (IST)
- Postal code: 786631
- Census code: 264533

Longphong is a census village in Longding circle of Tirap district in Arunachal Pradesh, India. Longphong is 78 km from Khonsa, the district headquarters. In the 2011 Census of India, it had a population of 1,174 people including 493 males and 681 females. Longphong is mainly populated by Wancho tribal people.

Longphong has a disturbance of poppy cultivation and militancy activities.
