= Wangcha Rajkumar =

Indian politician

Member of Parliament for Arunachal East

Personal details
- Born: 29 December 1966 Namsang, North-East Frontier Agency (now Arunachal Pradesh), India
- Died: 23 December 2007 (aged 40) Deomali, Arunachal Pradesh, India
- Manner of death: Assassination by gunshot
- Party: Indian National Congress
- Spouse: Secha Rajkumar (m. 1992)
- Children: 1
- Profession: Political and Social Worker

Wangcha Rajkumar (29 December 1966 - 23 December 2007) was an Indian politician and former Member of Parliament, Lok Sabha representing Arunachal Pradesh East from 1996 to 2004. He was assassinated by unidentified assailants on 23 December 2007.

== Personal life ==
Rajkumar was born on 29 December 1966 to Wangmai Rajkumar and Chamcha Rajkumar in Namsang tehsil of the Tirap district of Arunachal Pradesh. He was educated at Ramakrishna Mission in Deomali. Rajkumar married Secha Rajkumar on 22 April 1992, with whom he had a son.

== Political career ==
As a member of the Indian National Congress party, Rajkumar was the Joint Secretary of the Indian Youth Congress from 1987 to 1990 and the District Congress from 1990 to 1994. He became a Member of the Arunachal Pradesh Legislative Assembly in 1995.

Subsequently he was elected as the Member of Parliament in the 11th, 12th, and 13th Lok Sabha as a representative of the Arunachal Pradesh East constituency from 1996 to 2004. During his tenure, Rajkumar was a member of the Public Accounts Committee; Committee on Government Assurances; Committee on Food, Civil Supplies and Public Distribution; Consultative Committee, Ministry of Power; Rules Committee; and Consultative Committee, Ministry of Home Affairs.

== Death ==
Rajkumar was shot dead by two unidentified assailants on 23 December 2007 at Deomali Community Hall while playing badminton. In 2011, the Central Bureau Of Investigation revealed that members of separatist group National Socialist Council of Nagaland were involved in the assassination and had arrested a member in the process. However the case is still pending as of June 2019.
