= Senua (disambiguation) =

Senua is a name variation of the Celtic goddess Senuna.

Senua may also refer to:

- Senua (Hellblade), the protagonist of the Hellblade video game series
- Senua (video game), an upcoming video game in the Hellblade series
- Senua, Arunachal Pradesh, a village in India
