= Joypur, Assam =

Joypur
- Town
- Location in Assam, India Joypur (India)
- Coordinates: 27.2679°N 95.3893°E
- Country: India
- State: Assam
- District: Dibrugarh
- Elevation: 123 m (404 ft)

Population (2011)
  - Total: 2,491

Languages
  - Official: Assamese
- Time zone: UTC+5:30 (IST)
- PIN: 292341
- ISO 3166 code: IN-AS
- Vehicle registration: AS-06

Joypur (Assamese: জয়পুৰ) alternatively spelled Jaipur and Jeypore, is a town located in Naharkatiya, Dibrugarh district of the state of Assam in Northeast India. According to the last census, the population of Joypur is 2,491 people.

The town is located on the bank of the Burhi Dihing River. In the 19th century, Joypur was an important strategic point for the Company Government due to its location and road link to Myanmar. Due to its strategic location, a British garrison post was established at Joypur after the First Anglo-Burmese War, and the town became an administrative centre for British interactions with indigenous populations in the nearby Naga Hills. During this time, Joypur was also a common post for Christian missionaries operating in North East India, such as Nathan Brown, a missionary from New Hampshire, who set up his base in the town from 1839 until 1843, and Miles Bronson who was based in Joypur beginning in 1838.

According to the 2011 census, Joypur Town has a total population of 2'491 with 520 homes. The literacy rate in Joypur Town is 79.8%. Joypur is also home to the Jeypore Rainforest park, covering approximately 108 km^{2}. (10,876.68 hectares), and is well known for its abundant orchid varieties.
