= Tirong Aboh =

Indian politician (died 2019)

Member of the Arunachal Pradesh Legislative Assembly
- In office 17 May 2014 – 21 May 2019
- Preceded by: Yumsem Matey
- Succeeded by: Chakat Aboh
- Constituency: Khonsa West

Personal details
- Born: 20 January 1978 Arunachal Pradesh, India
- Died: 21 May 2019 (aged 41) Bogapani, Tirap
- Party: National People's Party
- Spouse: Chakat Aboh
- Children: 1

Tirong Aboh (20 January 1978 - 21 May 2019) was an Indian politician from the state of Arunachal Pradesh.

Aboh was elected from the Khonsa West constituency in the 2014 Arunachal Pradesh Legislative Assembly election, standing as a People's Party of Arunachal candidate.

== Death ==
He and his son were among 11 people shot dead by unknown militants, on 21 May 2019, in the Bogapani area of the Tirap district.

== See also ==
- Arunachal Pradesh Legislative Assembly
