= Mintong =

Village in Arunachal Pradesh, India

- Village
- Map of Arunachal Pradesh Mintong (India)
- Coordinates: 26.7987°N 95.30306°E
- Country: India
- State: Arunachal Pradesh
- District: Tirap
- District: Tirap

Population (2011)
  - Total: 1,505

Languages
  - Official: Wancho
- Time zone: UTC+5:30 (IST)
- Postal code: 786631
- STD Code: 03786

Mintong is a village and Gram Panchayat (GP) in Longding circle of Tirap district in Arunachal Pradesh, India. As per 2011 Census of India, Mintong has a total population of 1,505 peoples, including 730 males and 775 females.

Mintong has a plantation of tea, coffee, cardamom and bamboo for economic development.
