= Yumsem Matey =

Indian politician

Yumsem Matey was an Indian politician from Lazu village in the Tirap district of Arunachal Pradesh. A member of the Ollo community, he made history as the community's first graduate, earning his B.A. (Hons) in History from Government College, Itanagar, in 1993. Before entering politics, he served as the District Adult Education Officer (DAEO) in Changlang district.

In 2009, Matey was elected to the Arunachal Pradesh Legislative Assembly from the Khonsa West constituency on an Indian National Congress ticket. During his tenure, he served as a Parliamentary Secretary, overseeing the Department of Women and Social Welfare, Social Justice and Tribal Affairs, and the Department of Tirap, Changlang, and Longding (DOTCL). He later joined the Bharatiya Janata Party (BJP) in 2015.
