= Longding district =

- District of Arunachal Pradesh
- Location in Arunachal Pradesh
- Interactive map of Longding district
- Coordinates: 26.9°N 95.3°E
- Country: India
- State: Arunachal Pradesh

Area
  - Total: 1,192 km^{2} (460 sq mi)

Population (2011)
  - Total: 56,953
  - Density: 47.78/km^{2} (123.7/sq mi)
- Time zone: UTC+05:30 (IST)
- Website: longding.nic.in

Longding District (/lɒŋˈdɪŋ/) is one of the 20 administrative districts of Arunachal Pradesh in northeastern India. It was carved out of the southwestern portion of Tirap District in 2012. Longding shares its boundaries to the south and southeast with Myanmar, to the west with Nagaland, to the north with Assam, and to the northeast with Tirap District. Longding has a population of around 60,000 and an area of roughly 1,200 km^{2} (460 sq mi). Longding is home to the Wancho people. Because of the hilly terrain of the Patkai Range, the district experiences a humid subtropical climate, with temperatures ranging from 5 °C (41 °F) in the winter to 35 °C (95 °F) in the summer.

== History ==
The district has been historically inhabited by the Wancho people. With low productivity, the district was considered one of the most backward in the state. The creation of the new district was approved by the state cabinet on 7 August 2009, under the chairmanship of the then chief minister Dorjee Khandu. The state government constituted a high-power committee on 23 June 2010, for finalizing the district boundary. According to the report submitted by high power committee on 11 August 2011, the Longding District was created on 26 September 2011 bypassing The Arunachal Pradesh Bill 2011 by voice-vote. The district was formally inaugurated on 19 March 2012 by chief minister Nabam Tuki.

== Education ==
There is no higher education institution in the district. Wangcha Rajkumar Government College, Deomali in Tirap district caters to the students from Longding district.

== Divisions ==
The district consists of six subdivisions or circles: Longding, Kanubari, Pongchau, Wakka, Pumao, and Lawnu. It includes the villages of Longphong, Nianu, Niausa, Senua, Senua Noksa, Zedua, Nginu, Ngissa, Mintong, Chanu, Longchan, Chubam, Russa, and Rangluwa.

== Demographics ==
Languages of Longding (2011)
1. Wancho (94.9%)
2. Hindi (1.56%)
3. Bengali (0.84%)
4. Assamese (0.60%)
5. Nepali (0.57%)
6. Nocte (0.51%)
7. Others (1.06%)

The district has a population of 56,953 as of 2011. The district is inhabited mainly by the Wancho people. They are culturally similar to the Naga people. They practice gun making, wood carving, and bead making. They follow a type of slash-and-burn cultivation known as the jhum cultivation. The Wancho people traditionally practised Animism, but the majority converted to Christianity in the late 20th century.

=== Religion ===
Religion in Longding district (2011)
Religion	Percent
Christianity	91.97%
Hinduism	5.73%
Rangfrah	1.27%
Islam	0.60%
Buddhism	0.43%
