= Deomali =

- Town
- Deomali
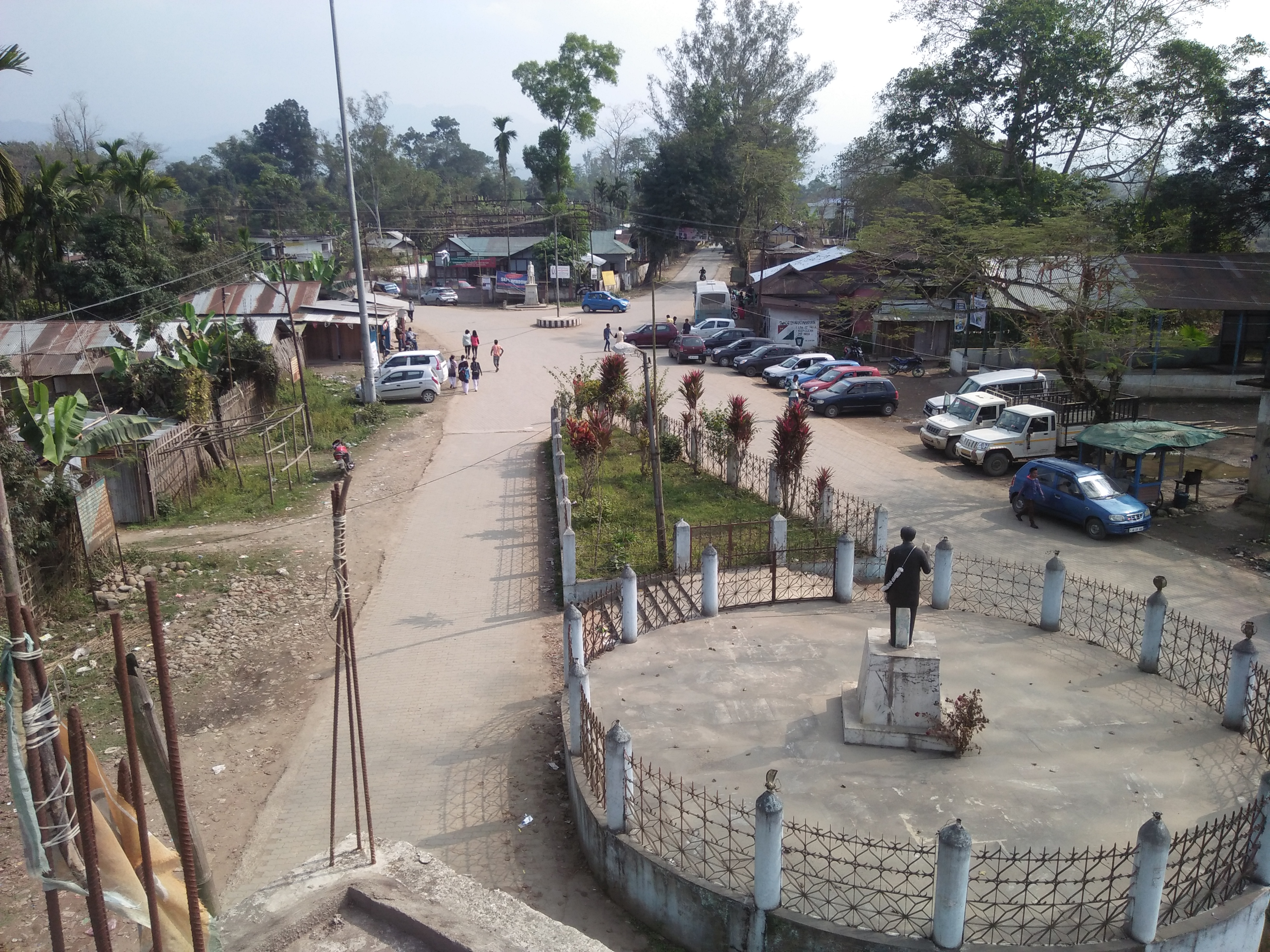
- Deomali
- Nicknames: Gateway to Tirap, Education Hub of Tirap, Town of Tea Gardens
- Location in Arunachal Pradesh, India Deomali (India)
- Coordinates: 27.15857°N 95.47816°E
- Country: India
- State: Arunachal Pradesh
- District: Tirap

Government
  - Type: Town Administration
  - Body: Office of the Additional Deputy Commissioner, Deomali
  - Additional Deputy Commissioner: Vishakha Yadav, IAS
  - Member of Legislative Assembly: Wangki Lowang
  - Member of Parliament: Tapir Gao

Area
  - Total: 15 km^{2} (5.8 sq mi)
- Elevation: 131 m (430 ft)

Population (2023)
  - Total: 9,200
- Demonym: Deomalian

Languages
  - Official: English
- Time zone: UTC+5:30 (IST)
- Postal code: 792129
- ISO 3166 code: IN-AR
- Vehicle registration: AR
- Literacy Rate: ▲81.86%
- Climate: Cwa high
- Lok Sabha Constituency: Arunachal East
- Assembly Constituency: Namsang Assembly Constituency
- Website: tirap.nic.in

Deomali is a census town in Tirap district in the state of Arunachal Pradesh, India. The town is surrounded by hills, tea gardens, forests and rivers. It serves as the headquarters of both Deomali sub division and Namsang block. It is considered as the education hub of Tirap district and is home to Wangcha Rajkumar Government College, Deomali and renowned educational institution Ramakrishna Mission School, Narottam Nagar. Deomali also has a centre of Krishi Vigyan Kendra. The Coffee Board of India has established a Technical Evaluation Centre in Deomali, one of its such six centres in India. Additionally, Coffee Board of India maintains a 26 acres coffee plantation in Deomali. The town is 250 km from state capital Itanagar, 43 km from district headquarter Khonsa, 30 km from Margherita, 33 km from Naharkatia, 46 km from Tinsukia, 73 km from Dibrugarh and 455 km from Guwahati.

Deomali has a humid, sub tropical and dry winter climate. Wangcha Rajkumar Government College, Deomali is the sole college in Tirap and Longding districts.

== Geography ==
Deomali is located at 27.15857'N 95.47816'E .

== Climate ==
Climate data for Deomali (1991–2020)
Month	Jan	Feb	Mar	Apr	May	Jun	Jul	Aug	Sep	Oct	Nov	Dec	Year
Record high °C (°F)	28.6 (83.5)	31.8 (89.2)	34.8 (94.6)	38.0 (100.4)	39.4 (102.9)	39.6 (103.3)	38.2 (100.8)	38.6 (101.5)	38.0 (100.4)	38.0 (100.4)	32.6 (90.7)	29.8 (85.6)	39.6 (103.3)
Mean daily maximum °C (°F)	24.0 (75.2)	26.1 (79.0)	28.7 (83.7)	29.7 (85.5)	32.0 (89.6)	32.3 (90.1)	32.8 (91.0)	32.8 (91.0)	32.5 (90.5)	31.1 (88.0)	28.3 (82.9)	24.9 (76.8)	31.3 (88.3)
Mean daily minimum °C (°F)	7.3 (45.1)	9.2 (48.6)	12.4 (54.3)	15.2 (59.4)	18.2 (64.8)	21.5 (70.7)	22.0 (71.6)	21.6 (70.9)	21.1 (70.0)	17.5 (63.5)	11.0 (51.8)	7.4 (45.3)	15.7 (60.3)
Record low °C (°F)	2.0 (35.6)	2.0 (35.6)	7.2 (45.0)	11.2 (52.2)	11.0 (51.8)	14.6 (58.3)	14.0 (57.2)	16.6 (61.9)	14.7 (58.5)	10.0 (50.0)	6.0 (42.8)	2.8 (37.0)	2.0 (35.6)
Average rainfall mm (inches)	5.8 (0.23)	15.4 (0.61)	92.4 (3.64)	197.7 (7.78)	284.2 (11.19)	482.1 (18.98)	469.1 (18.47)	443.0 (17.44)	214.3 (8.44)	128.8 (5.07)	3.5 (0.14)	8.2 (0.32)	2,344.5 (92.30)
Average rainy days	1.0	1.8	6.0	13.4	15.4	18.8	18.8	17.6	11.2	7.6	0.4	1.0	113.0
Source: India Meteorological Department

== Demographics ==
As of 2023, Deomali had a population of 9200. Males constitute 53% of the population and females 47%. Deomali has an average literacy rate of 81.86%, higher than the national average of 59.5%: male literacy is 86.77% and, female literacy is 76.71%.

== Governance and Politics ==
Deomali is under 54th Namsang Assembly Constituency and it is one of the 60 Legislative Assembly Constituency of Arunachal Pradesh. The current Member of legislative assembly is Wangki Lowang.

Deomali is part of Arunachal East Lok Sabha Constituency. The current Member of Parliament is Tapir Gao.

== Attractions ==
Attractions in and around Deomali includes -

- Chalo Loku :

Chalo Loku is a festival celebrated by the Nocte people. It takes place annually on November 25 at the General Ground in Deomali. Dance, music and fashion shows are held. It starts from 22 November.

- 2 Number River :

It is a common picnic spot in the town.

- St. George Catholic Church :

St. George Catholic Church, Deomali in the town serves as the parish church of the Roman Catholic Diocese of Miao.

- Narottam Nagar :

Narottam Nagar is nearly 7 km away from the town, it houses the renowned Ramakrishna Mission School.

- Buddha Statue :

A 12 feet statue of Buddha seated on a 12 feet pedestal in Narottam Nagar.

- Shiva Statue :

18 feet Shiva statue at the southern side of Buri Dihing river inside a tea garden in Narottam Nagar.

- Swamiji Statue :

18 feet high statue of Swami Vivekananda (30 feet from road level including pedestal) by the side of a new 2.6 km diversion road (Vivekananda Marg) in Narottam Nagar.

- Villages :

Nearby villages are the best attractions in Deomali.

- Shanti Mandir

Shanti Mandir is a Hindu temple dedicated to Shiva.

- Deomali Town Baptist Church :

A Baptist church in the town.

== Media and communication ==
Deomali has an All India Radio Relay station known as Akashvani Deomali. It broadcasts on FM frequencies.

The town is covered by several mobile networks, including the major cellular providers such as Airtel, Jio, and BSNL offering 4G and 5G services. Additionally, there are options for both wired and wireless broadband internet services.

== Economy ==
Deomali has a diverse economic landscape, primarily driven by the government sector and agriculture.

- Government Sector

The government sector plays a pivotal role in Deomali, providing employment opportunities and public services.

- Agriculture

Agriculture forms the backbone of the local economy, with an emphasis on cultivating various crops. The town is renowned for its production of tea, pineapples, betel nuts, palm leaves, and bamboo. Deomali has a centre of Krishi Vigyan Kendra.

- Tea Industry

The town is home to numerous tea gardens and dedicated tea growers. The tea industry here thrives, with several tea gardens producing high-quality teas.

- Coffee Industry

The Coffee Board of India has established a Technical Evaluation Centre in Deomali, one of its such six centres in India. Additionally, Coffee Board of India maintains a 26 acres coffee plantation in Deomali.

- Historical Context

In the 90s, Deomali had an industrial sector, particularly in timber production. However, this era came to an end following a Supreme Court order that banned the cutting down of trees.

== Festivals ==
Festivals like Christmas, Durga Puja, Diwali, Magh Bihu, Shivratri and Holi are celebrated in Deomali but the main festival is Chalo Loku, the festival of Nocte tribe and it is celebrated on 25 November every year.

== Education ==
Deomali is the education hub of Tirap district. There are many Government and Private educational institutions in Deomali Town, which are:

=== Schools ===
- Ramakrishna Mission School, Narottam Nagar.
- Government Higher Secondary School.
- Government Middle School, NTC Colony.
- Government Upper Primary School, NCI Colony.
- Government Primary School, Natun Basti Colony.
- St. George School.
- Sun Hum Primary School.
- Ang Kids School.
- Good Sepherd School.
- Maa Sarada School, Narottam Nagar.
- Dayanand Arya Vidyapeeth.
- Arunachal Vikas Parishad Balwadi School.

=== Colleges ===
- Wangcha Rajkumar Government College, Deomali.

== Transport ==
=== Road ===
Deomali is well connected by roads to the major towns of Arunachal Pradesh and Assam.

Buses and cars operating from Deomali to other places are:

- Deomali-Khonsa (Tata Sumo) 50 km
- Deomali-Longding (Tata Sumo) 90 km
- Deomali-Miao (APSTS Bus) 90 km
- Deomali-Itanagar (Network Travels Bus & Deep Travels Bus) 290 km
- Deomali-Tinsukia (APSTS Buses, Private Buses & Hired Cars) 60 km
- Deomali-Margherita (APSTS Buses, Private Bus & Hired Cars) 20 km
- Deomali-Dibrugarh (APSTS Buses & Hired Cars) 75 km
- Deomali-Guwahati (Private Buses) 490 km

Direct buses and cars are available from Itanagar, Dibrugarh and Tinsukia to Deomali, but people travelling from other places via Guwahati can also reach Deomali through connecting buses or wingers which ply on a daily basis from Tinsukia and Dibrugarh. The town of Deomali is connected to the closest state of Assam through Naharkatia in Dibrugarh district and also through Margherita in Tinsukia district. Both the towns Naharkatia and Margherita in Assam are at a distance of 20 km from Deomali. Private cars travel in this area all day but regular bus or any other service to Deomali from Tinsukia and Dibrugarh are not available after 12 noon, and hence travelling in morning hours is a wise option.

=== Railway ===
Margherita railway Station is the nearest railway station, which is nearly 30 km away from the town. Car and busem services are easily available from the railway station to Deomali.

New Tinsukia Railway Station is the nearest major railway station, which is nearly 48 km away from Deomali. Car and bus services are easily available from the railway station to Deomali.

Other Railway Stations near Deomali includes Naharkatia railway station (32 km away).

In 2017, The Ministry of Railway sanctioned eight new railway lines : Itakhola–Seijosa (18 km), Doomdooma –Namsai– Wakro (96 km), Dangri – Roing (60 km), Naharkatia – Deomali (20 km), Lekhapani-Nampong – New Khamlang – Deben (75 km), Tinsukia – Pasighat via Kanubari (300 km).

=== Air ===
Dibrugarh Airport is the nearest domestic airport, which is around 69 km away from Deomali. Car and bus services are easily available from the airport to Deomali.

== Sports ==
Football is the most popular sport in the town. Football tournaments are held at the General Ground.

Narottam Badminton Club is the badminton facility in the town.

== Notable people ==
- Wangcha Rajkumar : former 3 times Lok Sabha MP & MLA
- Wangpha Lowang : former minister & Lok Sabha MP
- Wangki Lowang : Minister of PHED & WS, DoTCL & Information Technology
- Mimi Chakraborty : MP, Bengali Actress
