= Niausa =

Village in Arunachal Pradesh, India

Niausa is a village located in Longding district ( earlier Tirap district of Arunachal Pradesh in India.

As per Population Census 2011 there are 272 families residing in the village with population of 1924 with 1013 males and 911 females.
