= Wancho script =

Unicameral alphabet

Wancho Script 𞋒𞋀𞋉𞋃𞋕 𞋈𞋀𞋜𞋐𞋜
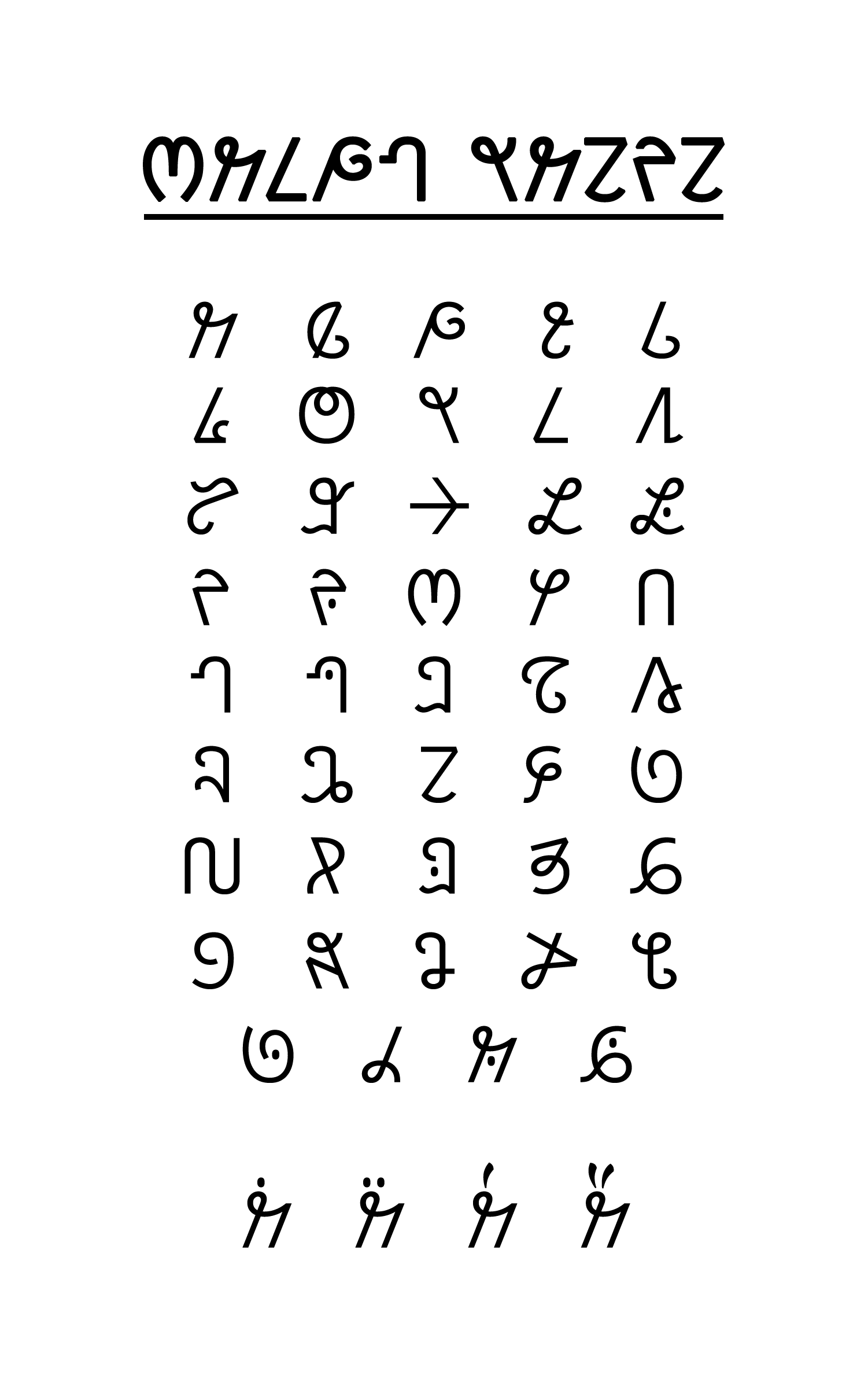
- Wancho Alphabet Chart
- Script type: Alphabet
- Creator: Banwang Losu
- Created: 2001
- Direction: Left-to-right
- Languages: Wancho language

ISO 15924
- ISO 15924: Wcho (283), Wancho

Unicode
- Unicode alias: Wancho
- Unicode range: U+1E2C0–U+1E2FF

Wancho script is an alphabet created between 2001 and 2012 by middle school teacher Banwang Losu in Longding district, Arunachal Pradesh for writing the Wancho language. Letters represent consonants and vowels. Conjunct consonants are not used. Tone is indicated with diacritical marks on vowel letters.

While Wancho script is taught in some schools, the Wancho language is generally written in either Devanagari script or the Latin alphabet.

== Unicode ==
Wancho script was added to the Unicode Standard in March 2019 on version 12.0.

The Unicode block for Wancho is U+1E2C0–U+1E2FF:

Wancho^{[1]}^{[2]} Official Unicode Consortium code chart (PDF)
	0	1	2	3	4	5	6	7	8	9	A	B	C	D	E	F
U+1E2Cx	𞋀	𞋁	𞋂	𞋃	𞋄	𞋅	𞋆	𞋇	𞋈	𞋉	𞋊	𞋋	𞋌	𞋍	𞋎	𞋏
U+1E2Dx	𞋐	𞋑	𞋒	𞋓	𞋔	𞋕	𞋖	𞋗	𞋘	𞋙	𞋚	𞋛	𞋜	𞋝	𞋞	𞋟
U+1E2Ex	𞋠	𞋡	𞋢	𞋣	𞋤	𞋥	𞋦	𞋧	𞋨	𞋩	𞋪	𞋫	𞋬	𞋭	𞋮	𞋯
U+1E2Fx	𞋰	𞋱	𞋲	𞋳	𞋴	𞋵	𞋶	𞋷	𞋸	𞋹						𞋿
Notes 1.As of Unicode version 17.0 2.Grey areas indicate non-assigned code points
