= Chakat Aboh =

Indian politician

Member of the Arunachal Pradesh Legislative Assembly
- Incumbent
- Assumed office 24 October 2019
- Preceded by: Tirong Aboh
- Constituency: Khonsa West

Personal details
- Party: Bharatiya Janata Party
- Other political affiliations: Trinamool Congress
- Spouse: Tirong Aboh (deceased)
- Profession: Politician

Chakat Aboh is an Indian politician from Arunachal Pradesh. She was elected as a member of the Arunachal Pradesh Legislative Assembly from Khonsa West on 24 October 2019. She won with 5,705 votes against her opponent, Azet Homtok, who received 3,818 votes. Although she was elected as an independent candidate, she is associated with the Bharatiya Janata Party. She was the wife of the late National People's Party leader Tirong Aboh.
