= Wancho (Unicode block) =

- Range: U+1E2C0..U+1E2FF (64 code points)
- Plane: SMP
- Scripts: Wancho
- Assigned: 59 code points
- Unused: 5 reserved code points

Unicode version history
- 12.0 (2019): 59 (+59)

Unicode documentation
- Code chart ∣ Web page

Wancho is a Unicode block containing the characters of the script used to write the Wancho language.

Wancho^{[1]}^{[2]} Official Unicode Consortium code chart (PDF)
	0	1	2	3	4	5	6	7	8	9	A	B	C	D	E	F
U+1E2Cx	𞋀	𞋁	𞋂	𞋃	𞋄	𞋅	𞋆	𞋇	𞋈	𞋉	𞋊	𞋋	𞋌	𞋍	𞋎	𞋏
U+1E2Dx	𞋐	𞋑	𞋒	𞋓	𞋔	𞋕	𞋖	𞋗	𞋘	𞋙	𞋚	𞋛	𞋜	𞋝	𞋞	𞋟
U+1E2Ex	𞋠	𞋡	𞋢	𞋣	𞋤	𞋥	𞋦	𞋧	𞋨	𞋩	𞋪	𞋫	𞋬	𞋭	𞋮	𞋯
U+1E2Fx	𞋰	𞋱	𞋲	𞋳	𞋴	𞋵	𞋶	𞋷	𞋸	𞋹						𞋿
Notes: 1. As of Unicode version 16.0; 2. Grey areas indicate non-assigned code points

== History ==
The following Unicode-related documents record the purpose and process of defining specific characters in the Wancho block:

Version	Final code points (Note: Proposed code points and characters names may differ from final code points and names)	Count	L2 ID	WG2 ID	Document
12.0	U+1E2C0..1E2F9, 1E2FF	59	L2/17-042	N4785	Everson, Michael (2017-01-23), Preliminary proposal to encode the Wancho script
12.0	U+1E2C0..1E2F9, 1E2FF	59	L2/17-153		Anderson, Deborah (2017-05-17), "9. Wancho", Recommendations to UTC #151 May 2017 on Script Proposals
12.0	U+1E2C0..1E2F9, 1E2FF	59	L2/17-255		Anderson, Deborah; Whistler, Ken; Pournader, Roozbeh; Moore, Lisa; Liang, Hai (2017-07-28), "13. Wancho", Recommendations to UTC #152 July-August 2017 on Script Proposals
12.0	U+1E2C0..1E2F9, 1E2FF	59	L2/17-222		Moore, Lisa (2017-08-11), "C.3", UTC #152 Minutes
12.0	U+1E2C0..1E2F9, 1E2FF	59		N4953 (pdf, doc)	"9.2.2", Unconfirmed minutes of WG 2 meeting 66, 2018-03-23
12.0	U+1E2C0..1E2F9, 1E2FF	59	L2/17-067R2	N4787R2	Everson, Michael (2017-10-22), Proposal to encode the Wancho script
12.0	U+1E2C0..1E2F9, 1E2FF	59	L2/17-362		Moore, Lisa (2018-02-02), "C.18.2 Corrections to two Wancho character names", UTC #153 Minutes
12.0	U+1E2C0..1E2F9, 1E2FF	59		N4976R5	Evidence for Four Wancho Diacritics, 2018-06-16
12.0	U+1E2C0..1E2F9, 1E2FF	59	L2/18-264		Anderson, Deborah (2018-08-06), Error in three Wancho character names
12.0	U+1E2C0..1E2F9, 1E2FF	59	L2/18-300		Anderson, Deborah; et al. (2018-09-14), "10. Wancho", Recommendations to UTC #157 on Script Proposals
12.0	U+1E2C0..1E2F9, 1E2FF	59	L2/18-272		Moore, Lisa (2018-10-29), "D.4", UTC #157 Minutes
12.0	U+1E2C0..1E2F9, 1E2FF	59	L2/18-183		Moore, Lisa (2018-11-20), "Consensus 156-C11", UTC #156 Minutes
12.0	U+1E2C0..1E2F9, 1E2FF	59		N5020 (pdf, doc)	Umamaheswaran, V. S. (2019-01-11), "7.4.1 T4", Unconfirmed minutes of WG 2 meeting 67
12.0	U+1E2C0..1E2F9, 1E2FF	59	L2/20-121		Scheuren, Zachary; Losu, Banwang (2020-02-22), Proposal to change the code chart font for Wancho
12.0	U+1E2C0..1E2F9, 1E2FF	59	L2/20-105		Anderson, Deborah; Whistler, Ken; Pournader, Roozbeh; Moore, Lisa; Constable, Peter; Liang, Hai (2020-04-20), "10. Wancho", Recommendations to UTC #163 April 2020 on Script Proposals
12.0	U+1E2C0..1E2F9, 1E2FF	59	L2/20-102		Moore, Lisa (2020-05-06), "Action Item 163-A55", UTC #163 Minutes, "Prepare an erratum for the Wancho font"
