= Pumao =

Town in Arunachal Pradesh, India

- Town
- Location in Arunachal Pradesh, India Pumao (India)
- Coordinates: 26.8222°N 95.2078°E
- Country: India
- State: Arunachal Pradesh
- District: Tirap
- Elevation: 511 m (1,677 ft)

Population (2011)
  - Total: 4,934
- Time zone: UTC+5:30 (IST)
- PIN: 792131
- Vehicle registration: AR-13

Pumao is an urban locality in Tirap district, Arunachal Pradesh, India. As per the 2011 Census of India, Pumao has a total population of 4,934 people including 2,454 males and 2,480 females.

Pumao is militancy affected area with both militants and security forces' frequent actions.
