= Senua, Arunachal Pradesh =

Village in Arunachal Pradesh, India

Coordinates: 26°54′N 95°20′E

Senua is a village located in Longding district ( earlier Tirap district of Arunachal Pradesh in India.

As per Population Census 2011 there are 246 families residing in the village with population of 1477.
