= Nianu =

Village in Arunachal Pradesh, India

Coordinates: 26.837°N 95.305°E

Nianu is a village located in Longding district of Arunachal Pradesh in India.

As per Population Census 2011 there are 227 families residing in the village with population of 1340 with 682 males and 658 females.
