= Khonsa =

- Town
- Location in Arunachal Pradesh, India Khonsa (India)
- Coordinates: 26°59′26.914″N 95°30′6.605″E
- Country: India
- State: Arunachal Pradesh
- District: Tirap
- Elevation: 1,215 m (3,986 ft)

Population (2001)
  - Total: 9,229
- Time zone: UTC+5:30 (IST)
- Postal code: 792130
- ISO 3166 code: IN-AR
- Vehicle registration: AR

Khonsa is the headquarters of the Tirap district in the Indian state of Arunachal Pradesh. It also houses Ramakrishna Sarada Mission School and Christ the King ICSE School. The Nocte people, are the indigenous inhabitants. The town is cosmopolitan in nature, with citizens from multiple Indian states being found here. It is 43km away from Deomali, a census town.

== Geography ==
Khonsa is located at 27.02°N 95.57°E. It has an average elevation of 1215 metres (3986 feet).

== Education ==
Wangcha Rajkumar Government College in Deomali town is the only college in Tirap district which iss 43km away. Khonsa houses Ramakrishna Sarada Mission School and Christ the King ICSE School.

== Demographics ==
As per the Indian census of 2001, Khonsa had a population of 9229. Males constitute 56% of the population and females 44%. Khonsa has an average literacy rate of 74%, higher than the national average of 59.5%: male literacy is 80%, and female literacy is 65%. In Khonsa, 15% of the population is under 6 years of age.

As per the most recent Indian census [2011], Khonsa has a population of 9928. Male inhabitants number 5768 while female inhabitants number 4160. 11.27% of the population is younger than 6 years. Khonsa's literacy rate of 85% is much higher than the state average. 45.87% of the population belong to Scheduled Tribes (ST).

The majority of the people are Christians, mostly Baptist, although some are Roman Catholics. There are relatively few animists. Among Nocte Catholics, syncretism between traditional religions and Christianity is evident. Foreign proselytizers such as American-sponsored missionaries are active in Khonsa and neighboring districts. Christ King Catholic Church Khonsa has been actively spreading their version of spirituality among residents.

=== Languages ===
Languages spoken in Khonsa Town (2011)
1. Nocte (27.2%)
2. Hindi (13.4%)
3. Bengali (10.2%)
4. Nepali (8.29%)
5. Wancho (8.21%)
6. Bhojpuri (5.59%)
7. Assamese (4.76%)
8. Others (22.4%)

According to the 2011 Census, Nocte is Spoken by 2,704 people, Hindi by 1,327 people, Bengali by 1,008, Nepali by 823 people, Wancho by 799, Bhojpuri by 555 people and Assamese by 473.

== See also ==
- Wikipedia:WikiProject Indian cities
