= Arunachal Pradesh Police =

Indian state police force

- Arunachal Pradesh Police Department
- Motto: Truth, Service, Security

Jurisdictional structure
- Operations jurisdiction: Arunachal Pradesh, India
- Jurisdiction of Arunachal Pradesh Police
- Governing body: Government of Arunachal Pradesh
- General nature: Local civilian police

Operational structure
- Headquarters: Arunachal Pradesh, India

Website
- arunpol.nic.in

The Arunachal Pradesh Police is the law enforcement agency for the state of Arunachal Pradesh in the Republic of India after all it is a law enforcement agency but it also is involved in antiinsurgency operations in the state of Arunachal Pradesh and in the areas of Assam that border Arunachal Pradesh.

It has special agency's to deal with militancy in the state and these agency's are involved in activities other than law enforcement in the state. The Arunachal Pradesh Police Headquarters is located in Itanagar.

== Organisational structure ==
Arunachal Pradesh Police comes under direct control of Department of Home Affairs, Government of Arunachal Pradesh. The Arunachal Pradesh Police is headed by Director General of Police (DGP).

== Special agencies ==
- Intelligence Unit
- Security Battalion
- Commando Force
- Civil police
