= Khonsa West Assembly constituency =

Constituency of the Arunachal Pradesh legislative assembly in India

Coordinates: 26.991°N 95.492°E

Khonsa West
- Constituency No. 56 for the Arunachal Pradesh Legislative Assembly

Constituency details
- Country: India
- Region: Northeast India
- State: Arunachal Pradesh
- District: Tirap
- Lok Sabha constituency: Arunachal East
- Established: 1990
- Total electors: 11,737
- Reservation: ST

Member of Legislative Assembly
- 11th Arunachal Pradesh Legislative Assembly
- Incumbent Chakat Aboh
- Party: Bharatiya Janata Party
- Elected year: 2024

Khonsa West is one of the 60 assembly constituencies of Arunachal Pradesh, a northeastern state of India. It is part of Arunachal East Lok Sabha constituency.

== Members of the Legislative Assembly ==
| Year | Member | Party |
|---|---|---|
| 1990 | Sijen Kongkang | Indian National Congress |
| 1995 | Sijen Kongkang | Indian National Congress |
| 1999 | Thajam Aboh | Indian National Congress |
| 2004 | Thajam Aboh | Indian National Congress |
| 2009 | Yumsem Matey | Indian National Congress |
| 2014 | Tirong Aboh | People's Party of Arunachal |
| 2019 | Tirong Aboh | National People's Party |
| 2019 (Note: by-election) | Chakat Aboh | Trinamool Congress |
| 2024 | Chakat Aboh | Bharatiya Janata Party |

== Election results ==
=== Assembly Election 2024 ===
2024 Arunachal Pradesh Legislative Assembly election : Khonsa West
| Party | Candidate | Votes | % | ±% |
|---|---|---|---|---|
| BJP | Chakat Aboh | 4,093 | 40.08% | New |
| NCP | Yang Sen Matey | 3,289 | 32.20% | New |
| Independent | Azet Homtok | 1,972 | 19.31% | New |
| PPA | Gawang Hakhun | 466 | 4.56% | New |
| INC | Tangse Tekwa | 316 | 3.09% | New |
| NOTA | None of the Above | 77 | 0.75% | ▲0.04 |
| Margin of victory | | 804 | 7.87% | ▼11.94 |
| Turnout | | 10,213 | 87.02% | ▼5.36 |
| Registered electors | | 11,737 | | ▲13.85 |
| BJP gain from Independent | | Swing | ▼19.83 | |

=== Assembly By-election 2019 ===
2019 Arunachal Pradesh Legislative Assembly by-election : Khonsa West
| Party | Candidate | Votes | % | ±% |
|---|---|---|---|---|
| Independent | Chakat Aboh | 5,705 | 59.91% | New |
| Independent | Azet Homtok | 3,818 | 40.09% | New |
| NOTA | None of the Above | 68 | 0.71% | ▲0.55 |
| Margin of victory | | 1,887 | 19.82% | ▲8.93 |
| Turnout | | 9,523 | 91.83% | ▼1.80 |
| Registered electors | | 10,309 | | ▲0.16 |
| Independent gain from NPP | | Swing | ▲4.55 | |

=== Assembly Election 2019 ===
2019 Arunachal Pradesh Legislative Assembly election : Khonsa West
| Party | Candidate | Votes | % | ±% |
|---|---|---|---|---|
| NPP | Tirong Aboh | 5,366 | 55.36% | New |
| BJP | Phawang Lowang | 4,311 | 44.48% | ▲28.73 |
| NOTA | None of the Above | 16 | 0.17% | New |
| Margin of victory | | 1,055 | 10.88% | ▼11.19 |
| Turnout | | 9,693 | 94.17% | ▲2.17 |
| Registered electors | | 10,293 | | ▲9.55 |
| NPP gain from PPA | | Swing | | |

=== Assembly Election 2014 ===
2014 Arunachal Pradesh Legislative Assembly election : Khonsa West
| Party | Candidate | Votes | % | ±% |
|---|---|---|---|---|
| PPA | Tirong Aboh | 3,898 | 45.09% | New |
| INC | Yumsem Matey | 1,990 | 23.02% | ▼28.32 |
| BJP | Thajam Aboh | 1,361 | 15.75% | ▲14.28 |
| NPF | Phawang Lowang | 1,325 | 15.33% | New |
| NOTA | None of the Above | 70 | 0.81% | New |
| Margin of victory | | 1,908 | 22.07% | ▲16.11 |
| Turnout | | 8,644 | 92.00% | ▲1.88 |
| Registered electors | | 9,396 | | ▲7.86 |
| PPA gain from INC | | Swing | ▼6.24 | |

=== Assembly Election 2009 ===
2009 Arunachal Pradesh Legislative Assembly election : Khonsa West
| Party | Candidate | Votes | % | ±% |
|---|---|---|---|---|
| INC | Yumsem Matey | 4,030 | 51.34% | ▲5.47 |
| AITC | Thajam Aboh | 3,562 | 45.38% | New |
| NCP | Jitbo Aboh | 143 | 1.82% | New |
| BJP | Langwang Sumpa | 115 | 1.46% | New |
| Margin of victory | | 468 | 5.96% | ▲4.47 |
| Turnout | | 7,850 | 90.12% | ▼1.12 |
| Registered electors | | 8,711 | | ▲12.56 |
| INC hold | | Swing | ▲5.47 | |

=== Assembly Election 2004 ===
2004 Arunachal Pradesh Legislative Assembly election : Khonsa West
| Party | Candidate | Votes | % | ±% |
|---|---|---|---|---|
| INC | Thajam Aboh | 3,239 | 45.87% | ▲0.67 |
| Independent | Yumsem Matey | 3,134 | 44.38% | New |
| Independent | Hangliam Sumnyan | 688 | 9.74% | New |
| Margin of victory | | 105 | 1.49% | ▼7.47 |
| Turnout | | 7,061 | 89.66% | ▲5.16 |
| Registered electors | | 7,739 | | ▲9.34 |
| INC hold | | Swing | | |

=== Assembly Election 1999 ===
1999 Arunachal Pradesh Legislative Assembly election : Khonsa West
| Party | Candidate | Votes | % | ±% |
|---|---|---|---|---|
| INC | Thajam Aboh | 2,754 | 45.20% | ▼13.80 |
| NCP | Hangliam Sumnyan | 2,208 | 36.24% | New |
| BJP | Sijen Kongkang | 1,131 | 18.56% | New |
| Margin of victory | | 546 | 8.96% | ▼9.05 |
| Turnout | | 6,093 | 88.63% | ▼0.93 |
| Registered electors | | 7,078 | | ▲3.65 |
| INC hold | | Swing | | |

=== Assembly Election 1995 ===
1995 Arunachal Pradesh Legislative Assembly election : Khonsa West
| Party | Candidate | Votes | % | ±% |
|---|---|---|---|---|
| INC | Sijen Kongkang | 3,506 | 59.00% | ▲17.91 |
| Independent | Wangdi Hakhun | 2,436 | 41.00% | New |
| Margin of victory | | 1,070 | 18.01% | ▲7.25 |
| Turnout | | 5,942 | 89.68% | ▲2.86 |
| Registered electors | | 6,829 | | ▲0.03 |
| INC hold | | Swing | | |

=== Assembly Election 1990 ===
1990 Arunachal Pradesh Legislative Assembly election : Khonsa West
| Party | Candidate | Votes | % | ±% |
|---|---|---|---|---|
| INC | Sijen Kongkang | 2,361 | 41.10% | New |
| Independent | Hangliam Sumnyan | 1,743 | 30.34% | New |
| JD | Somlang Tangdong | 1,641 | 28.56% | New |
| Margin of victory | | 618 | 10.76% | |
| Turnout | | 5,745 | 85.28% | |
| Registered electors | | 6,827 | | |
| INC win (new seat) | | | | |
