= Nathan Brown (missionary) =

American missionary, Bible translator, and abolitionist

Rev. Nathan Brown
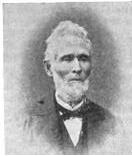
- Rev Nathan Brown
- Born: June 22, 1807; New Ipswich, New Hampshire, US
- Died: January 1, 1886 (aged 78); Yokohama, Japan
- Education: Williams College
- Occupations: American Baptist missionary to India and Japan
- Known for: Contribution to Assamese language and literature

Nathan Brown (Assamese: নাথান ব্ৰাউন; 22 June 1807 – 1 January 1886) was an American Baptist missionary to India and Japan, Bible translator, and abolitionist. He is noted for his works on Assamese language, grammar and script.

In around 1843, based in Sibsagar, he began translating the New Testament into Assamese under the title Amar Trankôrta Yisu Khristôr Nôtun Niyôm (আমাৰ ত্ৰাণকৰ্তা য়িচু খ্রিষ্টৰ নতুন নিয়ম) which he published in 1848. In 1854, he published another book titled খ্রিষ্টৰ বিবৰণ আৰু শুভ বাৰ্তা meaning roughly Jesus Christ and his Holy Messages. He also translated prayers alongside his other missionary colleagues. His work Grammatical Notices of the Assamese Language was published by the American Baptist Mission Press in 1848. In 1846, with his colleague Oliver Cutter, he published Orunodoi (অৰুনোদই), the first Assamese periodical. He also published works of contemporary and historical Assamese scholars, to name a few Ôxôm Burônzi (History of Assam, অসম বুৰঞ্জী) by Kashinath Phukan in 1844, Kitabôt Mônzôri (Mathematics, in Assamese verse, কিতাবত মঞ্জৰী) in two parts, Lilawôti and Pôdgônit by Bakul Kayastha in 1845, and Sutiya Burônzi (চুতিয়া বুৰঞ্জী) in 1850, as well as others. In Assam, Brown is considered to be a pioneer and champion of the native language and literature.

== Early life and missions to Burma and Assam ==
Eliza Brown, Wife

Born in New Ipswich, New Hampshire, he attended Williams College, where he graduated first in his class. He taught for two years in Vermont before he and his wife Eliza, whom he married in 1830, went on to serve as missionaries in Burma. In 1835, David Scott, the Agent to the Governor General in the North-East Frontier invited American Baptist Missionaries working in Burma (now Myanmar) to come to Assam to spread Christianity and education; Brown and Oliver Cutter were the first to arrive in 1837.

Brown's original intention had been to translate the Bible into Burmese, but he soon found himself pulled into a mission along with Cutter and Miles Bronson in the Indian region of Assam. By 1846 he had founded 14 Assamese-medium schools in Sibsagar and had written school textbooks in arithmetic and geography, as well as translating Pilgrim's Progress into Assamese; Eliza Brown also wrote story books and tracts, as well as setting up a girls' boarding school. Eliza Brown also ran a missionary school with Mrs Cutter.

In 1848, Brown published an Assamese grammar, followed by an Assamese translation of the New Testament. He found that the Assamese Bible published by William Carey from the Serampore Mission Press (1832), in circulation at the time, consisted of Bengali and Sanskrit loan words, so it was idiomatically inadequate. Therefore, he undertook (together with Carey's old colleague Pandit Atmaram Sharma) the project of translating the New Testament into pure and simple Assamese. From 1836 to 1873, Company and British Raj policy subsumed Assamese under the heading of Bengali. The language regained recognition in part due to Assamese publications edited by Brown, including an Assamese-English dictionary and an Assamese grammar book, as well as his association with Hemchandra Barua, who was taught at Brown's school. He was prominent in the official recognition of the Assamese language.

== Abolitionism ==
Following his return from Assam to New England in 1848, Nathan Brown joined the abolitionist movement, delivering anti-slavery sermons in Boston. This struggle eventually resulted in the American Civil War. Many proponents of the anti-slavery movement had to deal with the bloody results of their efforts in a personal struggle of conscience. Rev. Brown dealt with the question of violent means in Magnus Maharba.

Brown joined the American Baptist Free Mission Society and met with president Abraham Lincoln to discuss emancipation. The "haystack missionaries", including Nathan Brown, associated the account of the introduction of the Greek alphabet with the New Testament creation, and the idea of creating local alphabets for every language was an important first step towards the goal of a Bible translation for every language. The printing presses and schools of these missions also became a vehicle for empowerment of local language and culture.

In 1850 Brown returned to America to join his brother William in the growing abolitionist movement. In his satirical work Magnus Maharba and the Dragon, an account of the battle against slavery, Rev. Brown used the pen name Kristofer Kadmus. His decision to use this name illustrates his identification with the Greek mythological character. Cadmus was best known as a traveler and vector of culture and ideas. His journey in search of his lost sister Europa led to importation of the idea of alphabet into Greece. In myth, Cadmus killed a dragon that prevented mortals from reaching a sacred spring. He planted the dragon's teeth on the spot; they sprouted into armies that fought nearly to death, with the survivors building the city of learning.

== Missionary to the Japanese ==
After the war, in 1868, Brown turned his attention to the newly accessible Japan, at first by interacting with the students that Japan was sending to the Bridgeport Academy and Princeton University for education in Western world culture and technology. This cultural exchange was a two-way process. Rev. Brown published another satire showing America as seen through the eyes of one of these Japanese students, which was sharply critical of New England's materialism in place of spirituality. One exchange student, for whom Nathan Brown wrote a letter of reference to the Bridgeport Academy, eventually became an admiral in the Imperial Japanese Navy.

Eliza Whitney Brown died in 1871, and in 1872, Nathan married Charlotte Marlit. The same year, he returned to overseas missionary work, this time traveling to Japan to join Jonathan Goble, the first Baptist missionary to that country.

Brown and Goble collaborated to construct the first Japanese Baptist church (First Baptist Church of Yokohama) in 1873. Brown also worked with Japanese scholar Kawakatsu Tetsuya to produce a Japanese-language Bible based on what were then the oldest known Greek manuscripts; he would go on to print thousands of Hiragana copies for distribution print versions (with the goal of access to the Bible by less educated persons who might not understand Kanji). Brown died in Yokohama in 1886.

== Family ==
Brown had five children, of which two (Eliza and Nathan Worth) survived into adulthood.

His widow Charlotte went on to marry another missionary, William Ashmore, and they served with the American Baptist Missionary Union in Guangdong.

== Publications ==
Brown published a number of books including;

- The missionary's call. ([publisher not identified], 1820) (page images at HathiTrust)
- Grammatical notices of the Asamese language (Printed at the American Baptist Mission Press, 1848) (page images at HathiTrust)
- The New Testament of our Lord and savior Jesus Christ: translated into the Asamese [sic] language (American Baptist Mission Press, 1849) (page images at HathiTrust)
- Magnus Maha'rba. (Printed for the Filolojikal gemána, 1866) (page images at HathiTrust)
- The New Testament in vernacular Japanese: from the oldest existing Greek manuscripts, with interlinear notices of various readings ([American Baptist Missionary Union], 1879), also by Kawakatsu Tetsuya and American Baptist Missionary Union (page images at HathiTrust)
- The histori ov Magnus Maha'rba and the Blak Dragun (Printed for the Filolojikal gemána, 1908) (page images at HathiTrust)

== See also ==
- Assamese Language Movement
