= Jawaharlal Nehru College =

College in Arunachal Pradesh

- Established: 1964; 62 years ago
- Academic affiliations: Rajiv Gandhi University
- Principal: Milorai Modi
- Location: Pasighat, East Siang district, Arunachal Pradesh
- Website: www.jncpasighat.edu.in

Jawaharlal Nehru College is located in Pasighat Township in the East Siang district, in the North-Eastern part of Indian state of Arunachal Pradesh.

== Basic Information ==
About the Institution.

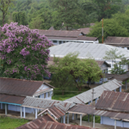
View of JNC

| Type | Detail |
|---|---|
| Year of Establishment | 1964 |
| Courses offered | BA/B.Sc/B. Com I/II/III Years (Hons. & Pass Courses) and Master's Degree in History, Hindi, Geography and English |
| No. of Students admitted during the session 2008-09 | 2369 |
| Pass Percentage (2007–08) | 65.4% |
| No. of lecturers | 63 |
| No. of streams | 3 (Humanities/Commerce/Science) |
| No. of Disciplines | 13 (English, Hindi, History, Political Science, Geography, Education, Economics, Commerce, Physics, Chemistry, Botany, Zoology, Mathematics) |
| Co-Curricular activities | NCC/NSS/Rover and Rangers |
