= Namsang, Arunachal Pradesh =

Tehsil in Arunachal Pradesh, India

Coordinates: 27.11°N 95.51°E

Namsang is a tehsil in the Indian state of Arunachal Pradesh. It is in the Tirap district.

== See also ==
- List of constituencies of Arunachal Pradesh Legislative Assembly
- Arunachal Pradesh Legislative Assembly
