= Nocte language =

Language used in North-eastern states, India

Nocte
- Native to: India
- Ethnicity: Nocte
- Native speakers: (33,000 cited 2001 census)
- Language family: Sino-Tibetan: Brahmaputran; Northern Naga; Tangsa–Nocte; Nocte

Language codes
- ISO 639-3: njb
- Glottolog: noct1238
- ELP: Nocte Naga

Nocte is a Northern Naga language of northeastern India. Alternate names include Borduria, Jaipuria, Mohongia, Namsangia, Nocte, Nokte, and Paniduria (Ethnologue).

== Dialects ==
- Bote Naga
- Hakhi Naga
- Hakhun
- Hame Naga
- Hasik Naga
- Hathim Naga
- Khapa
- Laju (Ollo Naga)
- Lama Naga

== Geographical distribution ==
According to Ethnologue, Nocte is spoken in the following locations.

- Khonsa, Namsang, and Laju circles of Tirap district, southeastern Arunachal Pradesh
- Changlang district, southeastern Arunachal Pradesh
- Jaipur, Lakhimpur district, Assam
