= Nocte people =

Tibeto-Burmese ethnic group in Arunachal Pradesh, India

Arunachal Nocte Naga
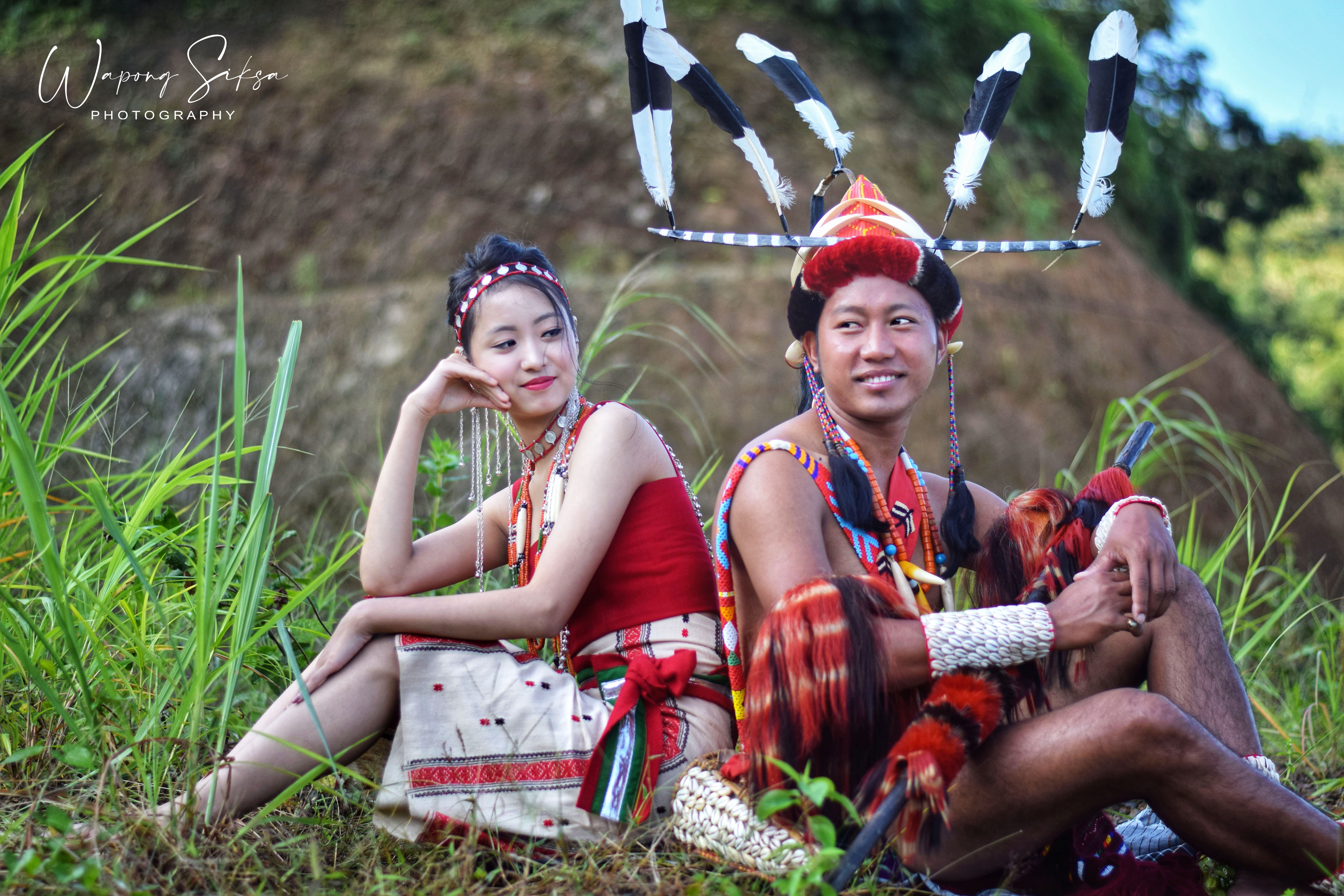
- Nocte traditional attire

Total population
- 111,679

Regions with significant populations
- Tirap District, Arunachal Pradesh: 111,679

Languages
- Nocte, Assamese, English

Religion
- Christianity, Hinduism, Animism

Related ethnic groups
- Wancho, Konyak, Naga tribes

The Nocte people, are a Naga tribe living primarily in Northeast Indian state of Arunachal Pradesh. They number about 111,679 (Census 2011), mainly living in the Patkai hills of Tirap district of Arunachal Pradesh, India. Ethnically related to the Konyak Naga, their origins can be traced back to the Hukong Valley in Myanmar, from where they migrated to India in the 15th and 16th centuries.

Their chiefs who were originally known as Ang exert control over the village with their council, the "Ngoang-Wang" (modern-day cabinet). Since they did not have an army under their control they would consult trusted family (lowang-tang) on crucial matters. The Chief also consult village elders and priests on all important socio-religious ceremonies.

== Terminology ==
The term Nocte was coined in the 1950s. It has been derived from two words: Nok, which means village, and Tey, which means people. In the medieval and colonial period, the Nocte people were called Noga or Naga due to their shared ethnic ties with the Naga people of Nagaland. As per the location of the village, the Ahoms termed the Noctes as Namsangya or Namsangia, Borduaria or Bor Duris, and Paniduaria.

== Tea gardens from the colonial era ==
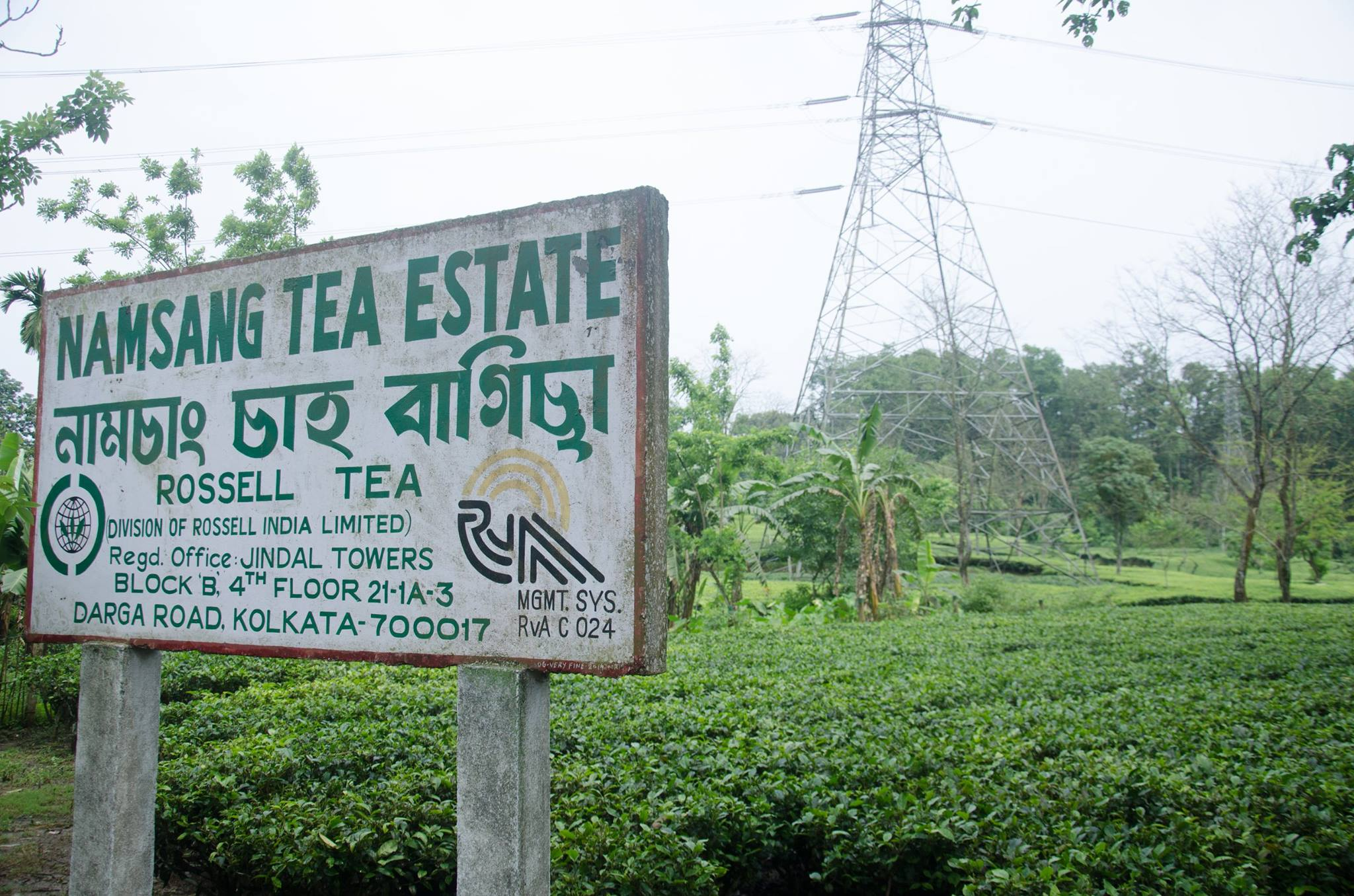
Namsang Tea Estate board | Photo by Teabox

In 1776, Sir Joseph Banks, a British botanist, recommended for the first time that tea cultivation should be taken up in India. Four years later, in 1780, Robert Kyd, who founded the botanical garden at Kolkata in 1787, started experimenting with tea cultivation in India with consignments of seeds which arrived from China. Decades later, in 1815, Colonel Latter, a British army officer, reported that the Singpho people gathered an indigenous species of tea, and ate its leaves with oil and garlic. In 1820s, Maniram Dutta Baruah informed the British cultivators—Major Robert Bruce and his brother Charles Alexander Bruce—about the indigenous tea growing in the jungles of the Nocte and the Singpho countries, which was hitherto unknown to the rest of the world.

In or around 1833–34, Namsang and Hukanjuri tea gardens were taken up by the British on account of the indigenous tea growing on them. The land belonged to the Namsang Chief and was also claimed by the Borduria Chief. These gardens became operational from October 1840. The gardens are now under Assam's Jeypore area of Dibrugarh district. Teams of wild elephants were harnessed to clear the dense forest, toppling trees with a girth of 25 feet. In 1838, India's first twelve chests of manufactured tea, made from the indigenous tea, were shipped to London and were sold at the London auctions. This paved the way for the formation of the Bengal Tea Association in Kolkata and the first joint stock tea company, the Assam Company, in London. Ironically, the native plants flourished, while the Chinese seedlings struggled to survive in the intense Assam heat and it was eventually decided to make subsequent plantings with seedlings from the native tea bush.

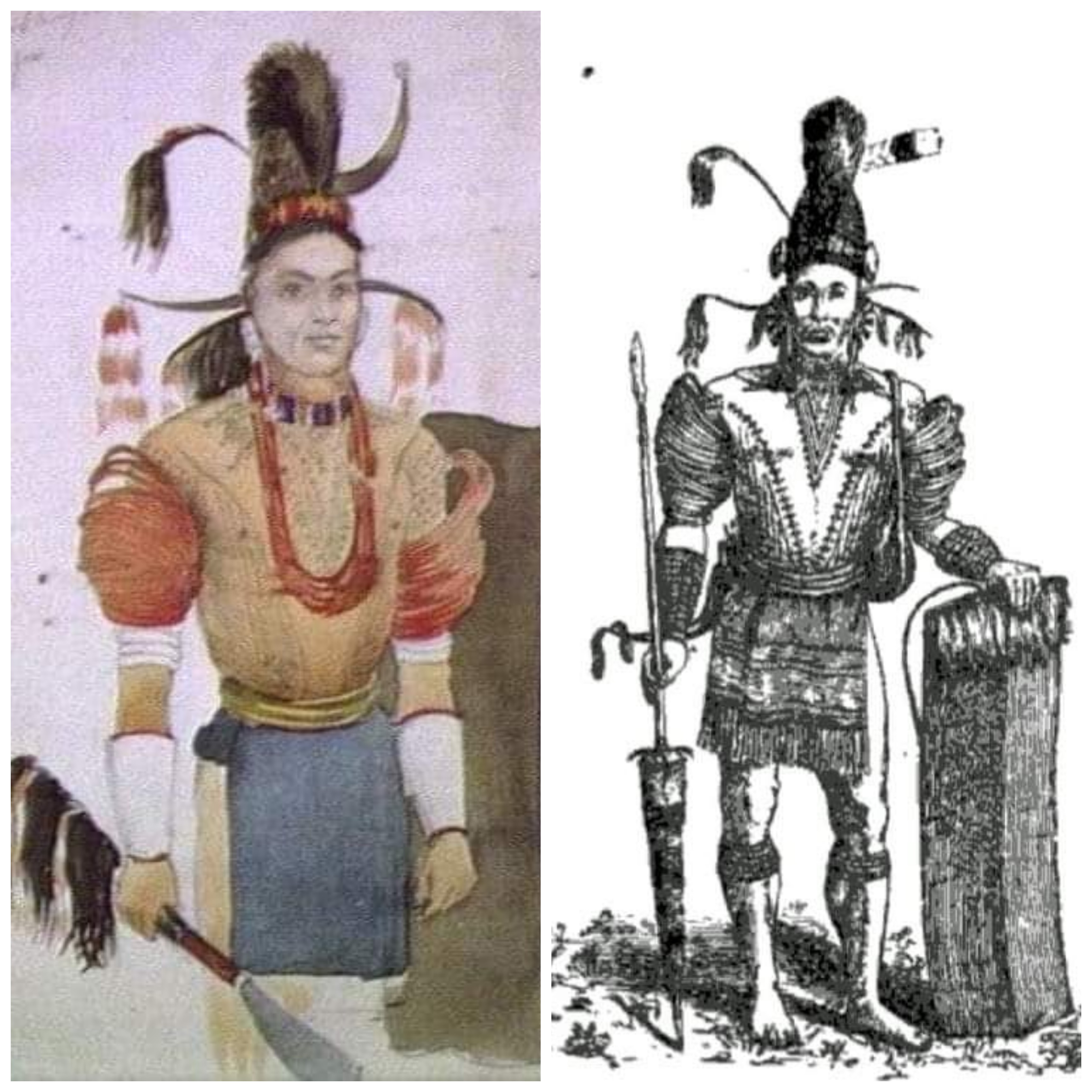
1875 coloured sketch of Wang Bang, Chief of Namsang; and sketch of Wang Man, Chief of Borduria. The sketches were done by Lt. R.G. Woodthrope.

The people from Namsang and Borduria worked willingly for the company and were paid in kind, and the Chiefs received "douceurs" from the Managers of the Assam Company. About the year 1861–62, these gardens were transferred to the Northern Assam Company, and the Namsang Chief was taken to Nazira for the purpose of being informed that the lands were about to be transferred to other proprietors. He received a further "douceur" of Rs. 1,000 and presents; and "from that time to the present (1873), owing to his power to retain possession as against the Borduria Chief, he has been undoubtedly recognized as the landlord."

These gardens were the subject of correspondence between the Government of British India and the Bengal Government. At that time, the present-day Northeast India was under the Bengal Government. As per a 1876 report, ever since the gardens were transferred to the Assam Company on the relinquishment of the government undertaking, the Assam Company paid yearly subsidies of Rs. 200-250 each to the Chief. The gardens changed hands often, but the owners always continued to pay the subsidy till 1873, when a Mr. Minto was the owner. About this time, the Namsang Chief was reported to have assumed a threatening attitude in connection with the gardens, and on Mr. Minto's representations to the contrary, the anomalous position of the gardens came to light. After two years of negotiation, the Namsang Chief and the Government of British India reached an agreement, and the latter sanctioned this settlement,---vide letter No. 1943P., dated 6 July 1875. The terms of agreement were:

1. That the Namsang Chief shall receive an annual subsidy of Rs. 450 for ever---this being the sum Mr. Minto paid to them.

2. That this payment shall cover claims not only in respect of the tea gardens of Hukanjuri and Namsang, but of all the tract of country which will come within the "Inner Line," and over which the Namsangias have hitherto asserted rights.

3. The Namsang Chief was also granted a license for obtaining arms and ammunition.

== Historical books ==
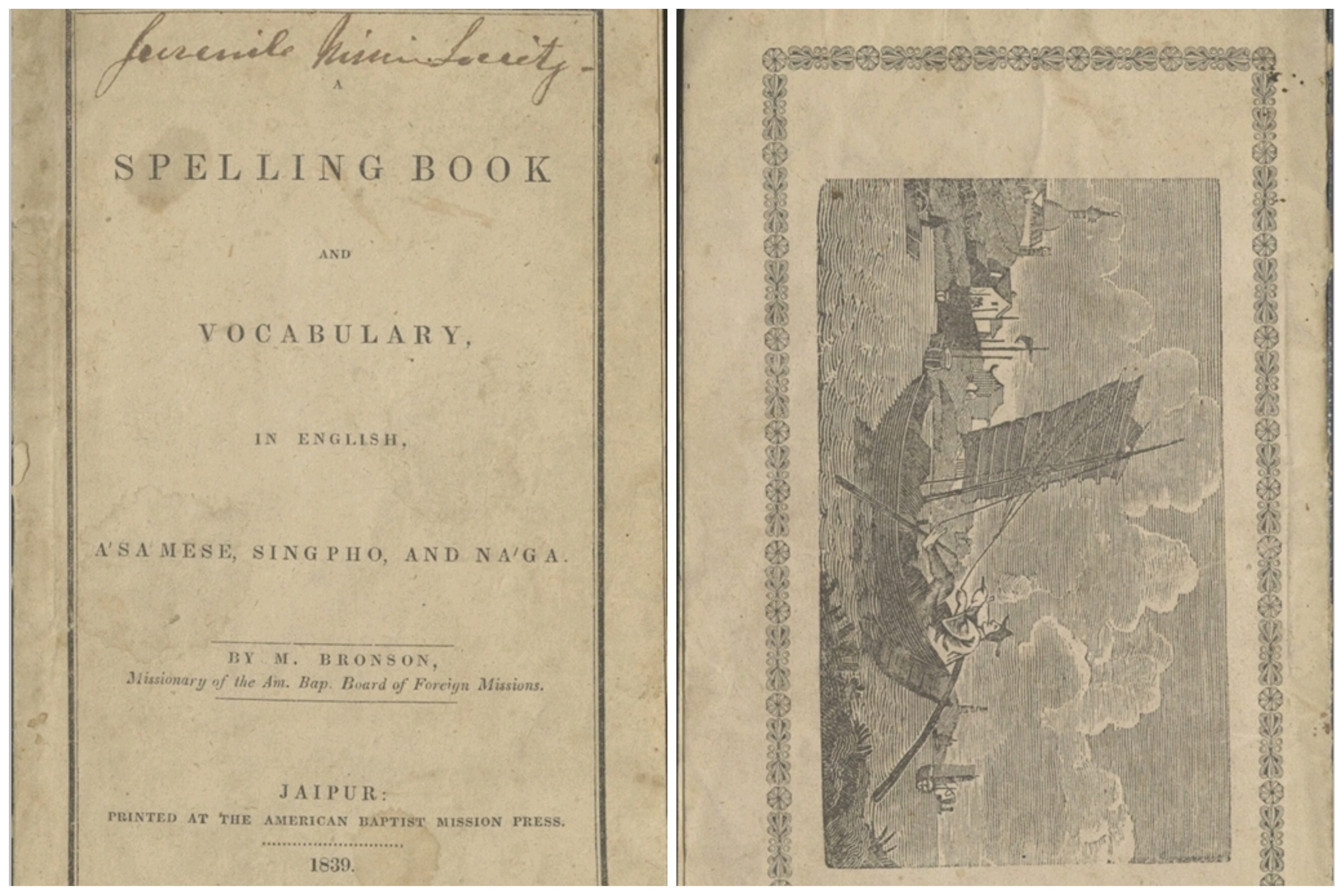
L-R: View of cover and backcover of the book.

In 1839, the first book on the Nocte people was written and published. Titled, "A spelling book and vocabulary in English, Assamese, Singpho and Naga", the book was authored by Miles Bronson, the American Baptist Missionary who lived with the Nocte people from January 1839 to October 1840. A 66-page book, it consists of more than 730 vocabularies and 47 reading lessons each in Nocte (Naga), Singpho, Assamese and English languages. As per the records, 500 copies of the book were printed at the American Baptist Mission Press, Jeypore, Assam.

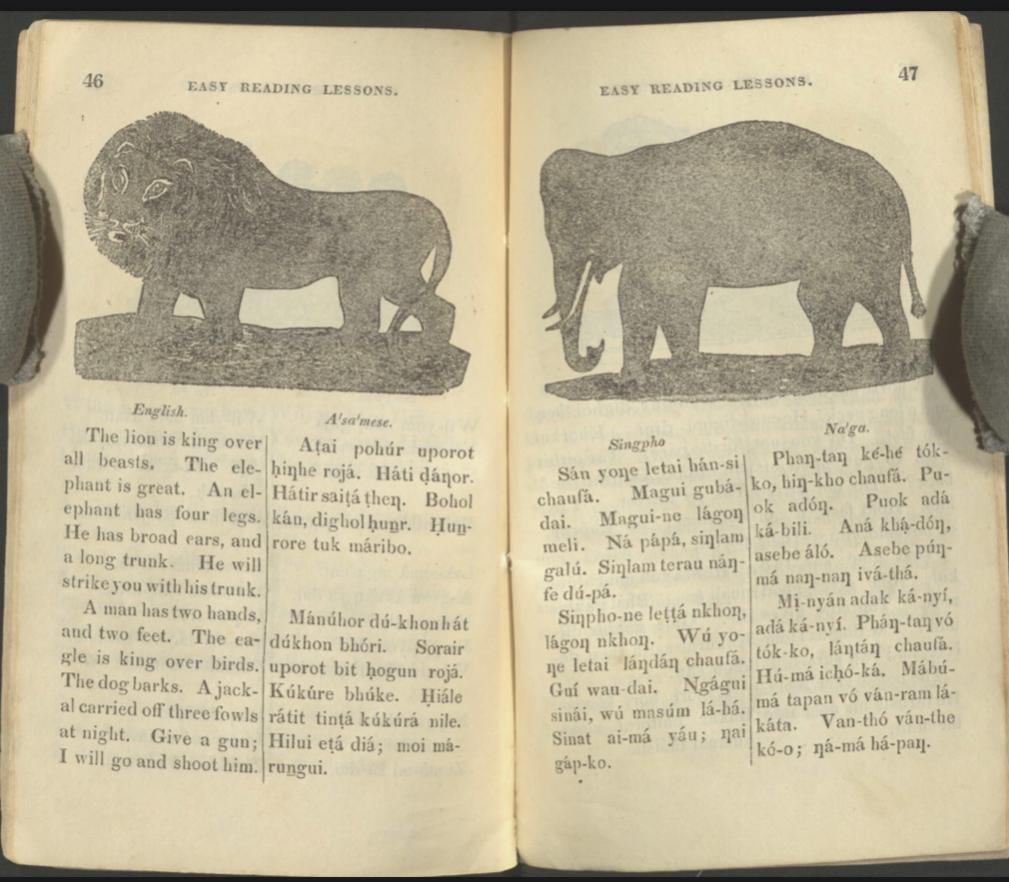
Sample of one of the reading lessons

With the help of Prof. Stephen Morey of La Trobe University, Australia, Dr. Rikker Dockum of Swarthmore College, USA, and Dr. Luke Lindemann of Yale University, USA, Nocte Digest editor, Shri Wangtum Humchha Lowang, acquired the book in a digital format on 31 July 2021, from the Beinecke Rare Books & Manuscript Library of Yale University, Connecticut, USA.

== Religion ==
The last ruler of united Namsang, Borduria and all the Nocte Naga villagers under the Ang of Namsang and Ang of Borduria, including those friendly villagers of the Wancho area of now Longding district, Lotha Khunbao was known for his spirituality and accepted tenets of Vaishnavism in the early 15th Century. He was named "Narottam", meaning the best among men, by Baal, the Gukhai of the Bare Ghar Satra. In 1972, Lt. Governor Col. KAA Raja honored Lotha Khunbao by naming (Namsang-mukh) as 'Narottam Nagar', where now, the institution, Ramakrishna Mission School was established and funded by Namsang-Borduria Fund (from the revenue arising out of Namsang and Borduria people reserve Forest). A picture of the chief and his wife is also available in the British Archive Museum. This has brought them closer to the Hindu culture of much of the rest of India. The 1961 census reported some Buddhists among the Nocte. The Nocte were followers of Theravada Buddhism and Animism, although they have adopted Hinduism since the 15th Century, under the influence of Narottom Baap or Shankardeva. Traditionally, Nocte Naga believed in Nature worship. All cosmic power was known as 'Jauban' and worshiped. Their animist religiosity was akin to the "Native American". After death, the spirit of the mighty Chief becomes 'Laa' or mighty Eagle. Other malevolent and benevolent deities are also worshipped as well. Offerings of food and water are given to the gods in order to appease them.

The Noctes from Namsang village were the first to come in contact with Christianity when American Baptist missionary Miles Bronson visited the village in January 1839 and lived there with his family till the second half of 1840. Bronson's primary objective was to convert the Noctes into Christianity and set up school. He and his wife succeeded in opening a school and even printed several books in Romanized Nocte. However, the missionaries failed to convert the ethnic group into Christianity as they refused to abandon their own religion.

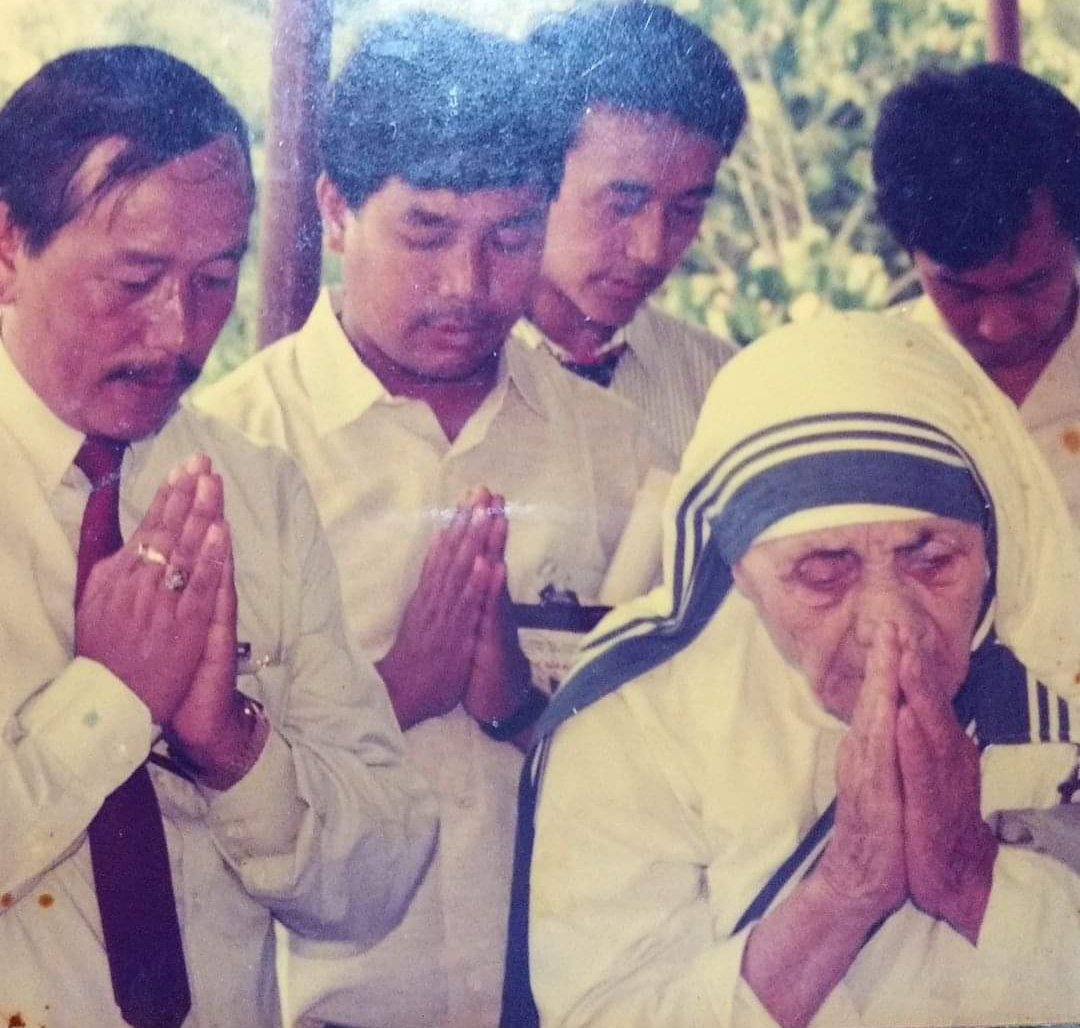
Mother Teresa at Borduria praying with James Lowangcha Wanglat, former Home Minister of Arunachal Pradesh.

Christianity was successfully introduced in the late 20th Century. On 2 August 1993, Mother Teresa visited Borduria village and inaugurated the first Catholic Church of Arunachal Pradesh. It was the only place visited by her in the state. She also laid the foundation for the House for Missionaries of Charity (MC) Sisters.

Of late, Baptist missionaries have converted about one-fifth to one-third of the Nocte to Christianity, principally those living in Khonsa. One Buddhist Channel in 2010 claimed there were no Christians anywhere in Arunachal Pradesh province in 1951, which seems to indicate that this conversion to Christianity largely happened in the latter half of the 20th century with continuation into the 21st century.

== Culture ==
"Chalo-Loku" (Harvesting Festival or thanks, giving festival), the Nocte Naga had 14 "loku"; the most important 'loku' was "Chalo-loku". While most "Loku" of the Nocte-Naga last between 1 and 2 days; "Chalo-loku" has to last for 3 days to complete all rituals that go with this particular festival. The festival, which lasts for three days, involves the slaughter of cattle, entertainment and the gathering of food on the first day.

The second day, known as Chamkatja is an enactment of empowering the four distinctive "Clans", the "Lotung-som Cham", 'Matey-som Cham', 'Khetey-som' Cham and 'Nook Pang-mi Cham" (the Nook Pangmi-Cham warriors will be led by the "Tang-dong Lowang". This brand of youths was furious warriors. While returning from the "Nook-Pangmi-Chaam" every member of the village must give right of way to these warriors; even by the mighty chief & his family. The warriors would be received for a powerful enactment of warrior dance by the mighty Chief in his house with the best rice beers. The first 'Cham-kat" of the young Chief will not go to his clan 'Cham' but join the "Nook-Pangmi-Cham" under the care of "Tangdong-Lowang". Last day of the festival is called "Than-lang-jaa". Before the dance 'Chin-lit' ceremonies are performed by the maternal family. As an act of blessing and to ward off evil spirit fresh single ginger necklace is garland by the female members of the maternal clan. "Woo-soak" ceremony is also performed on the last day by the chief assisted by 'tan-waa' (priest) village elders "Ngoan-Wang" and council members to understand the fortunes of the new year by reading the formation of eggs tenderly pouring the eggs yolk on a specific type of leaves called "Nyap-lin". The eggs have to be fresh and collected from the village. The first eggs would be for the Chief and his family/clan, 2nd eggs will be for selecting the next 'jhum' to be cultivated (both Namsang & Borduria has 12 jhum' properly ear-marked. They will break as many eggs is required till the best 'jhum' land is selected as shown by the formation of the fresh 'egg'. After a 'jhum' is selected the council of Wiseman will also see the prosperity of the "Sala-jaah and Thingyan-Jaah" the last egg would be for the good omen of going to the plains for trade and labor contract works. The festival is then concluded with dancing around the village singing romantic songs, the climax of the festival would be the fast rhythmic movement called the "Kepa-boong". During this dance, the chief singer will evoke the holy spirit to bless the village until the next festivity.

== Food ==
The Nocte are agriculturalists and practice meal planning in their daily diet. Main crops include rice, maize and leafy vegetables. The staple food of the Nocte is rice. They consume a wide variety of meat, including fish. Previously, a local liquor brewed from a mixture of rice, tapioca and millet was quite popular. These days, tea has also gained popularity in the Nocte community.

== Dress ==
The menfolk have a tendency to shave their hair in the frontal part of the head, and the back tuft of hair is tied into a chignon just above the nape. The womenfolk will keep their long auburn tresses tied into a bun kept at the back of the neck, although the widow will cut their hair short on the condition if they do not remarry. Like the Wancho, they tattoo their faces and bodies.

Owing to the humid climate, the menfolk will wear a loincloth in front with cane belts, which act as a waistband. Bamboo slips and armlets made of ivory are worn on all four limbs as well. The womenfolk tend to wear a short cotton skirt that measures from the waist to knees, and a blouse is worn to cover the upper body. The goats' horns act as earlobes, although ornaments include metal bangles and earrings are worn.

== Lifestyle ==
The Nocte construct houses made of silts, bamboos and palm leaves for roofs, although the chief's houses are constructed with carved massive blocks and wooden pillars. Dormitories are provided for bachelors and unmarried women separately. According to their tradition, it is a place where the elders teach children about traditional mythology, folklore, and religion. In cases of Christian families, Christian teachings are also mixed with traditional teachings as well, which is evident among Catholic converts. The chiefs are addressed in either of the two titles: Namsang and Borduria.

The dormitory of a bachelor is known as a "Poh", while a bachelorettes' one is known as a "Yanpo". However, women are not permitted to enter the boys’ dormitory, although the reverse is permitted. Dormitories are built upon wooden raised piles, usually measuring four feet above the ground. The bachelors' dormitories are decorated with human skulls taken in headhunting, which are used for containing large log drums carved out from wooden logs. The drum, known as 'thum' or 'log-drum'. However, with the advancement of Western education, it has been witnessed that these practices are in decline. Headhunting, which once proved to be popular among the Nocte, has been banned in 1940 although the last head-hunting was noted in 1991 amongst the Wancho.

== Hygiene issues ==
The Nocte followed an age-old tradition of keeping bodies of the deceased relatives in the open, either near a river or just outside their houses. The Nocte Christians, like most Nocte, would keep their body exposed for three days in their homes.

Inevitably, the decomposed bodies would attract bacteria, insects, and germs lying in the open that produced a terrible stench. This was the cause of the frequent outbreaks of health-threatening diseases. Owing to public health education by reformers, the burial of the deceased in proper coffins has completely supplanted this traditional rite since 2004. The Kheti village, which is not far removed from Khonsa, was the last village to give up this practice in the modern Nocte society.
