= Wancho people =

Tribe in Arunachal Pradesh, India

Wancho
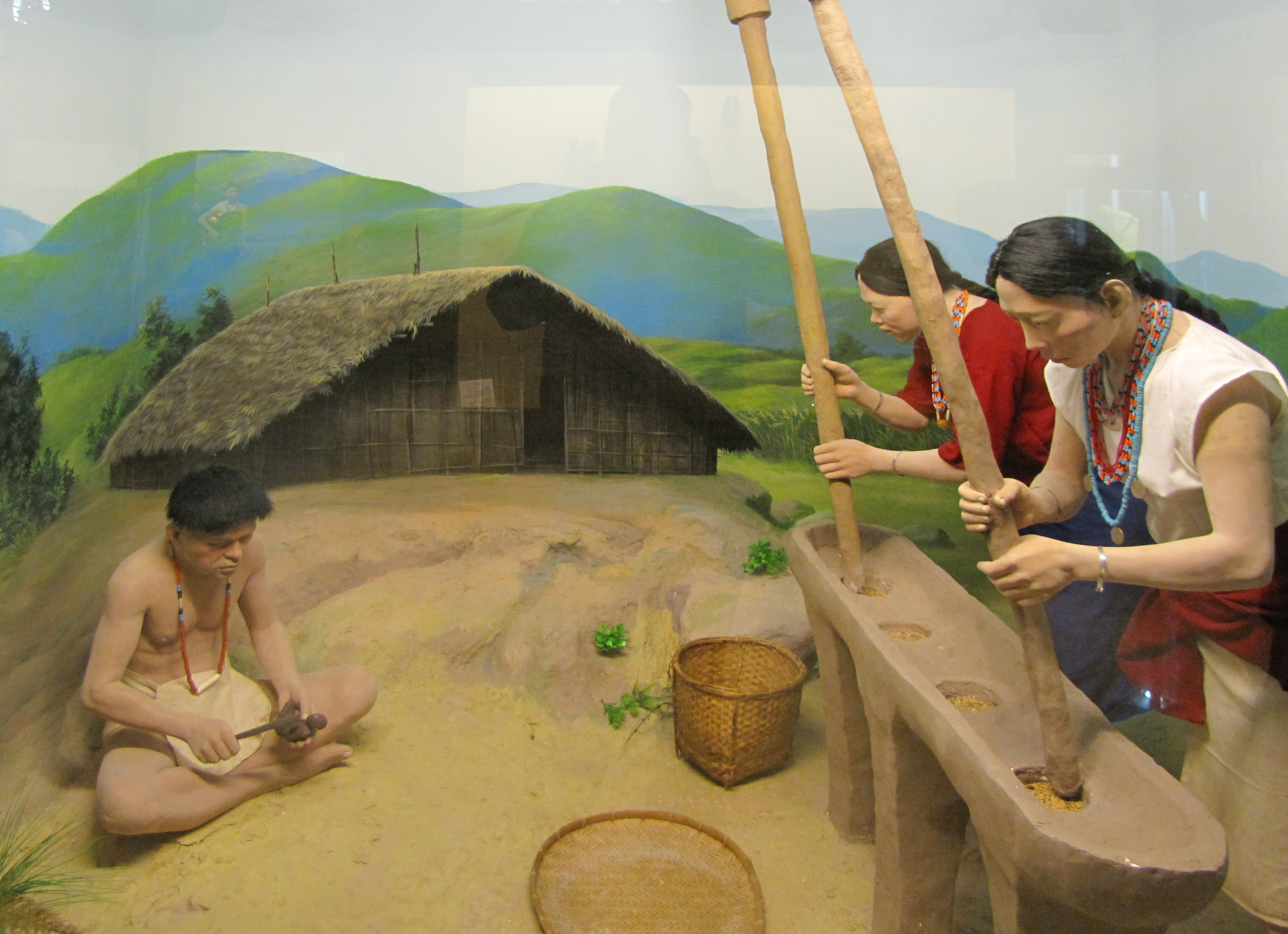
- Diorama and wax figures of Wancho people in Jawaharlal Nehru Museum, Itanagar.

Total population
- 56,866 (2011 census)

Regions with significant populations
- India (Arunachal Pradesh)

Languages
- Wancho

Religion
- Christianity, Animism, Hinduism

Related ethnic groups
- Naga, Nocte, Konyak

The Wancho people, also known as the Wancho Naga, are a Tibeto-Burmese indigenous ethnic group inhabiting the Patkai hills of Longding district in the Northeast Indian state of Arunachal Pradesh. The Wancho language belongs to the Tibeto-Burman family under Northern Naga languages.

== Origin ==
Wancho Naga are ethnically related to the Nocte of Arunachal Pradesh and Konyak of Nagaland.

== Religion ==
Unlike other Naga, the Wancho, together with the Nocte and a small minority of the Konyak, still retain the belief of Animism. These Animist Wancho believe in the existence of two powerful deities, Rang and Baurang.

Christianity has gained some followers among the Wancho, many of whom belong to the Baptist or Catholic denominations. Acceptance of Christianity has largely to do with influence from the Nagas of Nagaland, as well as changing perspectives towards headhunting. However, this has also resulted in the decline in many aspects of their traditional culture, which has strong associations with religion.

As per the 2001 census, 10% of the Wancho claimed to be Hindu and 16% Animist. By the time of the 2011 census, only 2.55% of the Wancho claimed to be Hindu and 0.55% Animist.

== Culture ==
Tattooing plays an important part in Wancho culture. According to tradition, a man is tattooed on his four limbs and his entire face, with the exception of certain regions around the eyes and the lips. The women adorn themselves with necklaces and bangles, along with some light tattooing as well.

The prime festival of the Wancho is Oriah, a spring festival held in March or April, for a period of six to twelve days, interspersed with prayer, songs and dances. Villagers exchange bamboo tubes filled with rice beer as a mark of greeting and goodwill. Pork skin is then offered to the village chief as a mark of respect. This festival continues for several days as jhum paddies are sown, pigs, buffaloes and gayals are sacrificed, and feasts are arranged in each and every murung (dormitory). Boys and girls, wearing ceremonial costumes, sing and dance during Oriah. People dance around a "Jangban", a long ceremonial pole planted during Oriah. A common day for celebrating Oriah began in 1975, with the government of Arunachal Pradesh eventually fixing the day to be 16 February.

== Lifestyle ==
The Wancho are traditionally governed by a council of elderly chieftains, known as Wangham or Wangsa.
