= Rajiv Gandhi University =

Central university in Doimukh, Arunachal Pradesh, India

- Former name: Arunachal University
- Motto: Knowledge Imparts Immortality
- Type: Public central university
- Established: 4 February 1984; 42 years ago
- Affiliations: UGC; NAAC; AIU; ACU; NMC
- Chancellor: Dr. J. Suresh Babu, IAS (Retd.)
- Vice-Chancellor: Dr. Shivaraj
- Rector: Governor of Arunachal Pradesh
- Visitor: President of India
- Faculty: 209
- Administrative staff: 256
- Students: 4500
- Location: Rono Hills, Doimukh, Arunachal Pradesh, India; 27°08′50″N 93°46′01″E
- Campus: Rural, 302 acres
- Website: www.rgu.ac.in

Rajiv Gandhi University (RGU), formerly Arunachal University, is the oldest and only central university in the Indian state of Arunachal Pradesh. It occupies a 302-acre tableland at Rono Hills near Doimukh, in Papum Pare district, roughly 25 km from the state capital Itanagar. The campus road branches from National Highway 52A and crosses the Dikrong river before climbing into the forested hills above the Brahmaputra valley. In March 2024, the National Assessment and Accreditation Council (NAAC) awarded the university an 'A' grade with a cumulative grade point average of 3.02 out of 4, valid until 13 March 2029.

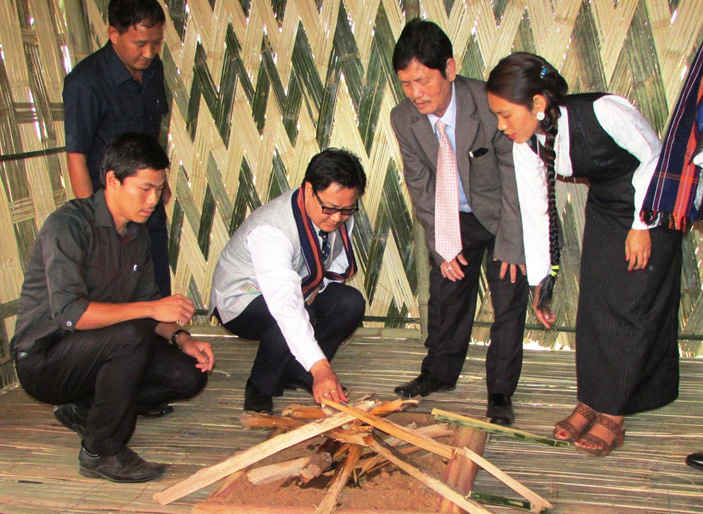
Then Minister of State for Home Affairs Kiren Rijiju inaugurating the Arunachal Pradesh Panorama Festival at RGU, March 2015

== Background ==
When Arunachal Pradesh was still a union territory of India, its colleges had no local university to affiliate with. Degree-level affiliation fell under the jurisdiction of North Eastern Hill University (NEHU) in Shillong, Meghalaya, meaning that degree-granting authority for students in Arunachal Pradesh rested with an institution more than 400 km away in another state, with no campus or administrative presence in the territory itself.

Arunachal Pradesh attained statehood on 20 February 1987 under the 55th Amendment to the Constitution of India, becoming the 24th state of India. The university had been founded three years earlier, during the chief ministership of Gegong Apang.

== History ==
=== Foundation and early years ===
Prime Minister Indira Gandhi laid the foundation stone on 4 February 1984 at Rono Hills, establishing what was then called Arunachal University as a state institution. The University Grants Commission extended academic recognition under Section 2(f) of the UGC Act on 28 March 1985, and the university began formally functioning from 1 April 1985, though classroom teaching did not begin until the 1988–89 academic session. Financial recognition under Section 12B of the UGC Act followed on 25 March 1994.

The first years were lean. Teaching started with 48 students, 18 faculty, and three departments: History, Political Science, and Education. Prof. C. L. Anand was appointed the first Vice-Chancellor in 1987. After his term, Madan Jha (IAS) and S. Regunathan (IAS) served in acting capacities in 1992 and 1993 respectively, before Prof. A. C. Bhagabati became the next substantive Vice-Chancellor in 1993.

=== Renaming and elevation to central university ===
In 2005, during a visit to Arunachal Pradesh by UPA Chairperson Sonia Gandhi to mark the state's statehood anniversary, the institution was renamed Rajiv Gandhi University after the former Prime Minister Rajiv Gandhi. On 9 April 2007, the Ministry of Education converted it to a central university, bringing substantially greater federal funding and transferring its affiliated colleges away from the NEHU system. Prof. Tamo Mibang, a long-serving professor at the Arunachal Institute of Tribal Studies, is credited by the university with having played a central role in this transition; he later served as Vice-Chancellor from December 2012 to August 2018, the first person from Arunachal Pradesh to hold such a post at any central university.

== Campus ==
The campus occupies 302 acres of forested hillside in Papum Pare district, overlooking the Dikrong river. It lies 6.5 km from the national highway and is accessed via the Dikrong Bridge. The university maintains a standing ban on tree-cutting and bird hunting within its boundaries, has planted hundreds of trees in recent years, and was declared a plastic-free zone in 2021. Eight rooftop solar plants were installed through the Arunachal Pradesh Energy Development Agency, and an emergency 250-kilowatt generating set and eleven bore wells supplement the grid supply.

The central library holds around 54,519 volumes and provides access to approximately 5,587 e-journals alongside print journal subscriptions. Campus connectivity is provided by a 1 Gbps National Knowledge Network link commissioned through ERNET India.

NAAC assessors have noted that the campus sits in a zone of geopolitical significance, since Arunachal Pradesh shares international boundaries with China and Bhutan, and the presence of a centrally funded university here has long been part of India's institutional investment in its northeastern frontier.

== Academics ==
The university has grown from its original three departments to cover life sciences, environmental sciences, social sciences, engineering and technology, commerce and management, education, languages, agricultural sciences, and sports sciences. In the five years leading to the 2024 annual report, the total number of departments roughly doubled and student intake rose by nearly 100 per cent. Ten new departments were added in a single expansion, including agricultural sciences and physical education. The Faculty of Sports Sciences was established with Ministry of Sports support and comprises five departments with twenty-five sanctioned posts.

Admission to most programmes is through the CUET at undergraduate level and CUET-PG at postgraduate level, followed by counselling, with a demand ratio that consistently exceeds 1:5. Sixty per cent of seats are reserved for Scheduled Tribe candidates, reflecting the state's demographic profile. A substantial share of students are first-generation learners from tribal communities across Arunachal Pradesh and neighbouring northeastern states; the university provides remedial classes and guided self-study courses to support them.

The university has 41 affiliated colleges covering arts, commerce, science, education, law, medical science, nursing, and homoeopathy, all previously affiliated to NEHU. Notable affiliated colleges include Dera Natung Government College in Itanagar, Jawaharlal Nehru College in Pasighat, and Wangcha Rajkumar Government College in Deomali. The Institute of Distance Education serves working professionals and students in remote parts of the state. Three extension campuses have been planned: at Baliso in Pakke-Kessang district, at Aalo in West Siang district, and at Namphai in Changlang district.

== Research ==
Research is concentrated in areas shaped by the university's geography and social context. The Faculty of Life Sciences was recognised by the UGC in 2003 under the scheme "Centre with Potential for Excellence in Particular Area" for biodiversity research, completing two consecutive five-year phases under that designation. Funding has come from the UGC, the Department of Science and Technology (DST), the Department of Biotechnology (DBT), and the Indian Council of Social Science Research (ICSSR). In 2021, the DST awarded the university Rs 10 crore under the PURSE programme.

The Arunachal Institute of Tribal Studies (AITS) signed a memorandum of understanding with the state research directorate in October 2020 for heritage documentation and the formulation of a State Culture Policy, one of relatively few such university-government arrangements in India. The Government of Arunachal Pradesh has also commissioned the university to document individuals from the state who resisted British colonial incursion. RGU is a member of the Consortium of Himalayan Central Universities, a UGC STRIDE-funded collaboration supported by NITI Aayog. NITI Aayog also selected the university to establish an Atal Community Incubation Centre for entrepreneurship and capacity-building among unemployed youth.

The university holds memoranda of understanding with Ritsumeikan University in Kyoto, Japan; the University of Missouri, USA; Semnan University, Iran; and the University of South Florida. A dedicated Centre for Endangered Languages (CFEL), established with UGC sponsorship, undertakes field research and documentation of tribal languages and has collaborated on language documentation workshops. A Women Technology Park on campus provides practical training in mushroom cultivation, sericulture, modified loom weaving, and ornamental fish rearing.

== Notable faculty ==
Tamo Mibang (1 July 1955 – 6 August 2022), from the Adi community of West Siang district, joined the then Arunachal University as a reader in history in 1988 and spent 41 years at the institution. He served as Vice-Chancellor from December 2012 to August 2018, the first person from Arunachal Pradesh to lead a central university and authored sixteen books and forty-six research papers in international and national journals. The Asiatic Society of Kolkata awarded him its gold medal in 2017 for his contributions to ethnology and folklore. He was the chief consultant for The Tribal Transition: Cultural Innovations in Arunachal Pradesh, a collaborative project with the School of Oriental and African Studies, the British Museum, and the Centre for Cross-Cultural Research and Documentation (2002–2007).

Anvita Abbi, a Padma Shri recipient and winner of the Kenneth Hale Award of the Linguistic Society of America, served as a visiting research professor at RGU and contributed to the university's endangered language documentation programme. Her broader work includes the identification of a sixth language family of India and the documentation of the Great Andamanese language.

Tomo Riba from [Galo tribe) born in 1961 at [Disi village, Basar, Leparada District served as Registrar of Rajiv Gandhi University and the first Vice Chancellor of Arunachal Pradesh University, Pasighat, the lone State government University of Arunachal Pradesh)]

== Accreditation and rankings ==
In March 2024, NAAC awarded the university an 'A' grade with a CGPA of 3.02 out of 4 following inspection by a seven-member peer team in February of that year. It was the third cycle of accreditation, valid until 13 March 2029. In 2020, the then Ministry of Human Resource Development ranked the university second among all central universities in India, with a score of 83 per cent in performance grading, and it received the "Best Central University" title at the Himalayan Educators Summit. In the National Institutional Ranking Framework (NIRF) 2021, the university placed in the 101–150 band in the University category. The NIRF 2025 exercise placed it in the 151–200 band.

== Student life ==
The student body is drawn primarily from Arunachal Pradesh's tribal communities, giving the campus a cultural character unlike most Indian universities. The annual Arunachal Panorama festival brings together displays of indigenous housing styles, traditional clothing, folk songs, and dances from across the state's tribes. The inter-college Unifest runs over four days and covers sports, literary competitions, and cultural events, and the VC Trophy is an inter-college sporting competition held each year. The university runs units of the National Service Scheme and the National Cadet Corps alongside departmental outreach programmes.

The students' union, RGUSU, holds annual elections and operates alongside individual tribal students' associations maintained by different communities within the university.

== Alumni association ==
The Alumni Association of Rajiv Gandhi University (AARGU) was established under clause 39 of the Rajiv Gandhi University Act 2006. Because the university was the only degree-granting institution in the state for decades, its alumni base includes a significant proportion of Arunachal Pradesh's educated professional class, spanning civil administration, education, law, and public service.
