= Wancho language =

Language

Wancho
- 𞋒𞋀𞋉𞋃𞋕 वांचो
- The word 'Wancho' in Wancho script
- Native to: India
- Ethnicity: Wancho Naga
- Native speakers: 59,154 (2011 census)
- Language family: Sino-Tibetan: Tibeto-Burman; Sal; Konyak Chang; Konyak–Chang; Wancho
- Writing system: Wancho script Devanagari

Language codes
- ISO 639-3: nnp
- Glottolog: wanc1238
- ELP: Wancho Naga

Wancho (वांचो) is a Konyak language of north-eastern India. Wancho is spoken in 36 villages of southeastern Longding district, Tirap district, Arunachal Pradesh, as well as in Assam and Nagaland (Ethnologue). Alternate names include Banpara Naga, Joboka, Jokoba.

== People ==
Wancho is spoken by the Wancho people who have a population of 56,866 according to a 2011 consensus, and mainly populate the Indian state of Arunachal Pradesh. Although a minority, these inhabitants have a rich culture with rituals, ceremonial practices, religion, and various dialects of Wancho.

The Wancho Ngun sign, equivalent to Indian rupee (₹)

== Dialects ==
Ethnologue lists the following dialects of Wancho.

- Changnoi
- Bor Muthun (Bor Mutonia)
- Horu Muthun
- Kulung Muthun (Mithan)

There is significant variation among the dialects spoken in the upper and lower regions.

== Orthography ==
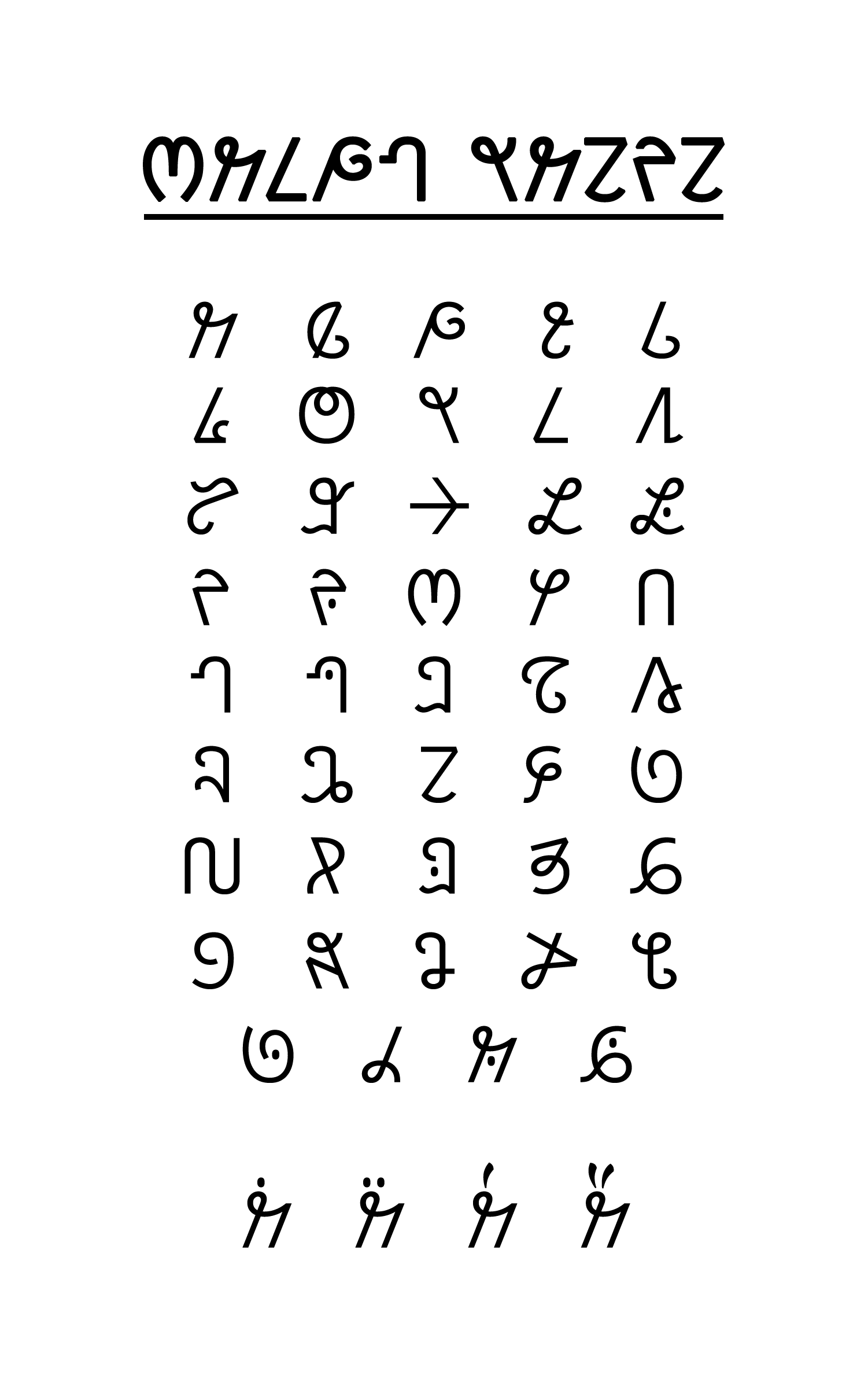
Wancho Alphabet Chart

Wancho is generally written in either Devanagari or Latin script. Between 2001 and 2012, teacher Banwang Losu devised a unique alphabetic Wancho script which is taught in some schools. In 2019, the script was officially published into Unicode 12.0.
