= Tirap district =

District in India

Coordinates: 26.9907°N 95.5028°E

- District of Arunachal Pradesh
- Location in Arunachal Pradesh
- Country: India
- State: Arunachal Pradesh
- Headquarters: Khonsa
- Town: Deomali

Area
  - Total: 1,170 km^{2} (450 sq mi)

Population (2011)
  - Total: 55,022
  - Density: 47.0/km^{2} (122/sq mi)

Demographics
  - Literacy: 52.2%
  - Sex ratio: 931
- Time zone: UTC+05:30 (IST)
- Website: tirap.nic.in

Tirap district (/tɪˈræp/) is a district located in the southeastern part of the state of Arunachal Pradesh in India. It shares a state border with Assam, an international border with Myanmar and a district border with Changlang and Longding.

== History ==
During World War II, the troops of Indian National Army, led by Subhash Chandra Bose and assisted by Japanese troops, liberated the area for a brief period in 1945, until the collapse of the Japanese Empire. The British colonial Allies of World War II had their Transit Camp at the Silombhu War Cave.

On 14 November 1987, Tirap was bifurcated to create the new Changlang district. In 2013 Tirap was again split to create Longding district.

Recently, Tirap has also been a major target for the NSCN, a Naga rebel group that aims for the creation of Greater Nagaland, using military force.

== Geography ==
Tirap district occupies an area of 2,362 square kilometres (912 sq mi), comparatively equivalent to Canada's Cornwall Island. The elevation ranges from 200 meters in the northwest to 4,000 meters in the Patkai Hills. After bifurcation the district occupied an area of 1,170 square km.

== Divisions ==
There are four Arunachal Pradesh Legislative Assembly constituencies located in this district: Namsang, Khonsa East, Khonsa-West, Borduria-Bogapani. All of them are a part of the Arunachal East Lok Sabha constituency.

== Demographics ==
According to the 2011 census, Tirap district has a population of 111,975, roughly equal to the nation of Grenada. This gives it a ranking of 613th in India (out of a total of 640). The district has a population density of 47 inhabitants per square kilometre (120/sq mi). Its population growth rate over the decade 2001–2011 was 11.63%. Tirap has a sex ratio of 931 females for every 1000 males, and a literacy rate of 52.23%.

=== Languages ===
Much of the tribal population consists of the Naga related Nocte, Konyak, and Wancho, who traditionally followed Animism, although most of them have converted to Christianity. Smaller communities of two other Naga tribes, Tutsa and Tangsa, besides non-Naga Singhpo can be found in the district as well. Festive fairs and festivals such as the Loku of the Nocte, Oriya, or Ojiyele of the Wancho and the Pongtu festival of the Tutsa are celebrated in full flair. Along with these festivals, Durga Puja is also celebrated here.

Languages of Tirap (2011)
1. Nocte (48.0%)
2. Tangsa (10.9%)
3. Garo (10.6%)
4. Hindi (7.30%)
5. Wancho (5.26%)
6. Bengali (3.77%)
7. Nepali (3.00%)
8. Assamese (2.36%)
9. Chang (1.37%)
10. Phom (1.16%)
11. Adi (1.11%)
12. Nyishi (1.07%)
13. Others (4.08%)

=== Religion ===
Religion in Tirap district (2011)
Religion	Per cent
Christianity	56.30%
Hinduism	31.65%
Rangfrah	9.7%
Islam	1.38%
Buddhism	0.97%

== Education ==
Most of the educational institutions in Tirap district are located in Deomali.

- Wangcha Rajkumar Government College, Deomali. It is the sole college in Tirap and Longding districts.
- Ramakrishna Mission School, Narottam Nagar, Deomali
- St. George School, Deomali
- Ramakrishna Sarada Mission School
