= List of districts in India =

Districts of India
- Category: second/third-level administrative division
- Location: States and union territories of India
- Number: 802 (as of 2026)
- Populations: Greatest: Thane, Maharashtra—11,060,148 (2011 census); Least: Dibang Valley, Arunachal Pradesh—8,004 (2011 census)
- Areas: Largest: Kutch, Gujarat—45,652 km^{2} (17,626 sq mi); Smallest: Mahé, Puducherry—8.69 km^{2} (3.36 sq mi)
- Densities: Highest: Central Delhi, Delhi (25,759/sq. km.); Lowest: Lower Dibang Valley, Arunachal Pradesh (14/sq. km.)
- Government: District Administration
- Subdivisions: Revenue division (Sub-division) and, Tehsil (Taluka, Mandal), and Blocks

A district (zila), also known as a revenue district, is an administrative division of an Indian state or union territory. In some cases, districts are further subdivided into subdivisions, and in others directly into tehsils or talukas. As of 9 December 2025, there are a total of 802 districts in India. This count includes Mahe and Yanam, which are Census districts rather than administrative districts as well as the temporary Maha Kumbh Mela district, but excludes the Itanagar Capital Complex, which has a Deputy Commissioner but is not an official district.

== District Administration ==
The District officials include

- District & Sessions Judge (Principal & additional), an officer of the Indian Judicial Service (state), responsible for justice and passing orders of imprisonment, including the death penalty and also have limited administrative power. Also have appellate jurisdiction over all subordinate courts in the district for both civil and criminal matters.
- District Magistrate or Deputy Commissioner or District Collector, an officer of the Indian Administrative Service, in charge of land revenue administration, disaster management, maintenance of public order, co-ordination, etc.
- Superintendent of Police or Senior Superintendent of Police or Deputy Commissioner of Police, an officer belonging to the Indian Police Service, responsible for maintaining law and order. Superintendent of Police is incharge of the police administration of the respective police district. The police district is either coterminous with the revenue/administrative district or divided into two within the revenue district.
- Deputy Conservator of Forests, an officer belonging to the Indian Forest Service, entrusted with the management of the forests, environment and wildlife of the district.
- Other district-level officials of respective state government departments, such as the District Educational Officer, District Medical Officer, District Supply Officer, District Fire Officer, District Development Commissioner, etc.

Each of these officials is aided by officers from the appropriate branch of the state government. Most districts have a distinct headquarters; but the metropolitan districts of Mumbai City in Maharashtra, Kolkata in West Bengal, Hyderabad in Telangana, and Chennai in Tamil Nadu are examples where there are no distinct district headquarters, although they have district collectors. These district headquarters are known as "Collectorates".

== Overview ==
Overview of districts; population figures according to 2011 census
State/UT	Districts	Total population	Population per district
States
Andhra Pradesh	28	49,577,103	1,770,611
Arunachal Pradesh	27	1,383,727	49,419
Assam	35	31,205,576	891,588
Bihar	38	104,099,452	2,739,459
Chhattisgarh	33	25,545,198	774,097
Goa	3	1,458,545	486,182
Gujarat	34	60,439,692	1,777,638
Haryana	23	25,351,462	1,102,237
Himachal Pradesh	12	6,864,602	572,050
Jharkhand	24	32,988,134	1,374,506
Karnataka	31	61,095,297	1,970,816
Kerala	14	33,406,061	2,386,147
Madhya Pradesh	55	72,626,809	1,274,155
Maharashtra	36	112,374,333	3,121,509
Manipur	16	2,570,390	160,649
Meghalaya	12	2,966,889	247,241
Mizoram	11	1,097,206	99,746
Nagaland	17	1,978,502	116,382
Odisha	30	41,974,218	1,399,141
Punjab	23	27,743,338	1,206,232
Rajasthan	41	68,548,437	1,671,913
Sikkim	6	610,577	101,763
Tamil Nadu	38	72,147,030	1,898,606
Telangana	33	35,003,674	1,060,717
Tripura	8	3,673,917	459,240
Uttar Pradesh	75	199,812,341	2,629,110
Uttarakhand	13	10,086,292	775,869
West Bengal	27	91,276,115	3,380,597
Union Territories
Andaman and Nicobar Islands	3	380,581	126,860
Chandigarh	1	1,055,450	1,055,450
Dadra Nagar Haveli, Daman and Diu	3	586,956	195,652
Jammu and Kashmir	20	12,258,093	612,905
Ladakh	8	290,492	41,499
Lakshadweep	1	64,473	64,473
Delhi	13	16,787,941	1,291,380
Puducherry	4	1,247,953	311,988
Total	800	1,210,576,856	1,552,022

Largest and smallest districts in India
	Largest District	Smallest District
By Land Area	Kutch district	Mahe district
By Population	North 24 Parganas district	Dibang Valley district

== Naming ==
The majority of districts in India take their names from the district headquarters (the principal town or administrative centre).

Not all districts are named after towns. Some districts are named for prominent geographical features (for example, river names), historical regions, or notable persons associated with the area. For example, Krishna district is named for the Krishna River that flows through the region, while Mahabubnagar (Palamoor) takes its name from the town of Mahbubnagar, itself named after Mir Mahabub Ali Khan.

Some districts have historically used two forms of names—a traditional or historical name and a name based on the modern administrative headquarters—and in many official usages the word "district" is appended to the name (for example, "Sonipat district") to distinguish the administrative unit from the town of the same name.

The reasons for district names and for changes to them can be administrative, political, cultural, or commemorative; new districts created during reorganisations are often named for their headquarters or for local landmarks, and the choice of name is normally made by the state government that creates the district.

== Similar names ==
=== Districts sharing their name with another district in India ===
- Aurangabad district, Bihar and Aurangabad district, Maharashtra
- Balrampur district, Chhattisgarh and Balrampur district, Uttar Pradesh
- Bijapur district, Chhattisgarh and Bijapur district, Karnataka (Note: On 1 November 2014, the district's name was changed to Vijayapura)
- Bilaspur district, Chhattisgarh and Bilaspur district, Himachal Pradesh
- Hamirpur district, Himachal Pradesh and Hamirpur district, Uttar Pradesh
- Pratapgarh district, Rajasthan and Pratapgarh district, Uttar Pradesh
- Raigarh district, Chhattisgarh and Raigad district, Maharashtra

=== Districts sharing their name with a district in a neighbouring country in South Asia ===
- Bhojpur district, Bihar shares a name with Bhojpur District, Nepal
- Daman district, Dadra and Nagar Haveli and Daman and Diu shares a name with Daman District, Afghanistan
- Dang district, Gujarat shares a name with Dang District, Nepal
- Ghaziabad district, Uttar Pradesh shares a name with Ghaziabad District, Afghanistan
- Gopalganj district, Bihar shares a name with Gopalganj District, Bangladesh
- Hyderabad district, Telangana shares a name with Hyderabad District, Pakistan
- Lalitpur district, Uttar Pradesh shares a name with Lalitpur District, Nepal
- Poonch district, Jammu and Kashmir, shares a name with Poonch District, Pakistan (the two were, prior to Partition, one district – which got split by the Line of Control, since then the two parts have been administered separately)

=== Districts sharing names with those outside of South Asia entirely ===
- Dhar district, Madhya Pradesh, with Dhar District, Yemen
- Banda district, Uttar Pradesh with Banda District, Republic of the Congo and Banda District, Ghana
- Mansa district, Punjab, with Mansa District, Zambia
- Salem district, Tamil Nadu with Salem, Massachusetts, United States, Salem, Brebes Regency, Indonesia, Salem, Oregon, United States
- Indore district, Madhya Pradesh with Indore, West Virginia
- Korea district, Chattisgarh with Korea

== States ==
The following tables list the population details of various states. The columns include the hierarchical administrative subdivision codes, the district name, district headquarters, 2011 census population, area in square kilometres, and the population density per square kilometre.

=== Andhra Pradesh (AP) ===
#	Code	District	Headquarters	Population (2021)	Area (km^{2})	Density (/km^{2})
1	AS	Alluri Sitharama Raju	Paderu	954,000	12,251	77.87
2	AK	Anakapalli	Anakapalli	1,727,000	4,292	402.38
3	AN	Ananthapuramu	Ananthapuramu	2,241,100	10,205	219.608
4	AM	Annamayya	Madanapalle	1,697,300	7,954	213.389
5	BP	Bapatla	Bapatla	1,587,000	3,829	414.47
6	CH	Chittoor	Chittoor	1,873,000	6,855	273.23
7	KN	Dr. B.R. Ambedkar Konaseema	Amalapuram	1,719,100	2,083	825.30
8	EG	East Godavari	Rajamahendravaram	1,832,300	2,561	715.46
9	EL	Eluru	Eluru	2,071,700	6,679	310.181
10	GU	Guntur	Guntur	2,091,000	2,443	855.9
11	KK	Kakinada	Kakinada	2,092,300	3,019	693.04
12	KR	Krishna	Machilipatnam	1,735,000	3,775	459.602
13	KU	Kurnool	Kurnool	2,271,700	7,980	284.67
14	NN	Nandyal	Nandyal	1,781,800	9,682	184.032
15	NE	Nellore	Nellore	2,469,700	10,441	236
16	NT	NTR	Vijayawada	2,218,000	3,316	668.88
17	PL	Palnadu	Narasaraopet	2,042,000	7,298	279.80
18	PM	Parvathipuram Manyam	Parvathipuram	925,300	3,659	252.88
19	PR	Prakasam	Ongole	2,288,000	14,322	160
20	SR	Srikakulam	Srikakulam	2,191,471	4,591	477.34
21	SS	Sri Sathya Sai	Puttaparthi	1,840,000	8,925	206.2
22	TR	Tirupati	Tirupati	2,197,000	8,231	241.72
23	VS	Visakhapatnam	Visakhapatnam	1,959,500	1,048	1869.8
24	VZ	Vizianagaram	Vizianagaram	1,930,800	4,122	468.41
25	WG	West Godavari	Bhimavaram	1,780,000	2,178	817.3
26	CU	YSR Kadapa	Kadapa	2,060,700	11,228	183.532
27	–	Polavaram	Rampachodavaram	954,000	12,253	77.86
28	–	Markapuram	Markapuram	1,142,313	10,035	113.83

=== Arunachal Pradesh (AR) ===
#	Code	District	Headquarters	Population (2011)	Area (km^{2})	Density (/km^{2})
1	AJ	Anjaw	Hawai	21,089	6,190	3
2	CH	Changlang	Changlang	147,951	4,662	32
3	EK	East Kameng	Seppa	78,413	4,134	19
4	ES	East Siang	Pasighat	99,019	3,603	27
5	– (Note: Kamle district was created in 2017 after bifurcation from Lower Subansiri district.)	Kamle	Raga	22,256	200	111
6	– (Note: Kra Daadi district was created in 2015 after bifurcation from Kurung Kumey district.)	Kra Daadi	Palin	22,290	2202	10
7	KK	Kurung Kumey	Koloriang	89,717	6,040	15
8	– (Note: Lepa Rada district was created in 2018 after bifurcation from Lower Siang district.)	Lepa Rada	Basar	–	–	–
9	EL	Lohit	Tezu	145,538	2,402	61
10	LD	Longding	Longding	60,000	1,200	50
11	DV	Lower Dibang Valley	Roing	53,986	3,900	14
12	– (Note: Lower Siang district was created in 2017 after bifurcation from West Siang & East Siang district.)	Lower Siang	Likabali	22,630	–	–
13	LB	Lower Subansiri	Ziro	82,839	3,508	24
14	– (Note: Namsai district was created in 2014.)	Namsai	Namsai	95,950	1,587	60
15	– (Note: Pakke-Kessang district was created in 2018 after bifurcation from East Kameng district.)	Pakke-Kessang	Lemmi	15,358	1,932	7.9
16	PA	Papum Pare	Yupia	176,385	2,875	61
17	– (Note: Shi Yomi district was created in 2018 after bifurcation from West Siang district.)	Shi Yomi	Tato	13,310	2,875	5
18	– (Note: Siang district was created in 2015.)	Siang	Boleng	31,920	2,919	11
19	TA	Tawang	Tawang	49,950	2,085	24
20	TI	Tirap	Khonsa	111,997	2,362	47
21	UD	Upper Dibang Valley	Anini	8,004	9,129	1
22	US	Upper Siang	Yingkiong	35,289	6,188	6
23	UB	Upper Subansiri	Daporijo	83,205	7,032	12
24	WK	West Kameng	Bomdila	87,013	7,422	12
25	WS	West Siang	Aalo	112,272	8,325	13
26	–	Keyi Panyor	Yachuli	30,000	–	–
27	–	Bichom	Napangphung	9,710	2,897	3.35

=== Assam (AS) ===
#	Code	District	Headquarters	Population (2011)	Area (km^{2})	Density (/km^{2})
1	BK	Baksa	Mushalpur	953,773	2,008	475
2	BJ	Bajali	Pathsala	253,816	418	610
3	BP	Barpeta	Barpeta	1,693,622	3,245	520
4	BN	Biswanath	Biswanath Chariali	612,491	1415	430
5	BO	Bongaigaon	Bongaigaon	732,639	1,724	425
6	CA	Cachar	Silchar	1,736,319	3,786	459
7	CD (Note: Charaideo district was created in 2015 after bifurcation from Sivasagar district.)	Charaideo	Sonari	471,418	1,069	440
8	CH	Chirang	Kajalgaon	481,818	1,975	244
9	DR	Darrang	Mangaldoi	908,090	1,849	491
10	DM	Dhemaji	Dhemaji	688,077	3,237	213
11	DU	Dhubri	Dhubri	1,948,632	2,838	687
12	DI	Dibrugarh	Dibrugarh	1,327,748	3,381	393
13	NC	Dima Hasao	Haflong	213,529	4,888	44
14	GP	Goalpara	Goalpara	1,008,959	1,824	553
15	GG	Golaghat	Golaghat	1,058,674	3,502	302
16	HA	Hailakandi	Hailakandi	659,260	1,327	497
17	HJ	Hojai	Sankardev Nagar	931,218	1686	550
18	JO	Jorhat	Jorhat	1,091,295	2,851	383
19	KU	Kamrup	Amingaon	1,517,202	3,480	436
20	KM	Kamrup Metropolitan	Guwahati	1,260,419	627	2,010
21	KG	Karbi Anglong	Diphu	965,280	10,434	93
22	KR	Karimganj	Karimganj	1,217,002	1,809	673
23	KJ	Kokrajhar	Kokrajhar	886,999	3,129	283
24	LA	Lakhimpur	North Lakhimpur	1,040,644	2,277	457
25	MJ (Note: Majuli district was created in 2016 after bifurcation from Jorhat district.)	Majuli	Garamur	167,304	880	300
26	MA	Morigaon	Marigaon	957,853	1,704	562
27	NN	Nagaon	Nagaon	2,826,006	3,831	738
28	NB	Nalbari	Nalbari	769,919	1,009	763
29	ST	Sivasagar	Sibsagar	1,150,253	2,668	431
30	SO	Sonitpur	Tezpur	1,925,975	5,324	362
31	SM (Note: South Salmara district was created in 2015 after bifurcation from Dhubri district.)	South Salmara-Mankachar	Hatsingimari	555,114	568	980
32	TP	Tamulpur	Tamulpur	389,150	884	440
33	TI	Tinsukia	Tinsukia	1,316,948	3,790	347
34	UD	Udalguri	Udalguri	832,769	1,676	497
35	WK (Note: West Karbi Anglong district was created in 2015 after bifurcation from Karbi Anglong district.)	West Karbi Anglong	Hamren	300,320	3,035	99

=== Bihar (BR) ===
#	Code	District	Headquarters	Population (2011)	Area (km^{2})	Density (/km^{2})
1	AR	Araria	Araria	2,806,200	2,829	992
2	AW	Arwal	Arwal	700,843	638	1,098
3	AU	Aurangabad	Aurangabad	2,511,243	3,303	760
4	BA	Banka	Banka	2,029,339	3,018	672
5	BE	Begusarai	Begusarai	2,954,367	1,917	1,540
6	BG	Bhagalpur	Bhagalpur	3,032,226	2,569	1,180
7	BJ	Bhojpur	Arrah	2,720,155	2,473	1,136
8	BU	Buxar	Buxar	1,707,643	1,624	1,003
9	DA	Darbhanga	Darbhanga	3,921,971	2,278	1,721
10	EC	East Champaran	Motihari	5,082,868	3,969	1,281
11	GA	Gaya	Gaya	4,379,383	4,978	880
12	GO	Gopalganj	Gopalganj	2,558,037	2,033	1,258
13	JA	Jamui	Jamui	1,756,078	3,099	567
14	JE	Jehanabad	Jehanabad	1,124,176	1,569	1,206
15	KM	Kaimur	Bhabua	1,626,900	3,363	488
16	KT	Katihar	Katihar	3,068,149	3,056	1,004
17	KH	Khagaria	Khagaria	1,657,599	1,486	1,115
18	KI	Kishanganj	Kishanganj	1,690,948	1,884	898
19	LA	Lakhisarai	Lakhisarai	1,000,717	1,229	815
20	MP	Madhepura	Madhepura	1,994,618	1,787	1,116
21	MB	Madhubani	Madhubani	4,476,044	3,501	1,279
22	MG	Munger	Munger	1,359,054	1,419	958
23	MZ	Muzaffarpur	Muzaffarpur	4,778,610	3,173	1,506
24	NL	Nalanda	Bihar Sharif	2,872,523	2,354	1,220
25	NW	Nawada	Nawada	2,216,653	2,492	889
26	PA	Patna	Patna	5,772,804	3,202	1,803
27	PU	Purnia	Purnia	3,273,127	3,228	1,014
28	RO	Rohtas	Sasaram	2,962,593	3,850	763
29	SH	Saharsa	Saharsa	1,897,102	1,702	1,125
30	SM	Samastipur	Samastipur	4,254,782	2,905	1,465
31	SR	Saran	Chhapra	3,943,098	2,641	1,493
32	SP	Sheikhpura	Sheikhpura	634,927	689	922
33	SO	Sheohar	Sheohar	656,916	443	1,882
34	ST	Sitamarhi	Sitamarhi	3,419,622	2,199	1,491
35	SW	Siwan	Siwan	3,318,176	2,219	1,495
36	SU	Supaul	Supaul	2,228,397	2,410	919
37	VA	Vaishali	Hajipur	3,495,021	2,036	1,717
38	WC	West Champaran	Bettiah	3,935,042	5,229	753

=== Chhattisgarh (CG) ===
#	Code	District	Headquarters	Population (2011)	Area (km^{2})	Density (/km^{2})
1	– (Note: Balod district was created in 2012 after trifurcation of Durg district.)	Balod	Balod	826,165	3,527	234
2	– (Note: Baloda Bazar district was created in 2012 after trifurcation of Raipur district.)	Baloda Bazar	Baloda Bazar	1,305,343	4,748	275
3	– (Note: Balrampur district was created in 2012 after trifurcation of Surguja district.)	Balrampur-Ramanujganj	Balrampur	730,491	3,806	190
4	BA	Bastar	Jagdalpur	834,873	4,030	210
5	– (Note: Bemetara district was created in 2012 after the trifurcation of Durg district.)	Bemetara	Bemetara	795,759	2,855	270
6	BJ	Bijapur	Bijapur	229,832	6,562	35
7	BI	Bilaspur	Bilaspur	1,961,922	3,508	460
8	DA	Dantewada	Dantewada	533,638	3,411	59
9	DH	Dhamtari	Dhamtari	799,199	2,029	394
10	DU	Durg	Durg	1,721,726	2,238	770
11	– (Note: Gariaband district was created in 2012 after trifurcation of Raipur district.)	Gariaband	Gariaband	597,653	5,823	103
12	– (Note: Gaurella-Pendra-Marwahi district was created in 2020 after bifurcation of Bilaspur district.)	Gaurela-Pendra-Marwahi	Gaurela	336,420	2,307	150
13	JC	Janjgir-Champa	Janjgir	1,620,632	3,848	421
14	JA	Jashpur	Jashpur Nagar	852,043	5,825	146
15	KW	Kabirdham	Kawardha	584,667	4,237	195
16	KK	Kanker	Kanker	748,593	6,513	115
17	– (Note: Khairagarh-Chhuikhadan-Gandai district was announced on 16 April 2022.)	Khairagarh-Chhuikhadan-Gandai	Khairagarh	368,444	1,554	237
18	– (Note: Kondagaon district was created in 2012 after bifurcation of Bastar district.)	Kondagaon	Kondagaon	578,326	7,768	74
19	KB	Korba	Korba	1,206,563	6,615	183
20	KJ	Korea	Baikunthpur	659,039	6,578	100
21	MA	Mahasamund	Mahasamund	1,032,275	4,779	216
22	MG (Note: Manendragarh-Chirmiri-Bharatpur, Mohla-Manpur-Ambagarh Chowki, Shakti, and Sarangarh-Bilaigarh districts were announced on 15 August 2021.)	Manendragarh-Chirmiri-Bharatpur	Manendragarh	381,287	4,227	90
23	MM	Mohla-Manpur-Ambagarh Chowki	Mohla	283,947	2,145	132
24	– (Note: Mungeli district was created in 2012 after bifurcation of Bilaspur district.)	Mungeli	Mungeli	701,707	2,750	255
25	NR	Narayanpur	Narayanpur	140,206	6,640	20
26	RG	Raigarh	Raigarh	1,493,627	7,068	211
27	RP	Raipur	Raipur	2,160,876	2,892	750
28	RN	Rajnandgaon	Rajnandgaon	1,537,520	8,062	191
29	SB	Sarangarh-Bilaigarh	Sarangarh	607,434	1,650	368
30	ST	Sakti	Sakti	653,036	1,601	408
31	SK (Note: Sukma district was created in 2012 after bifurcation of Dantewada district.)	Sukma	Sukma	250,159	5,897	42
32	– (Note: Surajpur district was created in 2012 after trifurcation of Surguja district.)	Surajpur	Surajpur	789,043	2,787	280
33	SJ	Surguja	Ambikapur	839,661	3,265	150

=== Goa (GA) ===
#	Code	District	Headquarters	Population (2011)	Area (km^{2})	Density (/km^{2})
1	NG	North Goa	Panaji	817,761	1,736	471
2	SG	South Goa	Margao	639,962	1,966	326
3	–	Kushavati	Quepem	220,000	1,962	112

=== Gujarat (GJ) ===
#	Code	District	Headquarters	Population (2011)	Area (km^{2})	Density (/km^{2})
1	AH	Ahmedabad	Ahmedabad	7,208,200	7170	890
2	AM	Amreli	Amreli	1,513,614	6,760	205
3	AN	Anand	Anand	2,090,276	2,942	711
4	AR	Aravalli	Modasa	1,051,746	3,217	327
5	BK	Banaskantha	Palanpur	3,116,045	6,176	290
6	BR	Bharuch	Bharuch	1,550,822	6,524	238
7	BV	Bhavnagar	Bhavnagar	2,877,961	11,155	288
8	BT	Botad	Botad	656,005	2,564	256
9	CU	Chhota Udaipur	Chhota Udaipur	1,071,831	3,237	331
10	DA	Dahod	Dahod	2,126,558	3,642	582
11	DG	Dang	Ahwa	226,769	1,764	129
12	DD	Devbhumi Dwarka	Khambhalia	752,484	5,684	132
13	GA	Gandhinagar	Gandhinagar	1,387,478	2163	660
14	GS	Gir Somnath	Veraval	1,217,477	3,754	324
15	JA	Jamnagar	Jamnagar	2,159,130	14,125	153
16	JU	Junagadh	Junagadh	2,742,291	8,839	310
17	KH	Kheda	Nadiad	2,298,934	3,667	541
18	KA	Kutch	Bhuj	2,090,313	45,652	46
19	MH	Mahisagar	Lunavada	994,624	2,500	440
20	MA	Mehsana	Mehsana	2,027,727	4,386	462
21	MB	Morbi	Morbi	960,329	4,871	197
22	NR	Narmada	Rajpipla	590,379	2,749	214
23	NV	Navsari	Navsari	1,330,711	2,211	602
24	PM	Panchmahal	Godhra	2,388,267	5,219	458
25	PA	Patan	Patan	1,342,746	5,738	234
26	PO	Porbandar	Porbandar	586,062	2,294	255
27	RA	Rajkot	Rajkot	3,157,676	11,203	282
28	SK	Sabarkantha	Himatnagar	2,427,346	7,390	328
29	ST	Surat	Surat	6,081,322	4,418	953
30	SN	Surendranagar	Surendranagar	1,755,873	10,489	167
31	TA	Tapi	Vyara	806,489	3,435	249
32	VD	Vadodara	Vadodara	3,639,775	4312	467
33	VL	Valsad	Valsad	1,703,068	3,034	561
34	–	Vav-Tharad	Tharad	1,380,870	6,527	220

=== Haryana (HR) ===
#	Code	District	Headquarters	Population (2011)	Area (km^{2})	Density (/km^{2})
1	AM	Ambala	Ambala	1,136,784	1,569	722
2	BH	Bhiwani	Bhiwani	1,629,109	5,140	341
3	CD	Charkhi Dadri	Charkhi Dadri	502,276	1370	367
4	HR	Faridabad	Faridabad	1,798,954	783	2,298
5	FT	Fatehabad	Fatehabad	941,522	2,538	371
6	GU	Gurugram	Gurugram	1,514,085	1,258	1,241
7	HI	Hisar	Hisar	1,742,815	3,788	438
8	JH	Jhajjar	Jhajjar	956,907	1,868	522
9	JI	Jind	Jind	1,332,042	2,702	493
10	KT	Kaithal	Kaithal	1,072,861	2,317	467
11	KR	Karnal	Karnal	1,506,323	2,471	598
12	KU	Kurukshetra	Kurukshetra	964,231	1,530	630
13	MA	Mahendragarh	Narnaul	921,680	1,900	485
14	MW	Nuh	Nuh	1,089,406	1,765	729
15	PW	Palwal	Palwal	1,040,493	1,367	761
16	PK	Panchkula	Panchkula	558,890	816	622
17	PP	Panipat	Panipat	1,202,811	1,250	949
18	RE	Rewari	Rewari	896,129	1,559	562
19	RO	Rohtak	Rohtak	1,058,683	1,668	607
20	SI	Sirsa	Sirsa	1,295,114	4,276	303
21	SNP	Sonipat	Sonipat	1,480,080	2,260	697
22	YN	Yamunanagar	Yamunanagar	1,214,162	1,756	687
23	–	Hansi	Hansi	540,994	1,350	401

=== Himachal Pradesh (HP) ===
#	Code	District	Headquarters	Population (2011)	Area (km^{2})	Density (/km^{2})
1	BI	Bilaspur	Bilaspur	382,056	1,167	327
2	CH	Chamba	Chamba	518,844	6,528	80
3	HA	Hamirpur	Hamirpur	454,293	1,118	406
4	KA	Kangra	Dharamshala	1,507,223	5,739	263
5	KI	Kinnaur	Reckong Peo	84,298	6,401	13
6	KU	Kullu	Kullu	437,474	5,503	79
7	LH	Lahaul and Spiti	Keylong	18,528	7,835	2.3
8	MA	Mandi	Mandi	999,518	3,950	253
9	SH	Shimla	Shimla	813,384	5,131	159
10	SI	Sirmaur	Nahan	530,164	2,825	188
11	SO	Solan	Solan	576,670	1,936	298
12	UN	Una	Una	521,057	1,540	328

=== Jharkhand (JH) ===
#	Code	District	Headquarters	Population (2011)	Area (km^{2})	Density (/km^{2})
1	BO	Bokaro	Bokaro	2,061,918	2,883	716
2	CH	Chatra	Chatra	1,042,304	3,700	275
3	DE	Deoghar	Deoghar	1,491,879	2,479	602
4	DH	Dhanbad	Dhanbad	2,682,662	2,040	1,316
5	DU	Dumka	Dumka	1,321,096	4,404	300
6	ES	East Singhbhum	Jamshedpur	2,291,032	3,562	648
7	GA	Garhwa	Garhwa	1,322,387	4,064	327
8	GI	Giridih	Giridih	2,445,203	4,887	497
9	GO	Godda	Godda	1,311,382	2,110	622
10	GU	Gumla	Gumla	1,025,656	5,360	191
11	HA	Hazaribag	Hazaribag	1,734,495	3,555	488
12	JA	Jamtara	Jamtara	790,207	1,802	439
13	KH	Khunti	Khunti	530,299	2,535	210
14	KO	Koderma	Koderma	716,259	2,540	282
15	LA	Latehar	Latehar	725,673	3,630	200
16	LO	Lohardaga	Lohardaga	461,738	1,502	307
17	PK	Pakur	Pakur	899,200	1,805	498
18	PL	Palamu	Daltonganj	1,936,319	4,393	442
19	RM	Ramgarh	Ramgarh	949,159	1,341	708
20	RA	Ranchi	Ranchi	2,912,022	5,097	572
21	SA	Sahibganj	Sahebganj	1,150,038	2,063	558
22	SK	Seraikela-Kharsawan	Seraikela	1,063,458	2,657	401
23	SI	Simdega	Simdega	599,813	3,750	160
24	WS	West Singhbhum	Chaibasa	1,501,619	7,224	209

=== Karnataka (KA) ===
#	Code	District	Headquarters	Population (2011)	Area (km^{2})	Density (/km^{2})
1	BK	Bagalkot	Bagalkote	1,890,826	6,583	288
2	BL	Ballari	Ballari	1,400,970	4,252	330
3	BG	Belagavi	Belgaum	4,778,439	13,415	356
4	BR	Bangalore Rural	Bangalore	987,257	2,239	441
5	BN	Bangalore Urban	Bangalore	9,588,910	2,190	4,378
6	BD	Bidar	Bidar	1,700,018	5,448	312
7	CJ	Chamarajanagar	Chamarajanagar	1,020,962	5,102	200
8	CK	Chikkaballapur	Chikkaballapur	1,254,377	4,208	298
9	CK	Chikmagalur	Chikmagalur	1,137,753	7,201	158
10	CT	Chitradurga	Chitradurga	1,660,378	8,437	197
11	DK	Dakshina Kannada	Mangalore	2,083,625	4,559	457
12	DA	Davanagere	Davangere	1,643,494	4,460	370
13	DH	Dharwad	Dharwad	1,846,993	4,265	434
14	GA	Gadaga	Gadag-Betageri	1,065,235	4,651	229
15	GU	Kalaburagi	Kalaburagi	2,564,892	10,990	233
16	HS	Hassan	Hassan	1,776,221	6,814	261
17	HV	Haveri	Haveri	1,598,506	4,825	331
18	KD	Kodagu	Madikeri	554,762	4,102	135
19	KL	Kolar	Kolar	1,540,231	4,012	384
20	KP	Koppal	Koppal	1,391,292	5,565	250
21	MA	Mandya	Mandya	1,808,680	4,961	365
22	MY	Mysore	Mysore	2,994,744	6,854	437
23	RA	Raichur	Raichur	1,924,773	6,839	228
24	BS	Bengaluru South	Bengaluru South	1,082,739	3,573	303
25	SH	Shimoga	Shimoga	1,755,512	8,495	207
26	TU	Tumakuru	Tumakuru	2,681,449	10,598	253
27	UD	Udupi	Udupi	1,177,908	3,879	304
28	UK	Uttara Kannada	Karwar	1,353,299	10,291	132
29	–	Vijayanagara	Hospete	1,353,628	5,644	240
30	BJ	Bijapur	Bijapur	2,175,102	10,517	207
31	YG	Yadgir	Yadgir	1,172,985	5,225	224

=== Kerala (KL) ===
#	Code	District	Headquarters	Population (2011)	Area (km^{2})	Density (/km^{2})
1	AL	Alappuzha	Alappuzha	2,121,943	1,415	1,501
2	ER	Ernakulam	Kakkanad	3,279,860	3,063	1,069
3	ID	Idukki	Painavu	1,107,453	4,356	254
4	KN	Kannur	Kannur	2,525,637	2,961	852
5	KS	Kasaragod	Kasaragod	1,302,600	1,989	654
6	KL	Kollam	Kollam	2,629,703	2,483	1,056
7	KT	Kottayam	Kottayam	1,979,384	2,206	896
8	KZ	Kozhikode	Kozhikode	3,089,543	2,345	1,318
9	MA	Malappuram	Malappuram	4,110,956	3,554	1,058
10	PL	Palakkad	Palakkad	2,810,892	4,482	627
11	PT	Pathanamthitta	Pathanamthitta	1,195,537	2,652	453
13	TV	Thiruvananthapuram	Thiruvananthapuram	3,307,284	2,189	1,509
12	TS	Thrissur	Thrissur	3,110,327	3,027	1,026
14	WA	Wayanad	Kalpetta	816,558	2,130	383

=== Madhya Pradesh (MP) ===
#	Code	District	Headquarters	Population (2011)	Area (km^{2})	Density (/km^{2})
1	AG	Agar Malwa	Agar	571,275	2,785	205
2	AL	Alirajpur	Alirajpur	728,677	3,182	229
3	AP	Anuppur	Anuppur	749,521	3,747	200
4	AS	Ashoknagar	Ashoknagar	844,979	4,674	181
5	BL	Balaghat	Balaghat	1,701,156	9,229	184
6	BR	Barwani	Barwani	1,385,659	5,432	256
7	BE	Betul	Betul	1,575,247	10,043	157
8	BD	Bhind	Bhind	1,703,562	4,459	382
9	BP	Bhopal	Bhopal	2,368,145	2,772	854
10	BU	Burhanpur	Burhanpur	756,993	3,427	221
11	CT	Chhatarpur	Chhatarpur	1,762,857	8,687	203
12	CN	Chhindwara	Chhindwara	2,090,306	11,815	177
13	DM	Damoh	Damoh	1,263,703	7,306	173
14	DT	Datia	Datia	786,375	2,694	292
15	DE	Dewas	Dewas	1,563,107	7,020	223
16	DH	Dhar	Dhar	2,184,672	8,153	268
17	DI	Dindori	Dindori	704,218	7,427	94
18	GU	Guna	Guna	1,240,938	6,485	194
19	GW	Gwalior	Gwalior	2,030,543	5,465	445
20	HA	Harda	Harda	570,302	3,339	171
21	NA	Hoshangabad	Hoshangabad	1,240,975	6,698	185
22	IN	Indore	Indore	3,272,335	3,898	839
23	JA	Jabalpur	Jabalpur	2,460,714	5,210	472
24	JH	Jhabua	Jhabua	1,024,091	6,782	285
25	KA	Katni	Katni	1,291,684	4,947	261
26	EN	Khandwa	Khandwa	1,309,443	7,349	178
27	WN	Khargone	Khargone	1,872,413	8,010	233
28	MH	Maihar	Maihar	856,028	2,723	314
29	ML	Mandla	Mandla	1,053,522	5,805	182
30	MS	Mandsaur	Mandsaur	1,339,832	5,530	242
31	MG	Mauganj	Mauganj	616,645	1,867	330
32	MO	Morena	Morena	1,965,137	4,991	394
33	NA	Narsinghpur	Narsinghpur	1,092,141	5,133	213
34	NE	Neemuch	Neemuch	825,958	4,267	194
35	–	Niwari	Niwari	404,807	1,170	345
36	PA	Panna	Panna	1,016,028	7,135	142
37	PD	Pandhurna	Pandhurna	374,310	1,522	246
38	RS	Raisen	Raisen	1,331,699	8,466	157
39	RG	Rajgarh	Rajgarh	1,546,541	6,143	251
40	RL	Ratlam	Ratlam	1,454,483	4,861	299
41	RE	Rewa	Rewa	2,363,744	6,314	374
42	SG	Sagar	Sagar	2,378,295	10,252	272
43	ST	Satna	Satna	2,228,619	7,502	297
44	SR	Sehore	Sehore	1,311,008	6,578	199
45	SO	Seoni	Seoni	1,378,876	8,758	157
46	SH	Shahdol	Shahdol	1,064,989	6,205	172
47	SJ	Shajapur	Shajapur	1,512,353	6,196	244
48	SP	Sheopur	Sheopur	687,952	6,585	104
49	SV	Shivpuri	Shivpuri	1,725,818	10,290	168
50	SI	Sidhi	Sidhi	1,126,515	10,520	232
51	SN	Singrauli	Waidhan	1,178,132	5,672	208
52	TI	Tikamgarh	Tikamgarh	1,444,920	5,055	286
53	UJ	Ujjain	Ujjain	1,986,864	6,091	356
54	UM	Umaria	Umaria	643,579	4,062	158
55	VI	Vidisha	Vidisha	1,458,212	7,362	198

=== Maharashtra (MH) ===
#	Code	District	Headquarters	Population (2011)	Area (km^{2})	Density (/km^{2})
1	AH	Ahmednagar	Ahmednagar	4,543,083	17,048	266
2	AK	Akola	Akola	1,818,617	5,429	321
3	AM	Amravati	Amravati	2,887,826	12,235	237
4	AU	Aurangabad	Aurangabad	3,695,928	10,107	365
5	BI	Beed	Beed	2,585,962	10,693	242
6	BH	Bhandara	Bhandara	1,198,810	3,890	293
7	BU	Buldhana	Buldhana	2,588,039	9,661	268
8	CH	Chandrapur	Chandrapur	2,194,262	11,443	192
9	OS	Osmanabad	Osmanabad	1,660,311	7,569	219
10	DH	Dhule	Dhule	2,048,781	8,095	285
11	GA	Gadchiroli	Gadchiroli	1,071,795	14,412	74
12	GO	Gondia	Gondia	1,322,331	5,431	253
13	HI	Hingoli	Hingoli	1,178,973	4,526	244
14	JG	Jalgaon	Jalgaon	4,229,917	11,765	360
15	JN	Jalna	Jalna	1,958,483	7,718	255
16	KO	Kolhapur	Kolhapur	3,874,015	7,685	504
17	LA	Latur	Latur	2,455,543	7,157	343
18	MC	Mumbai City	Mumbai	3,145,966	157	20,036
19	MU	Mumbai Suburban	Bandra (East)	9,332,481	446	21,000
20	ND	Nanded	Nanded	3,356,566	10,528	319
21	NB	Nandurbar	Nandurbar	1,646,177	5,055	276
22	NG	Nagpur	Nagpur	4,653,171	9,892	470
23	NS	Nashik	Nashik	6,109,052	15,539	393
24	PL	Palghar	Palghar	2,990,116	5,344	560
25	PA	Parbhani	Parbhani	1,835,982	6,511	295
26	PU	Pune	Pune	9,426,959	15,643	603
27	RG	Raigad	Alibag	2,635,394	7,152	368
28	RT	Ratnagiri	Ratnagiri	1,612,672	8,208	196
29	SN	Sangli	Sangli	2,820,575	8,572	329
30	ST	Satara	Satara	3,003,922	10,475	287
31	SI	Sindhudurg	Oros	848,868	5,207	163
32	SO	Solapur	Solapur	4,315,527	14,895	290
33	TH	Thane	Thane	8,070,032	4,214	1,915
34	WR	Wardha	Wardha	1,296,157	6,309	205
35	WS	Washim	Washim	1,196,714	5,155	244
36	YA	Yavatmal	Yavatmal	2,775,457	13,582	204

=== Manipur (MN) ===
#	Code	District	Headquarters	Population (2011)	Area (km^{2})	Density (/km^{2})
1	BPR	Bishnupur	Bishnupur	240,363	496	415
2	CDL	Chandel	Chandel	144,028	2,100	37
3	CCpr	Churachandpur	Churachandpur	271,274	2,392	50
4	IE	Imphal East	Porompat	452,661	497	555
5	IW	Imphal West	Lamphelpat	514,683	519	847
6	JBM	Jiribam	Jiribam	43,818	182	190
7	KAK	Kakching	Kakching	135,481	190	710
8	KJ	Kamjong	Kamjong	45,616	2,338	23
9	KPI	Kangpokpi	Kangpokpi	193,744	1,698	110
10	NL	Noney	Noney (Longmai)	–	1,076	–
11	PZ	Pherzawl	Pherzawl	47,250	2,128	21
12	SE	Senapati	Senapati	354,772	1,573	116
13	TML	Tamenglong	Tamenglong	140,143	3,315	25
14	TNL	Tengnoupal	Tengnoupal	59,110	1,213	49
15	TBL	Thoubal	Thoubal	420,517	324	713
16	UKR	Ukhrul	Ukhrul	183,115	2,206	31

=== Meghalaya (ML) ===
#	Code	District	Headquarters	Population (2011)	Area (km^{2})	Density (/km^{2})
1	EG	East Garo Hills	Williamnagar	317,618	2,603	121
2	–	East Jaintia Hills	Khliehriat	122,436	2,115	58
3	EK	East Khasi Hills	Shillong	824,059	2,752	292
4	–	Eastern West Khasi Hills	Mairang	131,451	1,356	97
5	–	North Garo Hills	Resubelpara	118,325	1,113	106
6	RB	Ri Bhoi	Nongpoh	258,380	2,378	109
7	SG	South Garo Hills	Baghmara	142,574	1,850	77
8	–	South West Garo Hills	Ampati	172,495	822	210
9	–	South West Khasi Hills	Mawkyrwat	110,152	1,341	82
10	WG	West Garo Hills	Tura	642,923	3,714	173
11	WJ	West Jaintia Hills	Jowai	270,352	1,693	160
12	WK	West Khasi Hills	Nongstoin	385,601	5,247	73

=== Mizoram (MZ) ===
#	Code	District	Headquarters	Population (2011)	Area (km^{2})	Density (/km^{2})
1	AI	Aizawl	Aizawl	404,054	3,577	113
2	CH	Champhai	Champhai	125,370	3,168	39
3	-	Hnahthial	Hnahthial	28,468	1,030	28
4	-	Khawzawl	Khawzawl	41,974	1,189	35
5	KO	Kolasib	Kolasib	83,054	1,386	60
6	LA	Lawngtlai	Lawngtlai	117,444	2,519	46
7	LU	Lunglei	Lunglei	154,094	4,572	34
8	MA	Mamit	Mamit	85,757	2,967	28
9	SA	Saiha	Saiha	56,366	1,414	40
10	-	Saitual	Saitual	50,575	1,757	29
11	SE	Serchhip	Serchhip	64,875	1,424	46

=== Nagaland (NL) ===
#	Code	District	Headquarters	Population (2011)	Area (km^{2})	Density (/km^{2})
1	–	Chümoukedima	Chümoukedima	125,400	570	220
2	DI	Dimapur	Dimapur	379,769	926	410
3	KI	Kiphire	Kiphire	74,033	1,255	66
4	KO	Kohima	Kohima	270,063	1,041	213
5	LO	Longleng	Longleng	50,593	885	89
6	MK	Mokokchung	Mokokchung	193,171	1,615	120
7	MN	Mon	Mon	259,604	1,786	145
8	–	Niuland	Niuland	42,287	483.63	87
9	–	Noklak	Noklak	59,300	1,152	51
10	PE	Peren	Peren	163,294	2,300	55
11	PH	Phek	Phek	163,294	2,026	81
12	–	Shamator	Shamator	34,223	469	73
13	–	Tseminyü	Tseminyü	63,629	256	249
14	TU	Tuensang	Tuensang	414,801	4,228	98
15	WO	Wokha	Wokha	166,239	1,628	120
16	ZU	Zunheboto	Zunheboto	141,014	1,255	112

=== Odisha (OD) ===
#	Code	District	Headquarters	Population (2011)	Area (km^{2})	Density (/km^{2})
1	AN	Angul	Angul	1,271,703	6,232	199
2	BD	Boudh	Boudh	439,917	3,098	142
3	BH	Bhadrak	Bhadrak	1,506,522	2,505	601
4	BL	Balangir	Balangir	1,648,574	6,575	251
5	BR	Bargarh	Bargarh	1,478,833	5,837	253
6	BW	Balasore	Balasore	2,317,419	3,634	609
7	CU	Cuttack	Cuttack	2,618,708	3,932	666
8	DE	Debagarh	Debagarh	312,164	2,781	106
9	DH	Dhenkanal	Dhenkanal	1,192,948	4,452	268
10	GN	Ganjam	Chhatrapur	3,529,031	8,206	430
11	GP	Gajapati	Paralakhemundi	575,880	3,850	133
12	JH	Jharsuguda	Jharsuguda	579,499	2,081	274
13	JP	Jajpur	Jajpur	1,826,275	2,888	630
14	JS	Jagatsinghpur	Jagatsinghpur	1,136,604	1,759	681
15	KH	Khordha	Khordha	2,251,673	2,813	800
16	KJ	Kendujhar	Kendujhar	1,802,777	8,240	217
17	KL	Kalahandi	Bhawanipatna	1,573,054	7,920	199
18	KN	Kandhamal	Phulbani	731,952	8,021	91
19	KO	Koraput	Koraput	1,376,934	8,807	156
20	KP	Kendrapara	Kendrapara	1,439,891	2,644	545
21	ML	Malkangiri	Malkangiri	612,727	5,791	106
22	MY	Mayurbhanj	Baripada	2,513,895	10,418	241
23	NB	Nabarangpur	Nabarangpur	1,218,762	5,294	230
24	NU	Nuapada	Nuapada	606,490	3,408	157
25	NY	Nayagarh	Nayagarh	962,215	3,890	247
26	PU	Puri	Puri	1,697,983	3,051	488
27	RA	Rayagada	Rayagada	961,959	7,584.7	136
28	SA	Sambalpur	Sambalpur	1,044,410	6,702	158
29	SO	Subarnapur	Subarnapur	652,107	2,284	279
30	SU	Sundargarh	Sundergarh	2,080,664	9,712	214

=== Punjab (PB) ===
#	Code	District	Headquarters	Population (2011)	Area (km^{2})	Density (/km^{2})
1	AM	Amritsar	Amritsar	2,490,891	2,673	932
2	BNL	Barnala	Barnala	596,294	1,423	419
3	BA	Bathinda	Bathinda	1,388,859	3,355	414
4	FR	Faridkot	Faridkot	618,008	1,472	424
5	FT	Fatehgarh Sahib	Fatehgarh Sahib	599,814	1,180	508
6	FA	Fazilka (Note: Fazilka district was formed in 2011, no data in census 2011 on this district.)	Fazilka	1,180,483	3113	379
7	FI	Firozpur	Firozpur	2,026,831	5,334	380
8	GU	Gurdaspur	Gurdaspur	2,299,026	3,542	649
9	HO	Hoshiarpur	Hoshiarpur	1,582,793	3,397	466
10	JA	Jalandhar	Jalandhar	2,181,753	2,625	831
11	KA	Kapurthala	Kapurthala	817,668	1,646	501
12	LU	Ludhiana	Ludhiana	3,487,882	3,744	975
13	ML	Malerkotla	Malerkotla	429,754	684	629
14	MA	Mansa	Mansa	768,808	2,174	350
15	MO	Moga	Moga	992,289	2,235	444
16	PA	Pathankot	Pathankot	626,154	929	674
17	PA	Patiala	Patiala	2,892,282	3,175	596
18	RU	Rupnagar	Rupnagar	683,349	1,400	488
19	SAS	Sahibzada Ajit Singh Nagar	Sahibzada Ajit Singh Nagar	986,147	1,188	830
20	SA	Sangrur	Sangrur	1,654,408	3,685	449
21	PB	Shahid Bhagat Singh Nagar	Nawanshahr	614,362	1,283	479
22	MU	Sri Muktsar Sahib	Sri Muktsar Sahib	902,702	2,596	348
23	TT	Tarn Taran	Tarn Taran Sahib	1,120,070	2,414	464

=== Rajasthan (RJ) ===
#	Code	District	Headquarters	Population (2011)	Area (km^{2})	Density (/km^{2})
1	AJ	Ajmer	Ajmer	2,584,913	8,481	305
2	AL	Alwar	Alwar	3,671,999	8,380	438
3	BA	Balotra	Balotra	970,760	19,000	51
4	BN	Banswara	Banswara	1,798,194	5,037	399
5	BR	Baran	Baran	1,223,921	6,955	175
6	BM	Barmer	Barmer	2,604,453	28,387	92
7	BE	Beawar	Beawar	–	–	–
8	BP	Bharatpur	Bharatpur	2,549,121	5,066	503
9	BW	Bhilwara	Bhilwara	2,410,459	10,455	230
10	BI	Bikaner	Bikaner	2,367,745	27,244	78
11	BU	Bundi	Bundi	1,113,725	5,550	193
12	CT	Chittorgarh	Chittorgarh	1,544,392	10,856	193
13	CR	Churu	Churu	2,041,172	16,830	148
14	DA	Dausa	Dausa	1,637,226	3,429	476
15	-	Deeg	Deeg	1,072,755	2,169	495
16	DH	Dholpur	Dholpur	1,207,293	3,084	398
17	DK	Didwana Kuchaman	Didwana	1,625,837	6,803	239
18	DU	Dungarpur	Dungarpur	1,388,906	3,771	368
19	HA	Hanumangarh	Hanumangarh	1,779,650	9,670	184
20	JP	Jaipur	Jaipur	6,626,178	11,143	595
21	JS	Jaisalmer	Jaisalmer	672,008	38,401	17
22	JL	Jalore	Jalore	1,830,151	10,640	172
23	JW	Jhalawar	Jhalawar	1,411,327	6,219	227
24	JJ	Jhunjhunu	Jhunjhunu	2,139,658	5,928	361
25	JO	Jodhpur	Jodhpur	3,685,681	22,850	161
26	KA	Karauli	Karauli	1,458,459	5,530	264
27	KT	Khairthal-Tijara	Khairthal	966,821	2,007	482
28	KO	Kota	Kota	1,950,491	5,446	374
29	KP	Kotputli-Behror	Kotputli	NA	NA	NA
30	NA	Nagaur	Nagaur	3,309,234	17,718	187
31	PA	Pali	Pali	2,038,533	12,387	165
32	PH	Phalodi	Phalodi	NA	NA	NA
33	PG	Pratapgarh	Pratapgarh	867,848	4,112	211
34	RA	Rajsamand	Rajsamand	1,158,283	3,853	302
35	-	Salumbar	Salumbar	570,775	NA	NA
36	SM	Sawai Madhopur	Sawai Madhopur	1,338,114	4,500	257
37	SK	Sikar	Sikar	2,677,737	7,732	346
38	SR	Sirohi	Sirohi	1,037,185	5,136	202
39	GA	Sri Ganganagar	Sri Ganganagar	1,969,520	10,990	179
40	TO	Tonk	Tonk	1,421,711	7,194	198
41	UD	Udaipur	Udaipur	3,067,549	13,430	242

=== Sikkim (SK) ===
#	Code	District	Headquarters	Population (2011)	Area (km^{2})	Density (/km^{2})
1	ES	Gangtok	Gangtok	281,293	954	295
2	WS	Gyalshing	Gyalshing	136,299	1,166	117
3	NS	Mangan	Mangan	43,354	4,226	10
4	SS	Namchi	Namchi	146,742	750	196
5	PS	Pakyong	Pakyong	74,583	404	180
6		Soreng	Soreng	64,760	293	221

=== Tamil Nadu (TN) ===
#	Code	District	Headquarters	Population (2011)	Area (km^{2})	Density (/km^{2})
1	AY	Ariyalur	Ariyalur	752,481	3,208	387
2	CGL	Chengalpattu	Chengalpattu	2,556,244	2,945	868
3	CH	Chennai	Chennai	7,139,882	426	17,000
4	CO	Coimbatore	Coimbatore	3,472,578	4,723	748
5	CU	Cuddalore	Cuddalore	2,600,880	3,999	702
6	DH	Dharmapuri	Dharmapuri	1,502,900	4,532	332
7	DGL	Dindigul	Dindigul	2,161,367	6,058	357
8	ER	Erode	Erode	2,259,608	5,714	397
9	KL	Kallakurichi	Kallakurichi	1,682,687	3,520	478
10	KC	Kanchipuram	Kanchipuram	1,166,401	1,656	704
11	KK	Kanyakumari	Nagercoil	1,863,178	1,685	1,106
12	KA	Karur	Karur	1,076,588	2,901	371
13	KR	Krishnagiri	Krishnagiri	1,883,731	5,086	370
14	MDU	Madurai	Madurai	3,191,038	3,676	823
15	MLD	Mayiladuthurai	Mayiladuthurai	918,356	1,172	784
16	NG	Nagapattinam	Nagapattinam	1,614,069	2,716	668
17	NI	Nilgiris	Ooty	735,071	2,549	288
18	NM	Namakkal	Namakkal	1,721,179	3,429	506
19	PE	Perambalur	Perambalur	564,511	1,752	323
20	PU	Pudukkottai	Pudukkottai	1,918,725	4,651	348
21	RA	Ramanathapuram	Ramanathapuram	1,337,560	4,123	320
22	RN	Ranipet	Ranipettai	1,210,277	2,234	524
23	SA	Salem	Salem	3,480,008	5,245	663
24	SVG	Sivaganga	Sivagangai	1,341,250	4,086	324
25	TS	Tenkasi	Tenkasi	14,07,627	2916	483
26	TP	Tiruppur	Tiruppur	2,471,222	5,106	476
27	TC	Tiruchirappalli	Tiruchirappalli	2,713,858	4,407	602
28	TH	Theni	Theni	1,243,684	3,066	433
29	TI	Tirunelveli	Tirunelveli	1,665,253	3,842	433
30	TJ	Thanjavur	Thanjavur	2,402,781	3,397	691
31	TK	Thoothukudi	Thoothukudi	1,738,376	4,594	378
32	TP	Tirupattur	Tirupattur	1,111,812	1,798	618
33	TL	Tiruvallur	Tiruvallur	3,725,697	3,424	1,049
34	TR	Tiruvarur	Thiruvarur	1,268,094	2,377	533
35	TV	Tiruvannamalai	Tiruvannaamalai	2,468,965	6,191	399
36	VE	Vellore	Vellore	1,614,242	2,080	776
37	VL	Viluppuram	Viluppuram	2,093,003	3,725	562
38	VNR	Virudhunagar	Virudhunagar	1,943,309	3,446	454

=== Telangana (TG) ===
#	Code	District	Headquarters	Population (2011)	Area (km^{2})	Density (/km^{2})
1	AD	Adilabad	Adilabad	708,952	4,185.97	171
2	BK	Bhadradri Kothagudem	Kothagudem	1,304,811	8,951.00	143
3	–	Hanamkonda	Hanamkonda	1,135,707	1,304.50	826
4	HY	Hyderabad	Hyderabad	3,943,323	217	18,172
5	–	Jagtial	Jagtial	983,414	3,043.23	407
6	–	Jangaon	Jangaon	582,457	2,187.50	259
7	–	Jayashankar Bhupalpally	Bhupalpally	712,257	6,361.70	115
8	–	Jogulamba Gadwal	Gadwal	664,971	2,928.00	208
9	–	Kamareddy	Kamareddy	972,625	3,651.00	266
10	KA	Karimnagar	Karimnagar	1,016,063	2,379.07	473
11	KH	Khammam	Khammam	1,401,639	4,453.00	321
12	–	Kumuram Bheem Asifabad	Asifabad	515,835	4,300.16	106
13	–	Mahabubabad	Mahabubabad	770,170	2,876.70	269
14	MA	Mahbubnagar	Mahbubnagar	1,318,110	4,037.00	281
15	–	Mancherial	Mancherial	807,037	4,056.36	201
16	ME	Medak	Medak	767,428	2,740.89	275
17	–	Medchal–Malkajgiri	Shamirpet	2,542,203	5,005.98	2,251
18	–	Mulugu	Mulugu	2,94,671	3,881	124
19	NA	Nalgonda	Nalgonda	1,631,399	2,449.79	227
20	–	Nagarkurnool	Nagarkurnool	893,308	6,545.00	124
21	–	Narayanpet	Narayanpet	5,66,874	2336.44	243
22	–	Nirmal	Nirmal	709,415	3,562.51	185
23	NI	Nizamabad	Nizamabad	1,534,428	4,153.00	366
24	–	Peddapalli	Peddapalli	795,332	4,614.74	356
25	–	Rajanna Sircilla	Sircilla	546,121	2,030.89	273
26	RA	Ranga Reddy	Hyderabad	2,551,731	5,031.00	486
27	–	Sangareddy	Sangareddy	1,527,628	4,464.87	347
28	–	Siddipet	Siddipet	993,376	3,425.19	279
29	–	Suryapet	Suryapet	1,099,560	3,374.47	305
30	–	Vikarabad	Vikarabad	881,250	3,385.00	274
31	–	Wanaparthy	Wanaparthy	751,553	2,938.00	268
32	WL	Warangal	Warangal	716,457	2,175.50	330
33	–	Yadadri Bhuvanagiri	Bhongir	726,465	3,091.48	239

=== Tripura (TR) ===
#	Code	District	Headquarters	Population (2011)	Area (km^{2})	Density (/km^{2})
1	DH	Dhalai	Ambassa	377,988	2,400	157
2	GM	Gomati	Udaipur	436,868	1522.8	287
3	KH	Khowai (Note: Khowai district of Tripura did not exist during census 2011.)	Khowai	327,391	1005.67	326
4	NT	North Tripura	Dharmanagar	415,946	1444.5	288
5	SP	Sepahijala (Note: Sepahijala district of Tripura did not exist during census 2011.)	Bishramganj	484,233	1044.78	463
6	ST	South Tripura	Belonia	433,737	1534.2	283
7	UK	Unakoti (Note: Unakoti district of Tripura did not exist during census 2011.)	Kailashahar	277,335	591.93	469
8	WT	West Tripura	Agartala	917,534	942.55	973

=== Uttar Pradesh (UP) ===
#	Code	District	Headquarters	Population (2011)	Area (km^{2})	Density (/km^{2})
1	AG	Agra	Agra	4,380,793	4,027	1,084
2	AL	Aligarh	Aligarh	3,673,849	3,747	1,007
3	AN	Ambedkar Nagar	Akbarpur	2,398,709	2,372	1,021
4	AM	Amethi	Gauriganj	2,549,935	3,063	830
5	JP	Amroha	Amroha	1,838,771	2,321	818
6	AU	Auraiya	Auraiya	1,372,287	2,051	681
7	FZ	Ayodhya	Ayodhya	2,468,371	2,765	1,054
8	AZ	Azamgarh	Azamgarh	4,616,509	4,053	1,139
9	BG	Bagpat	Baghpat	1,302,156	1,345	986
10	BH	Bahraich	Bahraich	2,384,239	4,926	415
11	BL	Ballia	Ballia	3,223,642	2,981	1,081
12	BP	Balrampur	Balrampur	2,149,066	3,349	642
13	BN	Banda	Banda	1,799,541	4,413	404
14	BB	Barabanki	Barabanki	3,257,983	3,825	739
15	BR	Bareilly	Bareilly	4,465,344	4,120	1,084
16	BS	Basti	Basti	2,461,056	2,687	916
17	BH	Bhadohi	Gyanpur	1,554,203	960	1,531
18	BI	Bijnor	Bijnor	3,683,896	4,561	808
19	BD	Budaun	Budaun	3,712,738	5,168	718
20	BU	Bulandshahr	Bulandshahr	3,498,507	3,719	788
21	CD	Chandauli	Chandauli	1,952,713	2,554	768
22	CT	Chitrakoot	Karwi	990,626	3,202	315
23	DE	Deoria	Deoria	3,098,637	2,535	1,220
24	ET	Etah	Etah	1,761,152	2,456	717
25	EW	Etawah	Etawah	1,579,160	2,287	683
26	FR	Farrukhabad	Fatehgarh	1,887,577	2,279	865
27	FT	Fatehpur	Fatehpur	2,632,684	4,152	634
28	FI	Firozabad	Firozabad	2,496,761	2,361	1,044
29	GB	Gautam Buddha Nagar	Noida	1,674,714	1,269	1,252
30	GZ	Ghaziabad	Ghaziabad	4,661,452	1,175	3,967
31	GP	Ghazipur	Ghazipur	3,622,727	3,377	1,072
32	GN	Gonda	Gonda	3,431,386	4,425	857
33	GR	Gorakhpur	Gorakhpur	4,436,275	3,325	1,336
34	HM	Hamirpur	Hamirpur	1,104,021	4,325	268
35	PN	Hapur	Hapur	1,338,211	660	2,028
36	HR	Hardoi	Hardoi	4,091,380	5,986	683
37	HT	Hathras	Hathras	1,565,678	1,752	851
38	JL	Jalaun	Orai	1,670,718	4,565	366
39	JU	Jaunpur	Jaunpur	4,476,072	4,038	1,108
40	JH	Jhansi	Jhansi	2,000,755	5,024	398
41	KJ	Kannauj	Kannauj	1,658,005	1,993	792
42	KD	Kanpur Dehat	Akbarpur	1,795,092	3,021	594
43	KN	Kanpur Nagar	Kanpur	4,572,951	3,156	1,415
44	KR	Kasganj	Kasganj	1,438,156	1,955	736
45	KS	Kaushambi	Manjhanpur	1,596,909	1,837	897
46	KU	Kushinagar	Padrauna	3,560,830	2,909	1,226
47	LK	Lakhimpur Kheri	Lakhimpur	4,013,634	7,674	523
48	LA	Lalitpur	Lalitpur	1,218,002	5,039	242
49	LU	Lucknow	Lucknow	4,588,455	2,528	1,815
50	MG	Maharajganj	Maharajganj	2,665,292	2,953	903
51	MH	Mahoba	Mahoba	876,055	2,847	288
52	MP	Mainpuri	Mainpuri	1,847,194	2,760	670
53	MT	Mathura	Mathura	2,541,894	3,333	761
54	MB	Mau	Mau	2,205,170	1,713	1,287
55	ME	Meerut	Meerut	3,447,405	2,522	1,342
56	MI	Mirzapur	Mirzapur	2,494,533	4,522	561
57	MO	Moradabad	Moradabad	4,773,138	3,718	1,284
58	MU	Muzaffarnagar	Muzaffarnagar	4,138,605	4,008	1,033
59	PI	Pilibhit	Pilibhit	2,037,225	3,499	567
60	PR	Pratapgarh	Pratapgarh	3,173,752	3,717	854
61	AH	Prayagraj	Prayagraj	5,959,798	5,481	1,087
62	RB	Raebareli	Raebareli	3,404,004	4,609	739
63	RA	Rampur	Rampur	2,335,398	2,367	987
64	SA	Saharanpur	Saharanpur	3,464,228	3,689	939
65	SM	Sambhal	Sambhal	2,217,020	2453	890
66	SK	Sant Kabir Nagar	Khalilabad	1,714,300	1,442	1,014
67	SJ	Shahjahanpur	Shahjahanpur	3,002,376	4,575	673
68	SH	Shamli	Shamli	1,274,815	1,063	1,200
69	SV	Shravasti	Shravasti	1,114,615	1,948	572
70	SN	Siddharthnagar	Naugarh	2,553,526	2,751	882
71	SI	Sitapur	Sitapur	4,474,446	5,743	779
72	SO	Sonbhadra	Robertsganj	1,862,612	6,788	274
73	SU	Sultanpur	Sultanpur	3,790,922	4,436	855
74	UN	Unnao	Unnao	3,110,595	4,561	682
75	VA	Varanasi	Varanasi	3,682,194	1,535	2,399

=== Uttarakhand (UK) ===
#	Code	District	Headquarters	Population (2011)	Area (km^{2})	Density (/km^{2})
1	AL	Almora	Almora	621,927	3,090	198
2	BA	Bageshwar	Bageshwar	259,840	2,310	116
3	CL	Chamoli	Gopeshwar	391,114	7,692	49
4	CP	Champawat	Champawat	259,315	1,781	147
5	DD	Dehradun	Dehradun	1,698,560	3,088	550
6	HA	Haridwar	Haridwar	1,927,029	2,360	817
7	NA	Nainital	Nainital	955,128	3,853	225
8	PG	Pauri Garhwal	Pauri	686,527	5,438	129
9	PI	Pithoragarh	Pithoragarh	485,993	7,110	69
10	RP	Rudraprayag	Rudraprayag	236,857	1,896	119
11	TG	Tehri Garhwal	New Tehri	616,409	4,085	169
12	US	Udham Singh Nagar	Rudrapur	1,648,367	2,912	648
13	UT	Uttarkashi	Uttarkashi	329,686	7,951	41

=== West Bengal (WB) ===
#	Code	District	Headquarters	Population (2011)	Area (km^{2})	Density (/km^{2})
1	AD	Alipurduar	Alipurduar	1,501,983	3,136	479
2	BN	Bankura	Bankura	3,596,292	6,882	523
3	BI	Birbhum	Suri	3,502,387	4,545	771
4	KB	Cooch Behar	Cooch Behar	2,822,780	3,387	833
5	DD	Dakshin Dinajpur	Balurghat	1,670,931	2,183	753
6	DA	Darjeeling	Darjeeling	1,595,181	2,093	762
7	HG	Hooghly	Chinsurah	5,520,389	3,149	1,753
8	HR	Howrah	Howrah	4,841,638	1,467	3,300
9	JA	Jalpaiguri	Jalpaiguri	3,869,675	6,227	621
10	JH	Jhargram	Jhargram	1,136,548	3,038	374
11	KA	Kalimpong	Kalimpong	251,642	1,054	239
12	KO	Kolkata	Kolkata	4,486,679	206.08	24,252
13	MA	Maldah	English Bazar	3,997,970	3,733	1,071
14	MSD	Murshidabad	Baharampur	7,102,430	5,324	1,334
15	NA	Nadia	Krishnanagar	5,168,488	3,927	1,316
16	PN	North 24 Parganas	Barasat	10,082,852	4,094	2,463
17	BR	Paschim Bardhaman	Asansol	2,882,031	1,603	1,798
18	PM	Paschim Medinipur	Midnapore	4,776,909	6,308	757
19	BR	Purba Bardhaman	Bardhaman	4,835,532	5,433	890
20	PR	Purba Medinipur	Tamluk	5,095,875	4,736	1,076
21	PU	Purulia	Purulia	2,927,965	6,259	468
22	PS	South 24 Parganas	Alipore	8,161,961	9,960	819
23	UD	Uttar Dinajpur	Raiganj	3,000,849	3,180	956

== Union territories ==
=== Andaman and Nicobar (AN) ===
#	Code	District	Headquarters	Population (2011)	Area (km^{2})	Density (/km^{2})
1	NI	Nicobar	Car Nicobar	36,842	1,841	20
2	NA	North and Middle Andaman	Mayabunder	105,597	3,736	28
3	SA	South Andaman	Port Blair	238,142	2,672	89

=== Chandigarh (CH) ===
#	Code	District	Headquarters	Population (2011)	Area (km^{2})	Density (/km^{2})
1	CH	Chandigarh	Chandigarh	1,055,450	114	9,258

=== Dadra and Nagar Haveli and Daman and Diu (DD) ===
#	Code	District	Headquarters	Population (2011)	Area (km^{2})	Density (/km^{2})
1	DN	Dadra and Nagar Haveli	Silvassa	343,709	491	700
2	DA	Daman	Daman	191,173	72	2,651
3	DI	Diu	Diu	52,074	39	2,058

=== Jammu and Kashmir (JK) ===
#	Code	District	Headquarters	Population (2011)	Area (km^{2})	Density (/km^{2})
1	AN	Anantnag	Anantnag	1,070,144	2853	375
2	BD	Budgam	Budgam	735,753	1406	537
3	BPR	Bandipore	Bandipore	385,099	3,010	128
4	BR	Baramulla	Baramulla	1,015,503	3329	305
5	DO	Doda	Doda	409,576	2,625	79
6	GB	Ganderbal	Ganderbal	297,003	1979	151
7	JA	Jammu	Jammu	1,526,406	3,097	596
8	KT	Kathua	Kathua	615,711	2,651	232
9	KW	Kishtwar	Kishtwar	230,696	7,737	30
10	KG	Kulgam	Kulgam	422,786	457	925
11	KU	Kupwara	Kupwara	875,564	2,379	368
12	PO	Poonch	Poonch	476,820	1,674	285
13	PU	Pulwama	Pulwama	570,060	1,398	598
14	RA	Rajouri	Rajouri	619,266	2,630	235
15	RB	Ramban	Ramban	283,313	1,330	213
16	RS	Reasi	Reasi	314,714	1710	184
17	SB	Samba	Samba	318,611	913	318
18	SH	Shopian	Shopian	265,960	312	852
19	SR	Srinagar	Srinagar	1,269,751	2,228	703
20	UD	Udhampur	Udhampur	555,357	4,550	211

=== Ladakh (LA) ===
#	Code	District	Headquarters	Population (2011)	Area (km^{2})	Density (/km^{2})
1	KR	Kargil	Kargil	143,388	14,036	10
2	LE	Leh	Leh	133,487	45,110	3
3	DR	Drass	Drass	45,000	2,646	17
4	ZA	Zanskar	Padum	20,000	3,000	7
5	NB	Nubra	Diskit	35,000	9,500	4
6	CH	Changthang	Nyoma	25,000	21,000	1
7	SH	Sham	Khalatse	15,000	14,086	1
8	SK	Sankoo	Sankoo	4,000	40,548	1

=== Lakshadweep (LD) ===
#	Code	District	Headquarters	Population (2011)	Area (km^{2})	Density (/km^{2})
1	LD	Lakshadweep	Kavaratti	64,473	30	2,149

=== National Capital Territory of Delhi (DL) ===
#	Code	District	Headquarters	Population (2011)	Area (km^{2})	Density (/km^{2})
1	CD	Central Delhi	Daryaganj	582,320	25	27,730
2	ED	East Delhi	Preet Vihar	1,709,346	440	27,132
3	ND	New Delhi	Connaught Place	142,004	22	4,057
4	NO	North Delhi	Sadar Bazaar	887,978	59	14,557
5	NE	North East Delhi	Seelampur	2,241,624	52	36,155
6	NW	North West Delhi	Kanjhawala	3,656,539	130	8,254
7	SH	Shahdara	Nand Nagri	322,931	60	59,703
8	SD	South Delhi	Saket	2,731,929	250	11,060
9	SE	South East Delhi	Defence Colony	1,500,636	102	15,000
10	SW	South West Delhi	Vasant Vihar	2,292,958	395	5,446
11	WD	West Delhi	Rajouri Garden	2,543,243	112	19,563

=== Puducherry (PY) ===
#	Code	District	Headquarters	Population (2011)	Area (km^{2})	Density (/km^{2})
1	KA	Karaikal	Karaikal	200,222	157	1,275
2	MA	Mahé	Mahé	41,816	9	4,646
3	PO	Puducherry	Pondicherry	950,289	293	3,232
4	YA	Yanam	Yanam	55,626	30	1,854

== See also ==
- Administrative divisions of India
- Municipalities of India
- Districts of British India

== Footnotes ==
=== References ===
Union Territories

- District Census Handbook – Andaman & Nicobar Islands (PDF). Directorate of Census Operations – GoI. 2011.
- District Census Handbook – Chandigarh (PDF). Directorate of Census Operations – GoI. 2011.
- District Census Handbook – Dadra and Nagar Haveli (PDF). Directorate of Census Operations – GoI. 2011.
- District Census Handbook – Daman (PDF). Directorate of Census Operations – GoI. 2011.
- District Census Handbook – Diu (PDF). Directorate of Census Operations – GoI. 2011.
- District Census Handbook – Lakshadweep (PDF). Directorate of Census Operations – GoI. 2011.
- District Census Handbook – N.C.T. of Delhi (PDF). Directorate of Census Operations – GoI. 2011.
- District Census Handbook – Puducherry – Karaikal (PDF). Directorate of Census Operations – GoI. 2011.
- District Census Handbook – Puducherry – Mahe (PDF). Directorate of Census Operations – GoI. 2011.
- District Census Handbook – Puducherry – Puducherry (PDF). Directorate of Census Operations – GoI. 2011.
- District Census Handbook – Puducherry – Yanam (PDF). Directorate of Census Operations – GoI. 2011.
