= New Chalrang =

- village
- Location in Mizoram, India New Chalrang (India)
- Coordinates: 23.3793824°N 93.1340551°E
- Country: India
- State: Mizoram
- District: Khawzawl
- Block: Khawzawl
- Elevation: 1,281 m (4,203 ft)

Population (2011)
  - Total: 550
- Time zone: UTC+5:30 (IST)
- 2011 census code: 271332

New Chalrang is a village in the Khawzawl district of Mizoram, India. It is located in the Khawzawl R.D. Block.

== Demographics ==
According to the 2011 census of India, New Chalrang has 101 households. The effective literacy rate (i.e. the literacy rate of population excluding children aged 6 and below) is 98.09%.

Demographics (2011 Census)
| | Total | Male | Female |
|---|---|---|---|
| Population | 550 | 271 | 279 |
| Children aged below 6 years | 78 | 34 | 44 |
| Scheduled caste | 0 | 0 | 0 |
| Scheduled tribe | 541 | 267 | 274 |
| Literates | 463 | 233 | 230 |
| Workers (all) | 291 | 140 | 151 |
| Main workers (total) | 244 | 128 | 116 |
| Main workers: Cultivators | 223 | 114 | 109 |
| Main workers: Agricultural labourers | 0 | 0 | 0 |
| Main workers: Household industry workers | 0 | 0 | 0 |
| Main workers: Other | 21 | 14 | 7 |
| Marginal workers (total) | 47 | 12 | 35 |
| Marginal workers: Cultivators | 47 | 12 | 35 |
| Marginal workers: Agricultural labourers | 0 | 0 | 0 |
| Marginal workers: Household industry workers | 0 | 0 | 0 |
| Marginal workers: Others | 0 | 0 | 0 |
| Non-workers | 259 | 131 | 128 |
