= Aiduzawl =

- village
- Location in Mizoram, India Aiduzawl (India)
- Coordinates: 23.7002525°N 93.1811039°E
- Country: India
- State: Mizoram
- District: Champhai
- Block: Khawzawl
- Elevation: 1,432 m (4,698 ft)

Population (2011)
  - Total: 326
- Time zone: UTC+5:30 (IST)
- 2011 census code: 271312

Aiduzawl is a village in the Khawzawl district of Mizoram, India. It is located in the Khawzawl R.D. Block.

== Demographics ==
According to the 2011 census of India, Aiduzawl has 61 households. The effective literacy rate (i.e. the literacy rate of population excluding children aged 6 and below) is 96.97%.

Demographics (2011 Census)
| | Total | Male | Female |
|---|---|---|---|
| Population | 326 | 161 | 165 |
| Children aged below 6 years | 62 | 26 | 36 |
| Scheduled caste | 0 | 0 | 0 |
| Scheduled tribe | 320 | 156 | 164 |
| Literates | 256 | 132 | 124 |
| Workers (all) | 181 | 91 | 90 |
| Main workers (total) | 180 | 90 | 90 |
| Main workers: Cultivators | 173 | 85 | 88 |
| Main workers: Agricultural labourers | 2 | 1 | 1 |
| Main workers: Household industry workers | 1 | 1 | 0 |
| Main workers: Other | 4 | 3 | 1 |
| Marginal workers (total) | 1 | 1 | 0 |
| Marginal workers: Cultivators | 1 | 1 | 0 |
| Marginal workers: Agricultural labourers | 0 | 0 | 0 |
| Marginal workers: Household industry workers | 0 | 0 | 0 |
| Marginal workers: Others | 0 | 0 | 0 |
| Non-workers | 145 | 70 | 75 |
