= Basar, Arunachal Pradesh =

Basar
- town
- Location in Arunachal Pradesh, India Basar (India)
- Coordinates: 27°59′0″N 94°40′0″E
- Country: India
- State: Arunachal Pradesh
- District: Lepa-Rada
- Elevation: 578 m (1,896 ft)

Languages
  - Official: English
- Time zone: UTC+5:30 (IST)
- PIN: 791101
- Telephone code: 03795
- ISO 3166 code: IN-AR
- Vehicle registration: AR25
- Coastline: 0 kilometres (0 mi)
- Nearest city: Aalo

Basar is a census town in Lepa-Rada district in the state of Arunachal Pradesh, India. Basar is the abode of Galo people. Basar is subdivided into two zila segments. Basar is the headquarters of the Leparada District. It also has the Bascon festival. Basar has three rivers namely Kidi, Hii and Hiile.

== Geography ==
Basar is located at 27°59′N 94°40′E. It has an average elevation of 578 meters above mean sea level and has pleasantly cold weather.

== Demographics ==
According to the 2001 India census, Basar has a population of 3834 Galo (Tribe) people. Males make up 56% of the population and females form 44%. Basar has a mean literacy rate of 72%, higher than the countrywide mean of 59.5%. 61% of the males and 39% of the females are literate. 16% of the population is made up of children less than 6 years of age. It has a population density of 11 person per km^{2}.

The staple crop of the Galo people of Basar is rice, maize in slash-and-burn agricultural practice. The plains of the Basar valley has wet rice cultivation. Oranges and pineapple have grown abundantly and kiwifruit and apple are tried in the higher ridges of the mountainous ranges. Basar is the original place of Riba, Basar, and Riram clans of Galo tribe and they live in over 65 hill villages, traditionally each keeping to itself under a selected chief styled Gaon Burra (British-era development) who moderates the village council, which acts even as the traditional court. The olden day councils consist of all the village elders and decisions were taken in a dere.

== Education ==
Key institutions currently under Basar Circle are 1) Indian Council of Agricultural Research (ICAR), Basar 2) Government Model College affiliated to Rajiv Gandhi University (RGU), Itanagar 3) Tomi Polytechnic College affiliated to APSCTE 4) Government Higher Secondary School, Basar 5) Government Secondary School, Bam 6) Government Secondary School, Old Market Basar 7) Vivekananda Kendra Vidyalaya, Old Market Basar 8) SFS school, Gori

== Language ==
The dialect spoken by Galo people in Basar is GALO (Lare), which is one of the sub-dialect of galo tribes. Hindi is also popular language of GALO tribe.

The dress of the Galo people in Basar is worn by both sexes are self-woven beke tied around the bosom and gale wrapped around the body below the navel region to toes completely covering the lower portion in women. The men wear a self-woven sleeveless shirt called Tango which is covered by a raw silk cloth zera wrapped over the shoulder. The lower portion is covered by a loincloth called haabe which is passed in between the buttock, folded towards the pubis, and which hangs on a belt-like deerskin leather embedded with semiprecious stones and corals. The head is covered with a cap-like covering called bolup hand-crafted from cane, which acted as a helmet during olden warfighting.

Tattooing in any form was not practiced in the Galo people of the Basar area.

The economy of a family is measured on the possession of animals called "hobe" or mithun (Bos frontalis).

== Festivals and dances ==
The mother of festival "Mopin," an agricultural festival performed before or after the sowing of seeds for bumper crops, is celebrated in Basar in wider ways. Popir song and dance of "Mopin" are performed during this festival.

The BASCON festival is held annually in November, celebrating the tribal art and culture of the local Galo tribe.

== Religion ==
The "Donyi-Polo" practice of the Galo people have the majority following, which involves the chanting of rhymes to appease the ancestors to invoke the blessings of the sun and the moon, where the priest called "Nyibu" plays a crucial role as an intermediary between the Donyi-polo and the people.

Basar is yet to be circumscribed by any independent government media agency.
