= BASCON Festival =

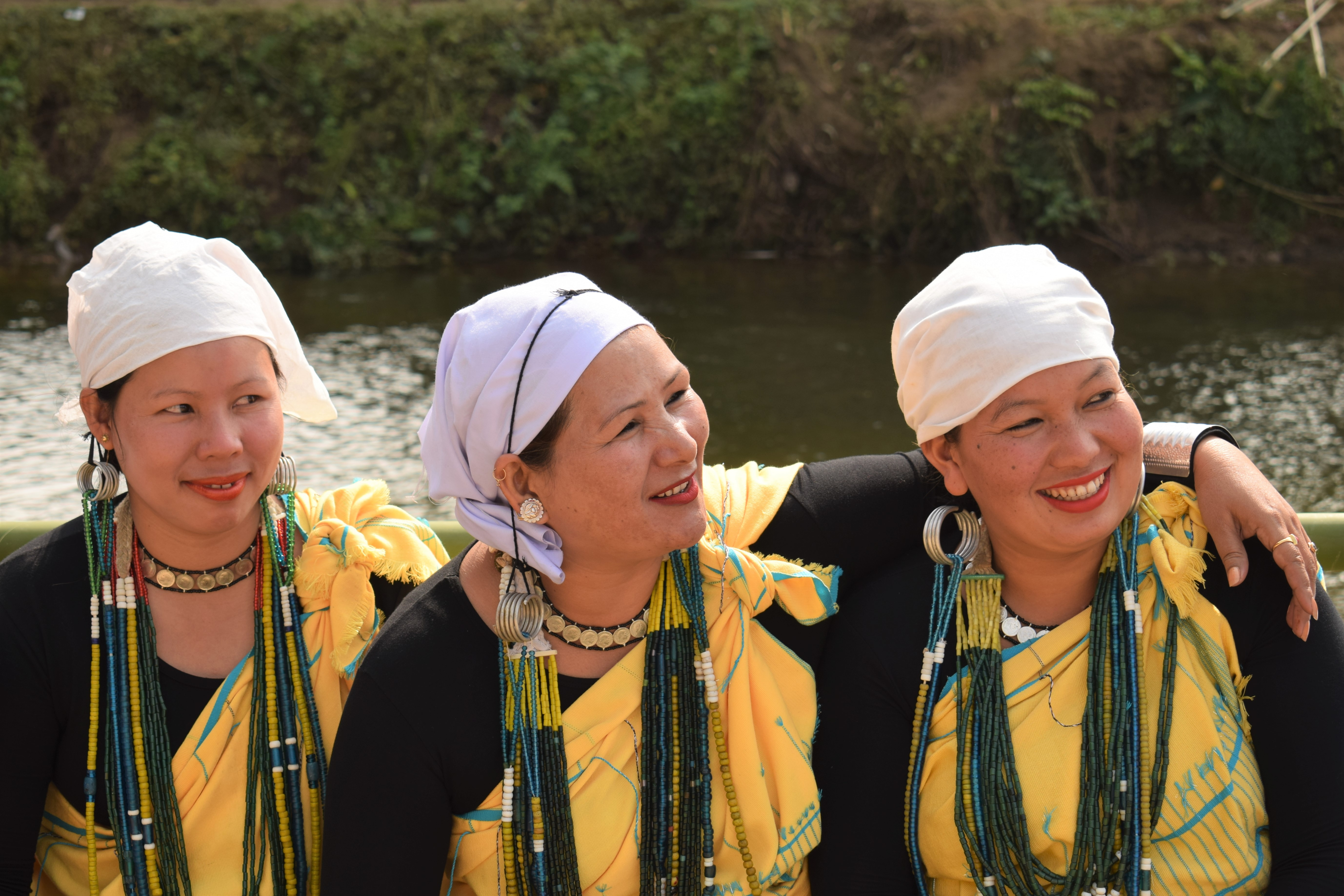
A traditional Galo dance in progress at the BASCON festival in Basar, Arunachal Pradesh.

The BASCON festival is a festival held annually in November at a place called Basar which is the headquarters of the Leparada District in the North-East Indian state of Arunachal Pradesh. The festival is an organic festival that celebrates the tribal art and culture of the local Galo tribe. The festival is a three-day affair and is a community effort with every member of the Galo tribe lending a helping hand.

== Background ==
The BASCON festival is the brainchild of an organization called Gumin Rego Kilaju (GRK), which is working for the social and economic development of the area and the Galo tribe in a sustainable and environment-friendly way.

The BASCON festival is held on the banks of the confluence of two rivers named Hie and Kidi near the town of Basar in Arunachal Pradesh, India.

== Activities ==
The BASCON Festival showcases the culture and heritage of the Galo tribe over a three day long cultural extravaganza. The festival is held in the month of November and is an annual event. Various colourful dances which form an integral part of the various ceremonies of the Galo tribe are presented at the festival. These include dances that are performed at weddings, festivals, and other occasions.
