= Niuland =

- Town
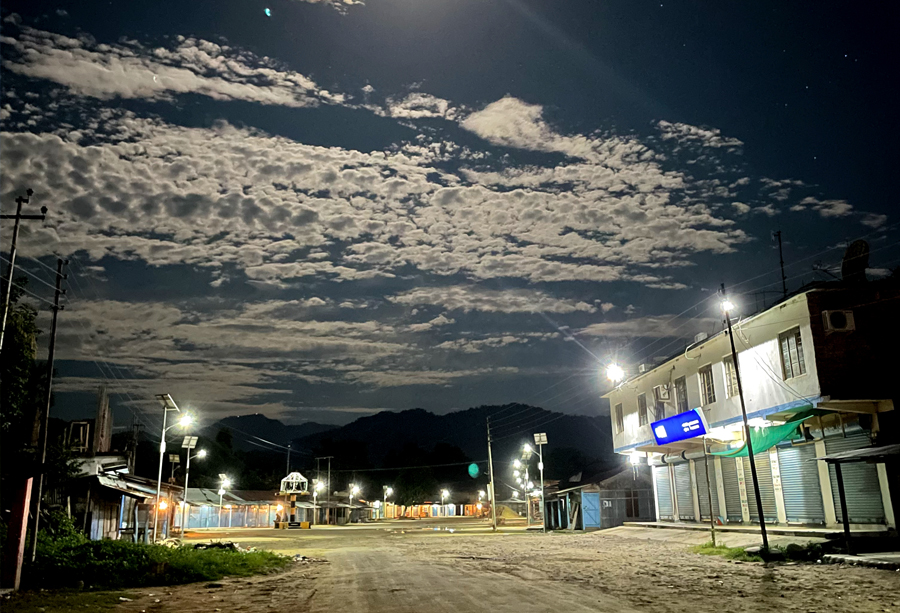
- Niuland

- Location in Nagaland, India Niuland (India)
- Coordinates: 25.9089°N 93.9899°E
- Country: India
- State: Nagaland
- District: Niuland District

Population (2011)
  - Total: 1,158
- Time zone: UTC+5:30 (IST)
- PIN: 797109

Niuland is the headquarters of the Niuland District of the Indian state of Nagaland. It has several villages including Niuland.

It is inhabited by various Naga tribes of the state with sizable population of Sumi Nagas.
