= List of districts of Mizoram =

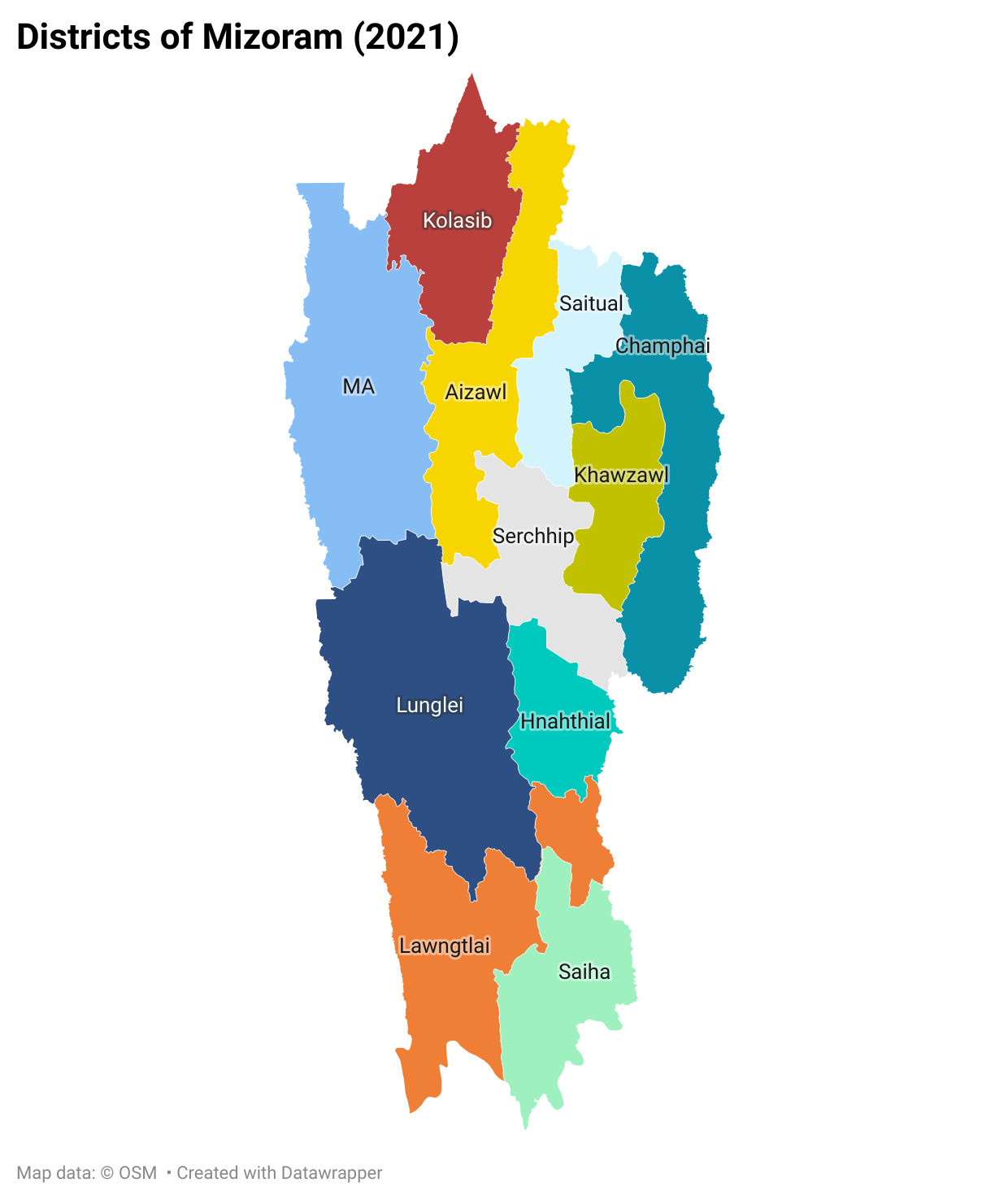
Present-day 11 districts of Mizoram

The Indian state of Mizoram is divided into 11 districts.

== Historical Administrative Divisions ==
In 1895, Mizo Hills (i.e. Mizoram) were formally declared as part of the British-India by a proclamation.

In 1898, North and South hills were united into Lushai Hills district under Assam with Aizawl as its headquarters.

On 21 January 1972, Mizoram became a union territory under the North-Eastern Areas (Reorganisation) Act, 1971, and it was divided into three districts, namely Aizawl, Lunglei and Chhimtuipui.

On 20th February 1987, Mizoram became a state and five more districts were carved out of the already existing three districts.

On 3 June 2019, the Government of Mizoram formally notified 3 new districts, Hnahthial from Lunglei district, Khawzawl from Champhai district, and Saitual from Aizawl district and Champhai district.

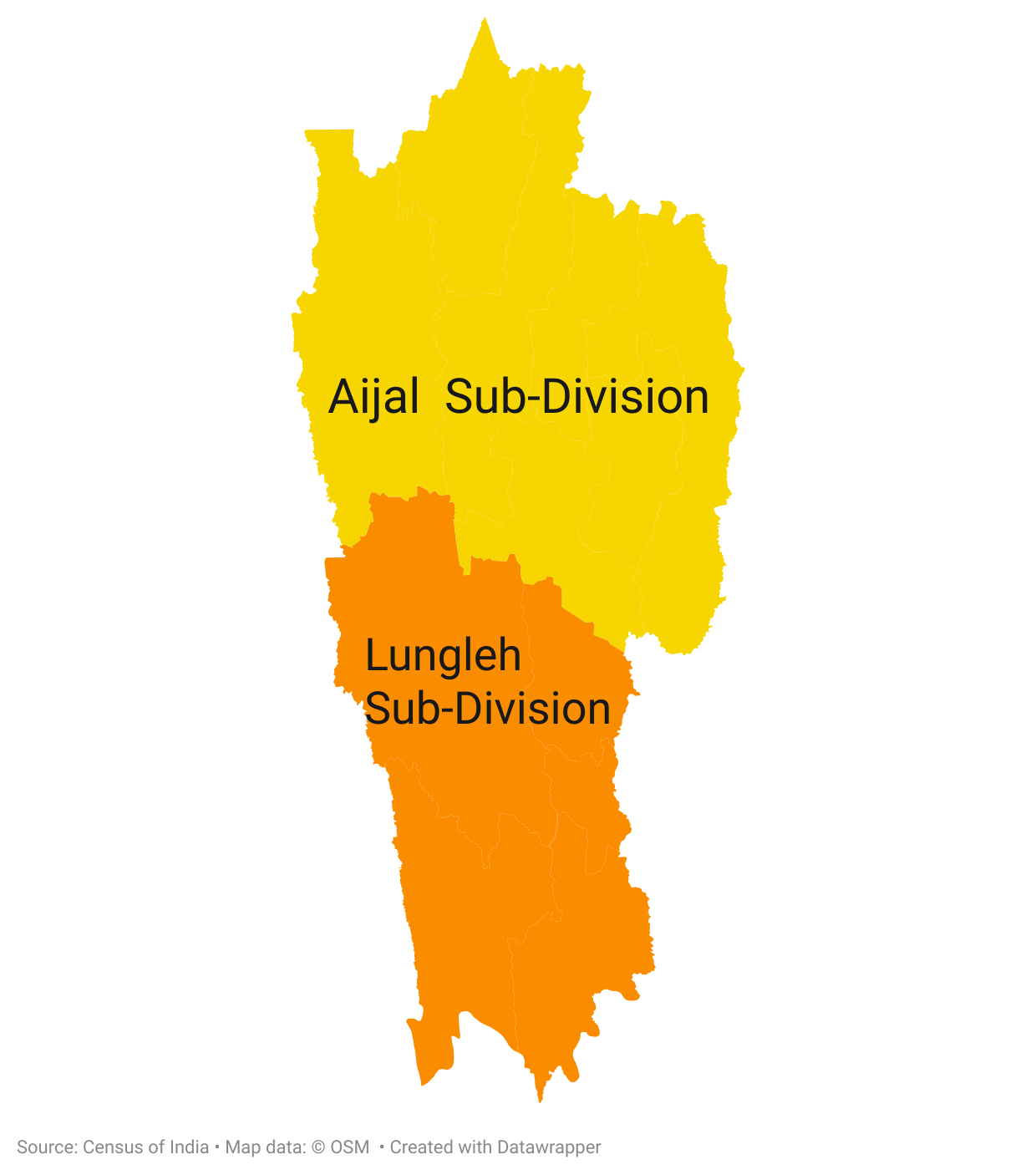
Subdivisions of Mizo District in 1961.

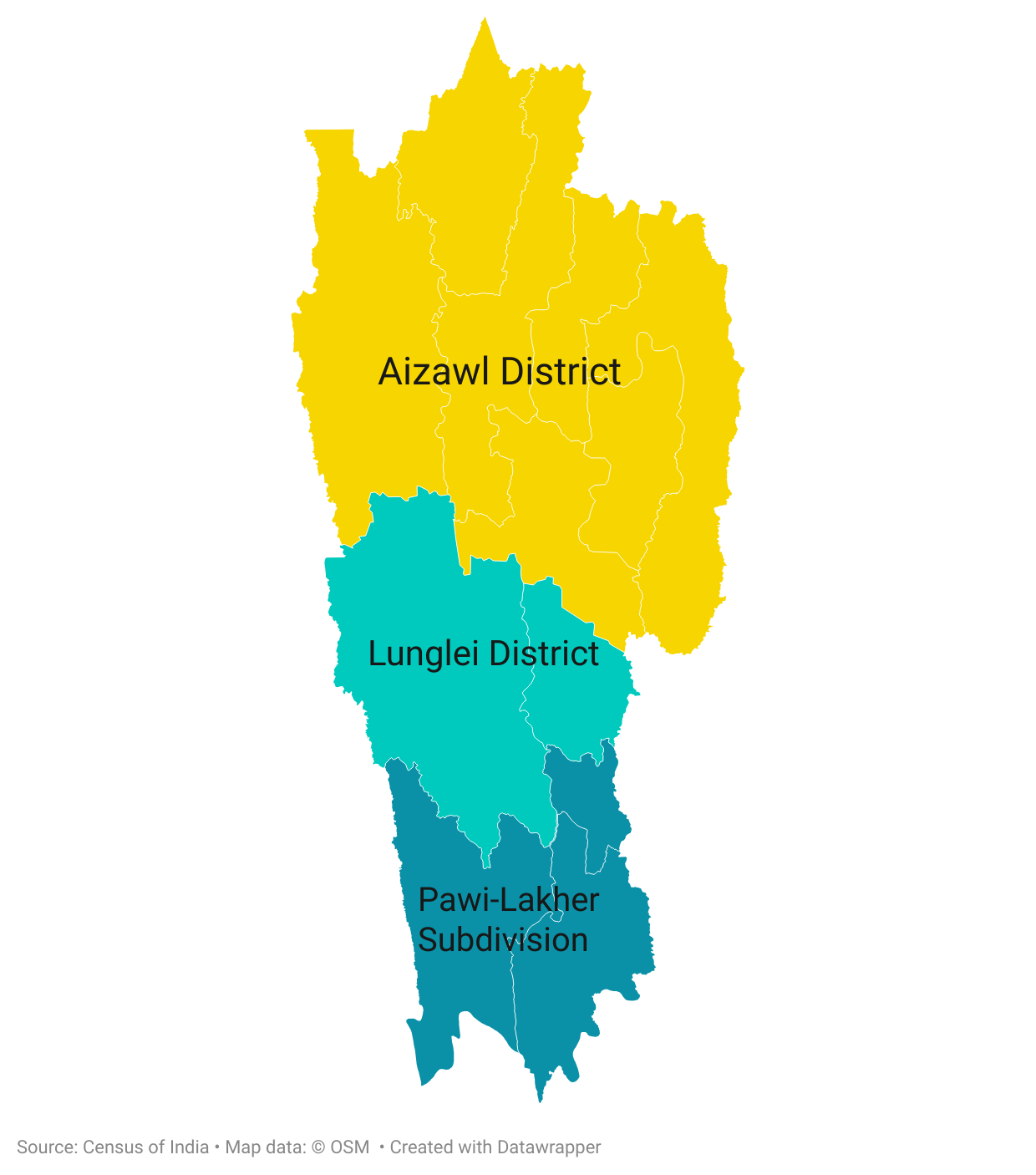
Districts of Union Territory of Mizoram before the North-East Reorganization Act.

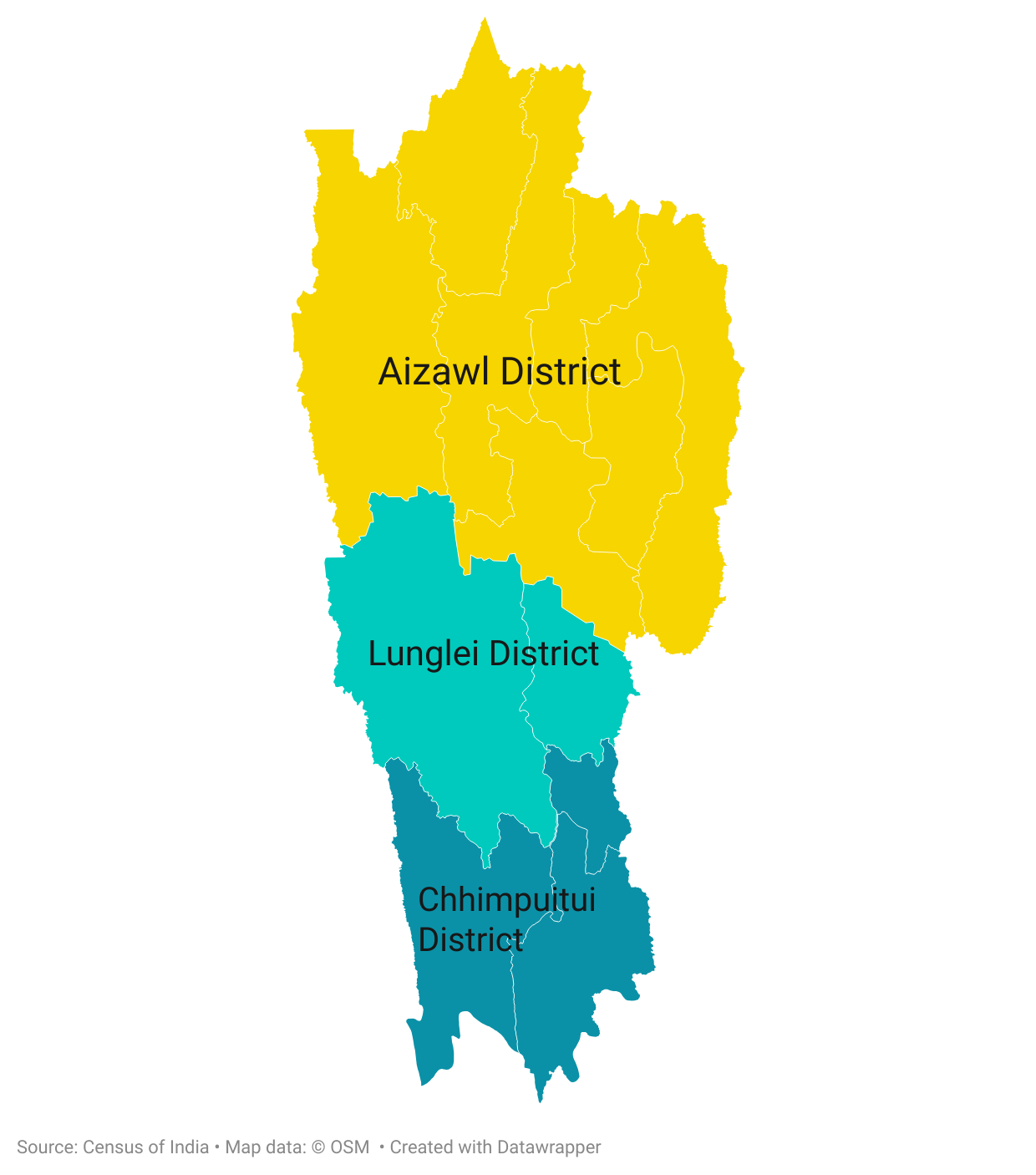
Districts of Union Territory of Mizoram and subsequent State of Mizoram.

== Administrative structure ==
A district of Mizoram is headed by a Deputy Commissioner who is in charge of the administration in that particular district. He has to perform triple functions as he holds three positions as the deputy commissioner, the district magistrate and the district collector. As a deputy commissioner he is the executive head of the district. The district magistrate is responsible for maintaining the law and order situation in the district. As the collector he is the chief revenue officer responsible for revenue collection and recovery.

A superintendent of police controls the police administration of each district.

A district is divided into one or more subdivisions, further divided into tehsils and blocks.

== Districts ==
Sl No	Code	District	Headquarters	Headquarters Coordinates	Established	Area	Population 2001	Population 2011	Population Density 2001	Population Density 2011	Map
1	AI	Aizawl	Aizawl	23.8789° N, 92.8976° E		3,577 km^{2} (1,381 sq mi)	339,812	400,309	95/km^{2} (250/sq mi)	110/km^{2} (290/sq mi)	
2	CH	Champhai	Champhai	23.4566° N, 93.3282° E	1998	3,168 km^{2} (1,223 sq mi)	101,389	125,745	32/km^{2} (83/sq mi)	39/km^{2} (100/sq mi)	
3	HN	Hnahthial	Hnahthial	22.9653° N, 92.9301° E	2019	1,030 km^{2} (397 sq mi)	NA	28,468	NA	27/km^{2} (71/sq mi)	
4	KW	Khawzawl	Khawzawl	23.5345° N, 93.1830° E	2019	1152 km^{2} (444 sq mi)	NA	42,355	NA	36/km^{2} (95/sq mi)	
5	KO	Kolasib	Kolasib	24.2246° N, 92.6760° E	1998	1,386 km^{2} (535 sq mi)	60,977	83,955	44/km^{2} (110/sq mi)	61/km^{2} (160/sq mi)	
6	LA	Lawngtlai	Lawngtlai	22.5284° N, 92.8926° E		2,519 km^{2} (973 sq mi)	73,050	117,894	29/km^{2} (75/sq mi)	46/km^{2} (120/sq mi)	
7	LU	Lunglei	Lunglei	22.8671° N, 92.7655° E		4,572 km^{2} (1,765 sq mi)	137,155	161,428	30/km^{2} (78/sq mi)	36/km^{2} (92/sq mi)	
8	MA	Mamit	Mamit	23.9294° N, 92.4906° E	1998	2,967 km^{2} (1,146 sq mi)	62,313	86,364	21/km^{2} (54/sq mi)	29/km^{2} (74/sq mi)	
9	SI	Saiha	Siaha	22.4897° N, 92.9793° E	1998	1,414 km^{2} (546 sq mi)	60,823	56,574	43/km^{2} (110/sq mi)	40/km^{2} (100/sq mi)	
10	ST	Saitual	Saitual	23.9704° N, 92.5758° E	2019	NA	NA	63,685	NA	NA	
11	SE	Serchhip	Serchhip	23.3417° N, 92.8502° E	1998	1,424 km^{2} (550 sq mi)	55,539	64,937	39/km^{2} (100/sq mi)	46/km^{2} (120/sq mi)	
	Total					21,087 km^{2} (8,142 sq mi)	888,573	1,231,714	42/km^{2} (110/sq mi)	58/km^{2} (151/sq mi)	

== Proposed districts ==
There are several active demands for the creation of new administrative districts in Mizoram. Many of these proposals are driven by the specific governance requirements of the state's autonomous district councils, as well as the need to address geographical isolation and improve healthcare and administrative access in remote areas.

List of Proposed Districts in Mizoram Grouped by Current District
Proposed District	Expected Area of Jurisdiction	Rationale for Creation
Proposed from Kolasib and Aizawl
Sinlung (Sinlung Hills)	Northern tracts spanning parts of Kolasib district and Aizawl district, corresponding to the area under the Sinlung Hills Council.	Demanded to provide full district-level administration and dedicated resource allocation for the Sinlung Hills Council region.
Proposed from Lawngtlai
Chawngte (Chakmastan, Kamalanagar)	The Chawngte sub-division (which includes Kamalanagar), operating under the Chakma Autonomous District Council.	A longstanding demand driven by local population growth, challenging topography, and the specific administrative requirements of the Chakma Autonomous District Council.
Sangau (Lailand)	Eastern region of Lawngtlai district, operating under the Lai Autonomous District Council.	Sought to improve administrative focus, accessibility, and governance autonomy within the Lai Autonomous District Council area.
Bungtlang South	Southern rural tracts of Lawngtlai district.	Proposed to address the extreme geographical remoteness from the current district headquarters, with a primary focus on improving healthcare access and local public service delivery.
Proposed from Lunglei
Tlabung	Western borders of Lunglei district, corresponding to the Tlabung rural development block.	Proposed to elevate the existing administrative block to a full district to ensure better regional governance and border area management.

== See also ==
- Administrative divisions of India
