= Lepa Rada district =

- District of Arunachal Pradesh
- Country: India
- State: Arunachal Pradesh
- Established: 2018
- Headquarters: Basar
- Time zone: UTC+05:30 (IST)
- PIN: 791101
- Website: https://s353fde96fcc4b4ce72d7739202324cd49.s3waas.gov.in

Lepa Rada district, with headquarters at Basar, is one of the 28 districts of Arunachal Pradesh state in northeastern India. Lepa Rada falls under 29-Basar Assembly Constituency and 1-West Parliamentary Constituency. The district is centrally located, hence the name Lepa Rada (Lepa means centre and Rada means bulls-eye like in Archery). Basar, Tirbin, Dari and Sago are 4 administrative circles of the district. It was created from the West Siang district by bifurcating its southern areas along Assam border into a new district.

== History ==
The district was created in 2018 by bifurcating the Lower Siang district.

== Demographics ==
At the time of the 2011 census, Lepa Rada district had a population of 14,490. Scheduled Tribes made up 11,235 (77.54%).

Religions in Lepa Rada district (2011)
Religion	Percent
Donyi-Polo	51.51%
Christianity	27.38%
Hinduism	18.27%
Islam	1.85%
Buddhism	0.81%
Other or not stated	0.18%

At the time of the 2011 census, 71.81% of the population spoke Galo, 4.72% Nepali, 3.78% Bengali, 3.60% Adi, 3.27% Hindi, 2.74% Bhojpuri, 2.67% Assamese and 1.08% Boro as their first language.

== Culture ==
People

Lepa Rada is inhabited by the Galo tribe. Mopin being the main festival of harvest.

== See also ==
- List of districts of Arunachal Pradesh
