= Hnahthial district =

- District of Mizoram
- Location in Mizoram
- Interactive map of Hnahthial district
- Coordinates (Hnahthial): 22.970°N 92.930°E
- Country: India
- State: Mizoram
- Headquarters: Hnahthial

Government
  - Lok Sabha constituencies: Mizoram

Population (2023)
  - Total: 34,524

Demographics
- Time zone: UTC+05:30 (IST)
- Vehicle registration: MZ 11
- Website: hnahthial.nic.in

Hnahthial district is one of the eleven districts of Mizoram state in India. The creation of Hnahthial District was first notified on 12 September 2008 but until 2020, it remained non-functional despite a number of promises made by top political leaders and an all-out effort by Hnahthial District Function Demand Committee to let the state government make it functional. Hnahthial district was made functional only 12 years later on 3 June 2019 with the creation of the office of the Deputy Commissioner. The district headquarters is Hnahthial.

== Geography ==
The district is bounded on the north by Serchhip and on the south by Lawngtlai district, on the west by Lunglei, on the east by Myanmar. Hnahthial town is the administrative headquarters of the district.

== History ==
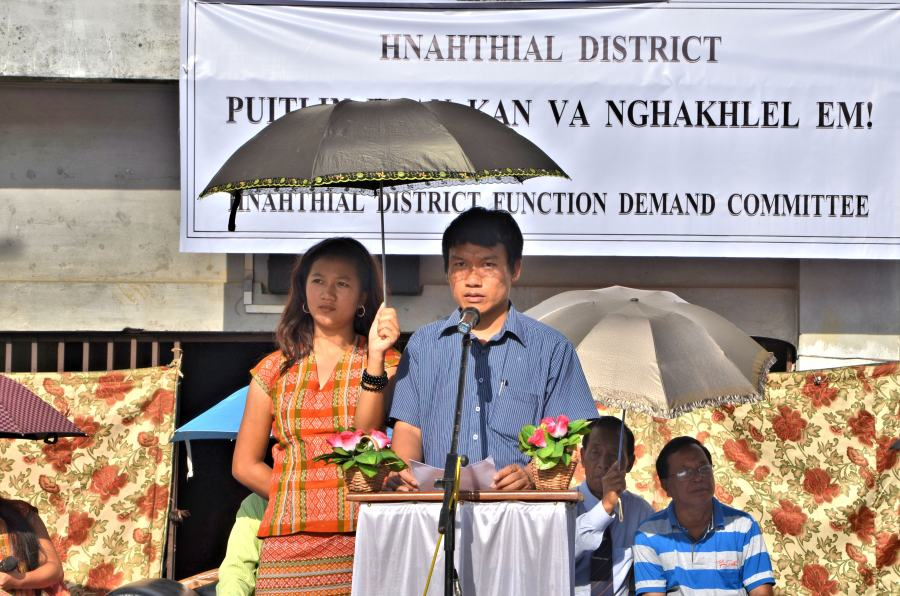
Hnahthial District Demand - Public Meeting on 1 October 2013 - HDFDC Secretary K.Lalhunmawia addressing the people

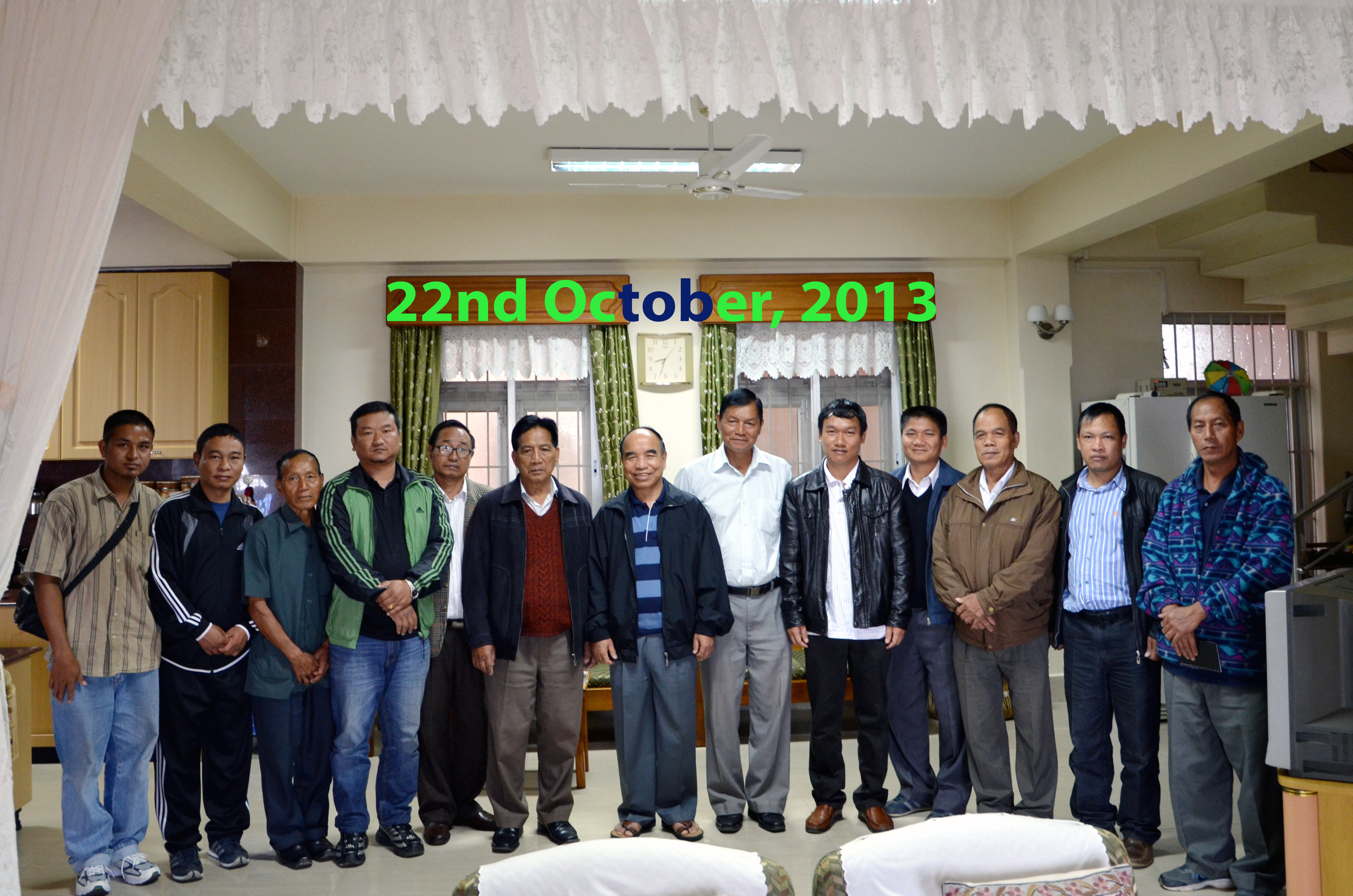
District Demand leaders met with Pu Zoramthanga

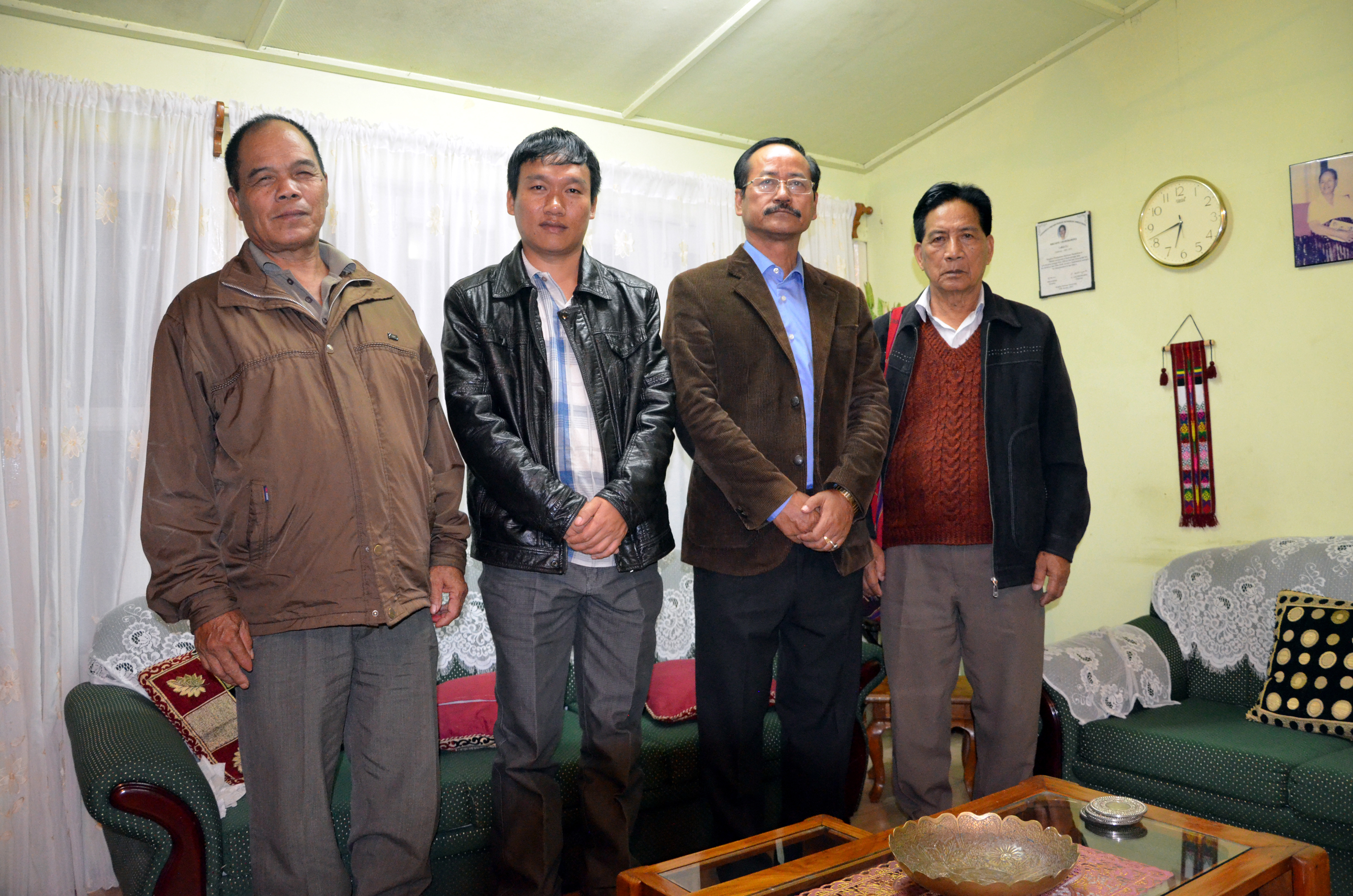
District Demand leaders met with Pu K.Liantlinga

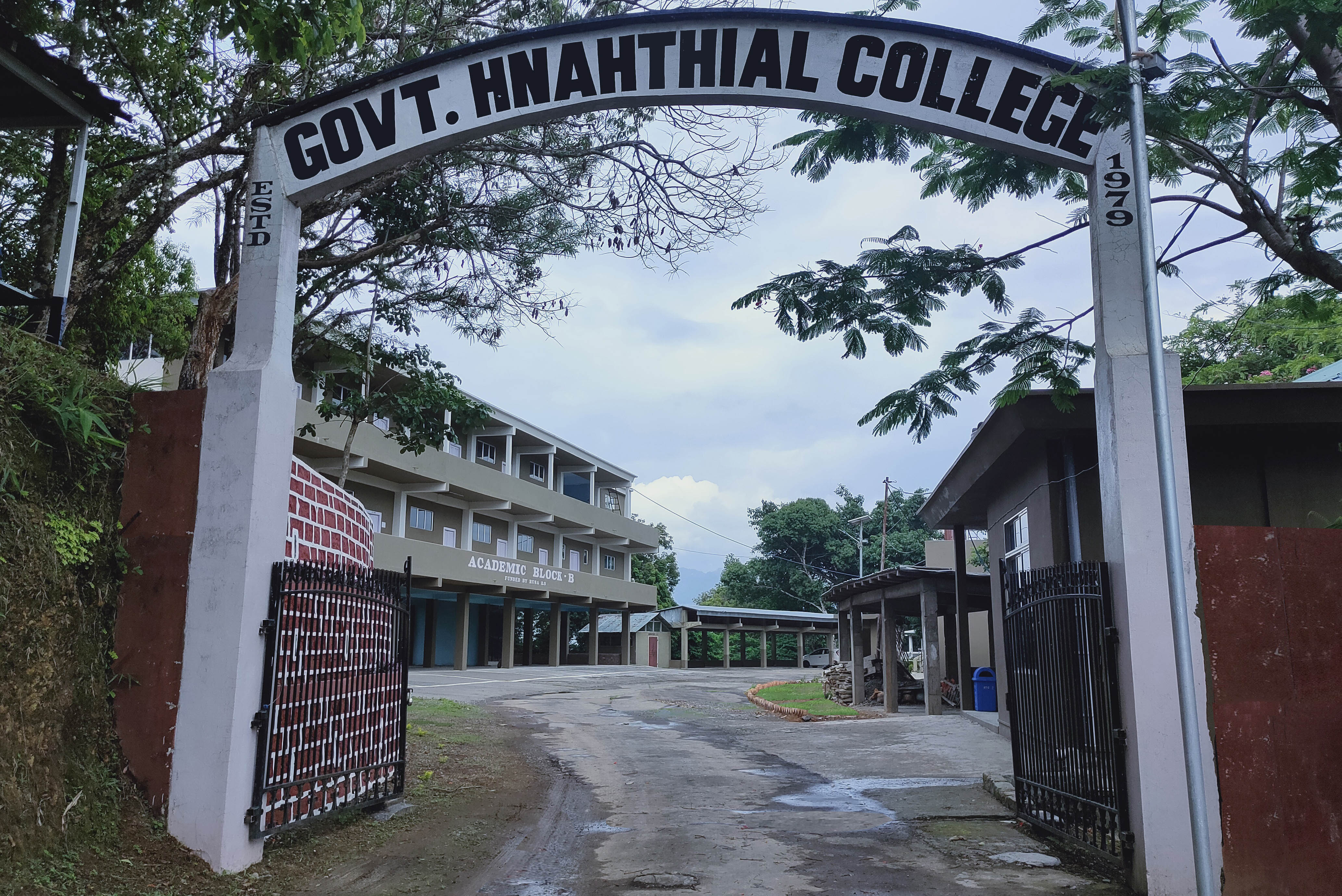
Govt. Hnahthial College main gate

For two decades from 1998 to 2018, the people of Hnahthial demanded for the creation of Hnahthial District through the District Demand Committee later in 2009 renamed as Hnahthial District Function Demand Committee which resorted to various means including Long March from Hnahthial to Aizawl, indefinite fasting, processions, public prayer meetings, Total Bandh, Public Meetings, memorandum and resolutions submitted to the Chief Minister, blockade of NH 54, holding press conferences and a series of talks held with the Chief Minister of Mizoram.

The Government of Mizoram had ordered creation of office of the Deputy Commissioners of Hnahthial District vide a notification dated 3 June 2019, after which the District started becoming operational and since then Hnahthial has become the headquarters of Hnahthial District. The newly formed Hnahthial District held a grand function on 18 October 2019 at the District Headquarter's HBSC Ground No 1 to celebrate creation of the long-awaited District.

At the initiatives of Hnahthial District Function Demand Committee (HDFDC), the leaders of the District Demand Committees from Hnahthial, Khawlzawl and Saitual held talks with leaders of each political parties on 21 and 22 October 2013 in Aizawl. The main aim was to find out the stand of each party on the implementation of the long delayed three new districts already announced by the then MNF-led government on 12 September 2008. The leaders of Hnahthial District Function Demand Committee who left Hnahthial on 21 September 2013 for Aizawl were listed below:

- K.Lalhunmawia, Secretary, HDFDC
- F.Thangluaia, Treasurer, HDFDC
- R.Tlangmawia, a member of Executive Committee, HDFDC

== Divisions ==
The district has three Legislative Assembly constituencies: South Tuipui, Lunglei North, and Lunglei East. There are twenty seven inhabited towns and villages in the district with 5,846 families comprising 28,468 people. There are 14,208 men and 14,260 women. The district capital has 1,548 families with a population of 7,187.

== Towns and villages ==
The main towns and villages in Hnahthial district are:

1. Rawpui
2. Pangzawl
3. Thiltlang
4. South Chawngtui
5. Tarpho
6. Khawhri
7. Aithur
8. Cherhlun
9. Old Ngharchhip
10. New Ngharchhip
11. Thingsai
12. Bualpui H
13. South Lungleng
14. Denlung (Sub-Village)
15. Leite (with Maudarh Sub-Village)
16. Rotlang East
17. Tuipui ‘D’
18. Darzo
19. Muallianpui
20. Lungpuitlang
21. South Vanlaiphai
22. Hnahthial
23. Chhipphir
24. Bualpui V
25. Lungmawi
26. Phaileng South

== Demographics ==
As of the 2011 Census of India, Hnahthial has a population of 7187 of which 3,573 are males while 3,614 are females as per report released by Census India 2011. Hnahthial has an average literacy rate of 97.24%, higher than state average of 91.33%: male literacy is 97.94%, and female literacy is 96.55%. In Hnahthial, 13.18% of the population is under 6 years of age.

Religions in Hnahthial district (2011)
Religion	Percent
Christianity	99.03%
Islam	0.51%
Hinduism	0.42%
Other or not stated	0.04%

Hnahthial district has a population of 28,468 of which 7,187 (25.25%) live in urban areas. Hnahthial has a sex ratio of 1004 females per 1000 males. Scheduled Tribes make up 28,084 (98.65%) of the population. Christians are 28,217 (99.12%) while Muslims are 139 (0.49%). Mizo is the predominant language, spoken by 98.76% of the population as their first language.

== Transport ==
A helicopter service by Pawan Hans has been started which connects Aizawl with Hnahthial. The distance between Hnahthial and Aizawl through NH 54 is 172 km and is connected by a bus and jeep/maxi cab service.
