= Niuland district =

- District of Nagaland
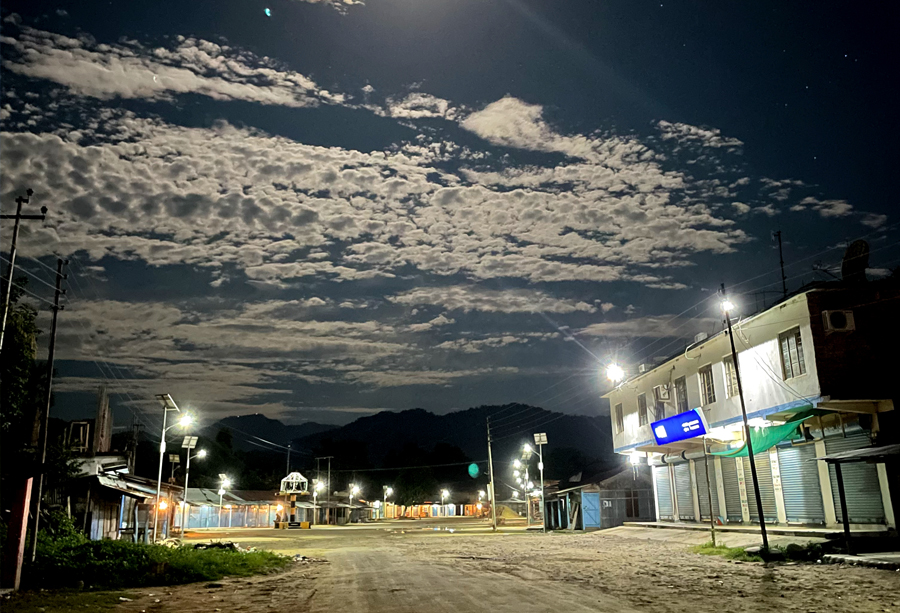
- Niuland
- Nickname: Land of Diversity
- Niuland District in Nagaland
- Coordinates: 25°51′N 93°55′E
- Country: India
- State: Nagaland
- Headquarters: Niuland

Government
  - Lok Sabha Constituency: Nagaland
  - MP: Supongmeren Jamir INC
  - Deputy Commissioner: Sara S Jamir
  - Assembly constituencies: 1 constituencies

Area
  - Water: 483.82 km^{2} (186.80 sq mi)

Population (2011)
  - Total: 42'287
- Time zone: UTC+05:30 (IST)
- Website: niuland.nic.in

Niuland district is the 14th district of the Indian state of Nagaland. It was created on December 18, 2021. The district headquarter is located in the town of Niuland. It is tagged the "Land of diversity" being home to all tribes of the state and a commercially potential district as it is connected to Chümoukedima, Dimapur, Kohima, Wokha and Tseminyü district and Golaghat district of Assam.

== History ==
Niuland District was created on December 18, 2021, as the 14th district of Nagaland. The new district shares boundaries with Chumukedima, Dimapur, Kohima, Wokha and Tseminyu District of Nagaland and Golaghat District of Assam.

== Geography ==
The climate is sub-tropical with a monsoon season.

== Demographics ==
Most of the inhabitants of the district are Nagas, with majority populations of Sümi, followed by Yimkhiung Nagas and various other Naga ethnic groups.

The total literacy rate of Niuland is 93.62% above the state literacy rate of 79.48%. The Child sex ratio is 1,036 which is greater than the Average Sex Ratio of 1,011.

=== Religion ===
Religion in Niuland district (2011)
1. Christianity (85.3%)
2. Hinduism (9.40%)
3. Islam (4.61%)
4. Buddhism (0.62%)
5. Others (0.08%)

Block	Christian	Muslim	Hindu	Other
Niuland	10,130	547	1,116	83
Nihokhu	3,863	4,231	593	12
Kuhoboto	10,359	616	1,506	38
Aquqhnaqua	8,136	258	773	26

According to the 2011 census, Christianity is the religion of Niuland with 85.3% of the population.

== Transportation ==
=== Air ===
The nearest airport is Dimapur Airport.

=== Rail ===
The nearest railway station is the Dimapur railway station.

== See also ==
- Nagaland
