= Hnahthial =

- Town
- Location within Mizoram Location within India
- Coordinates: 22.9826°N 92.9113°E
- Country: India
- State: Mizoram
- District: Hnahthial district

Population (2021)
  - Total: 11,083

Languages
  - Official: Mizo
- Time zone: UTC+5:30 (IST)
- Vehicle registration: MZ 11
- Website: mizoram.nic.in

Hnahthial ([hnahˈthial]) is the headquarters of Hnahthial district in the Indian state of Mizoram. The term Hnahthial is a Mizo term that means Phrynium capitatum, a plant that grows abundantly in Hnahthial.

== Demographics ==
As of the 2011 Census of India, Hnahthial has a population of 7187 of which 3,573 are males while 3,614 are females as per report released by Census India 2011. Hnahthial has an average literacy rate of 97.24%, higher than state average of 91.33%: male literacy is 97.94%, and female literacy is 96.55%. In Hnahthial, 13.18% of the population is under 6 years of age.

== Education ==
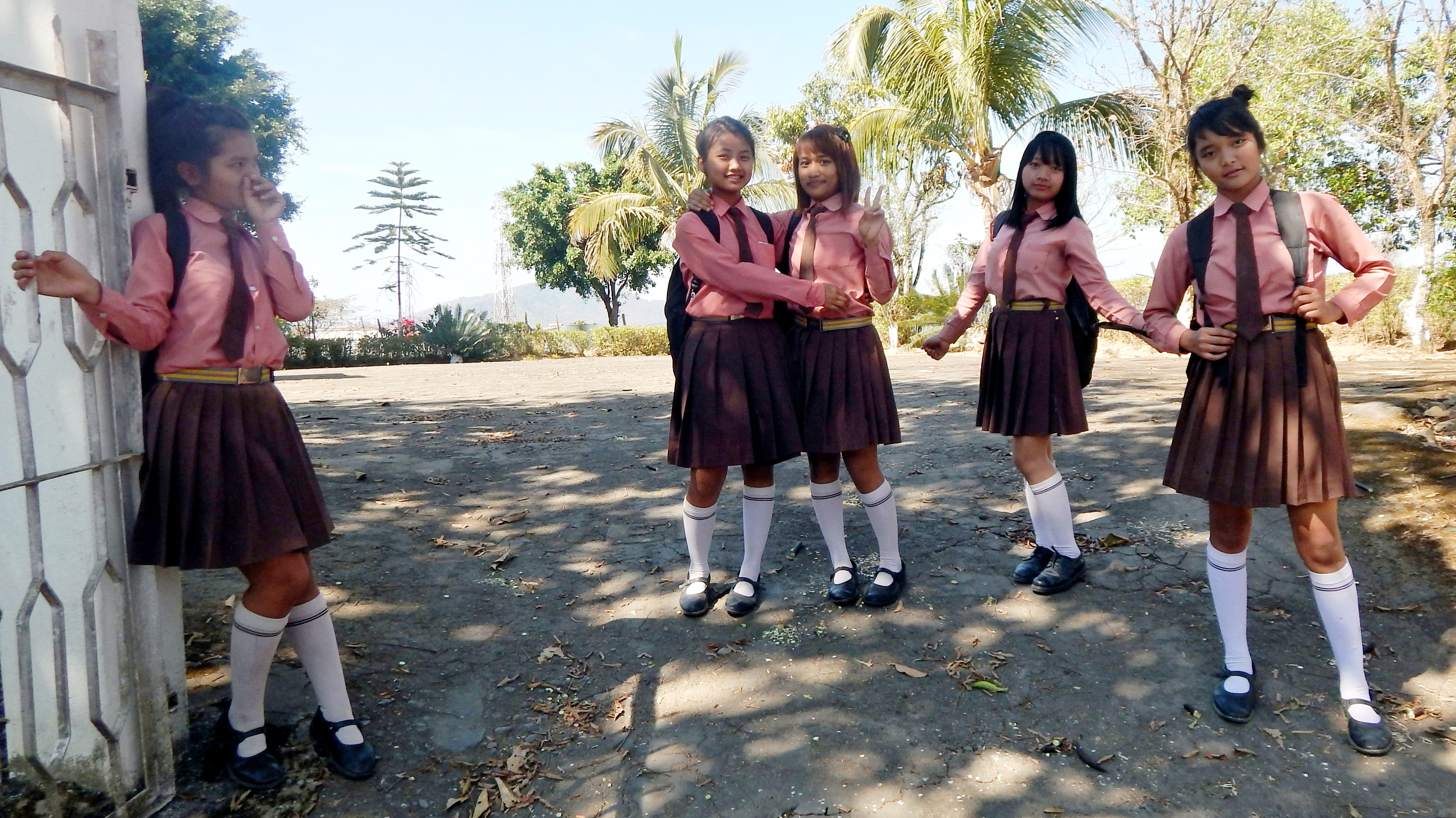
Nuchhungi English medium schoolgirls

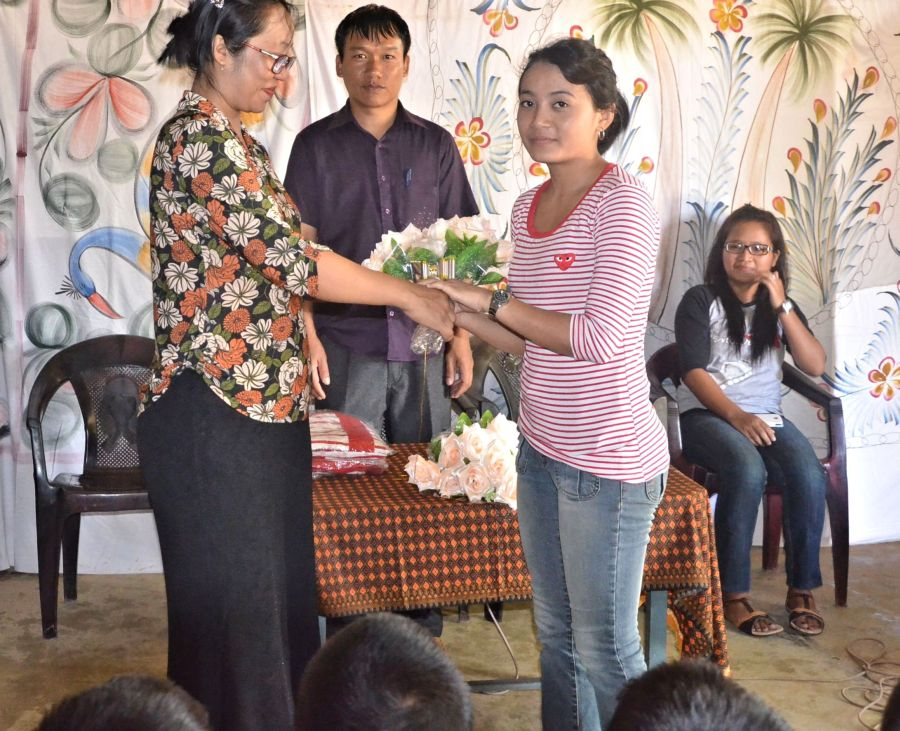
Nuchhungi English Medium School Hnahthial appreciation

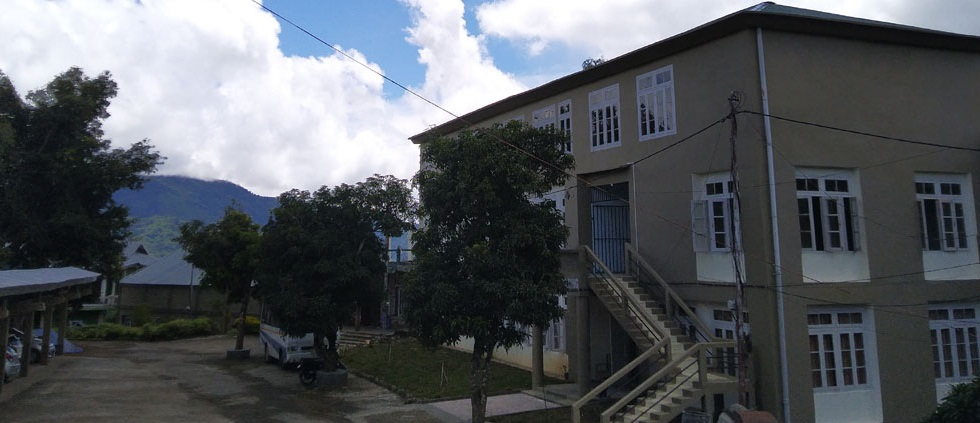
Hnahthial college

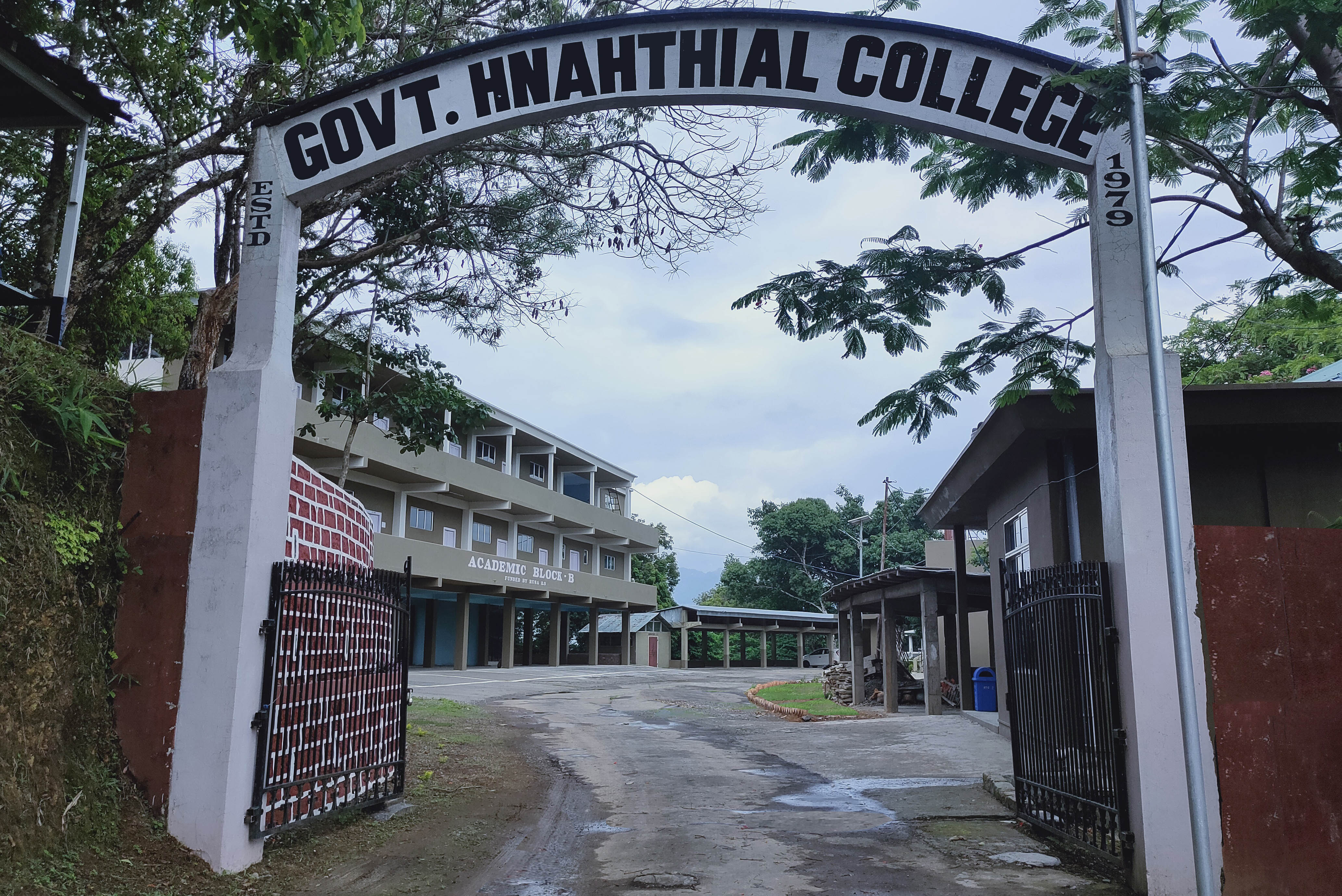
Hnahthial college main gate

There is one college, Hnahthial College, under Mizoram University and a number of public and private schools. Hnahthial has one government higher secondary school, two government high schools, three middle schools, six government primary schools and eight private schools.

The high schools run by the government of Mizoram are Government High School and Southern High School; middle schools run by the government of Mizoram are the Indira Memorial Middle School, Model Middle School and Government Middle School

Primary schools run by the government of Mizoram are named Primary School 1 through 6.

Elementary education is being administered by sub-divisional education officer.

The private schools are Nuchhungi English Medium School that won the first prize in Middle School section march past competition in 2020 in the first Republic Day celebration held in Hnahthial after Hnahthial district was made functional, Mantawni Memorial English School, Sapzari Memorial School, Moriah Public School, St. Stephen's School, FD Higher Secondary School, Presbyterian English School and Baptist English School.

== Transport ==
A helicopter service by Pawan Hans has been started which connects the Aizawl with Hnahthial. The distance between Hnahthial and Aizawl through NH 54 is 172 km and is connected by a bus and jeep/maxi cab service.

== Neighbourhoods ==
- Peniel Veng (Formerly Khawhri, Rotlang, Leite)
- Model Veng (Formerly Aithur)
- Chanmari Veng (Formerly Chawngtui)
- Lungleng Veng
- Venglai (Formerly Tarpho)
- Bazar Veng
- Kanaan Veng
- Electric Veng
- Electrict North

== Media ==
The major newspapers in Hnahthial are Huihchhuk, Rallang Weekly, Hnahthial Today, Hnahthial Times and Calathea.

There are two cable television networks - LD Cable Network and VL Vision.

== Notable residents ==
Notable former residents of Hnahthial include:

- Jeje Lalpekhlua – Indian footballer. He played more than fifty games for the Indian national team before his retirement.
- Isaac Vanmalsawma – Indian footballer. He appeared for different ISL clubs.

Notable current residents of Hnahthial include:

- K. Lalrinfela – Indian footballer. After playing for Aizawl FC in the 2022-23 and 2023-24 seasons and for Mohammedan SC in the 2024-25 season, he joined Odisha FC in 2025-26, where he continues to play. He is contracted to remain with Odisha through the 2027-28 season.
- Jeremy Laldinpuia – Indian footballer who has been playing for Mohammedan SC since 2024–25 season.
