= Mopin =

Agricultural festival celebrated by the Galo tribe

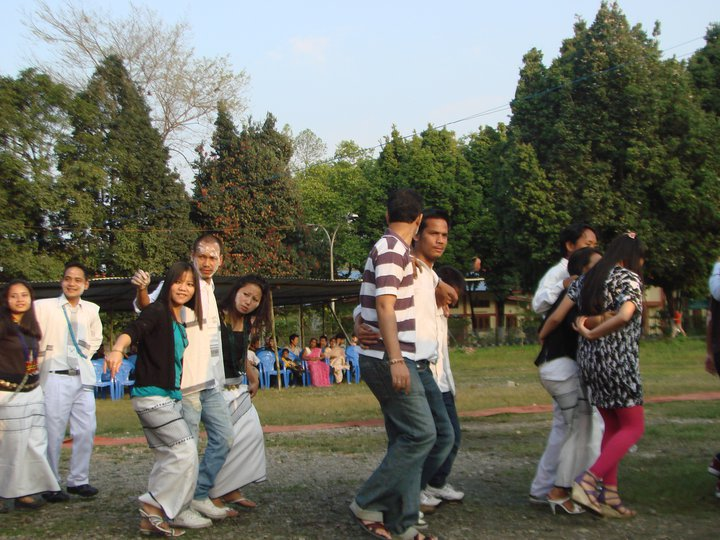
Mopin festival dance

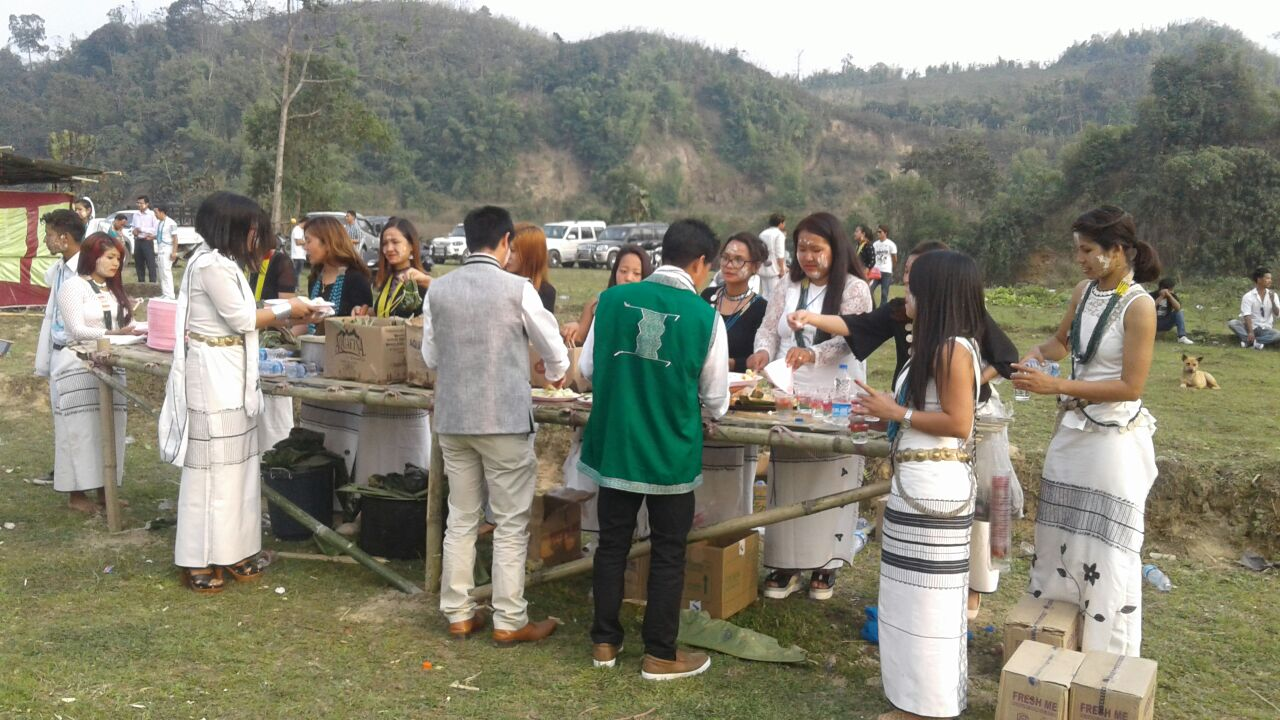
Himalayan University Mopin Festival Celebration 2017

The 'Mopin' or Moopin festival is an agricultural festival celebrated by the Galo tribe of Arunachal Pradesh, India in particular of the Galo group of tribes which resides in East Siang and West Siang districts. It is a celebration of the harvesting season held in the Galo months of "Lumi" and "Luki", corresponding to March–April and the new year for the Galo tribe. The Galo tribe follow an animist religion called Donyi-Polo.

Officially the date of the Mopin Festival is fixed on April 5, but the commencement of the preparation for celebration starts from 2 April and thus, after the main event (i.e. 5 April) it concludes on 7–8 April after the visiting of Paddy field which is known as RIGA ALO. In villages, the celebration starts a month prior.

The Mopin Festival is believed to bring wealth and prosperity to all households and to the whole community. The rituals associated with celebrating the Mopin festival drive away evil shadows and bringing blessings, peace and prosperity for all mankind.

The main Goddess worshiped during the festival is called Mopin Ane. She is as important to the Galos and is believed to bring in fertility and prosperity.

Galo people dress up in their finest white traditional clothing for the festival. A local drink called Apung/Poka (an alcoholic beverage popular in the state prepared by fermentation of rice) is generally distributed among the participants in a bamboo cup and a variety of meals are served, made of rice which is known as Aamin which contains meat and bamboo shoot.

Revelers apply Ette, a rice flour, to fellow revelers' faces. Since rice is the main staple food of the Galo people this is considered a holy ritual that symbolizes social unity, purity and love.

Participants perform a local traditional dance called Popir at this event. The main focal point of the Mopin celebration is the sacrifice of the Mithun (also known as Gayal), a bovine creature that is only found in North East India and Burma. After the sacrifice the blood of the mithun is taken back to the homes and villages as a blessing.

Since 1966 a committee has organized a Mopin festival event in the town of Along (as known as Aalo) in the West Siang district of Arunachal Pradesh which brings thousands of people together to celebrate and preserve the tribal culture. Mopin was held on April 5 in 2016. 2016 was the Golden Anniversary of this community Mopin celebration.
