= Khawzawl district =

- District of Mizoram
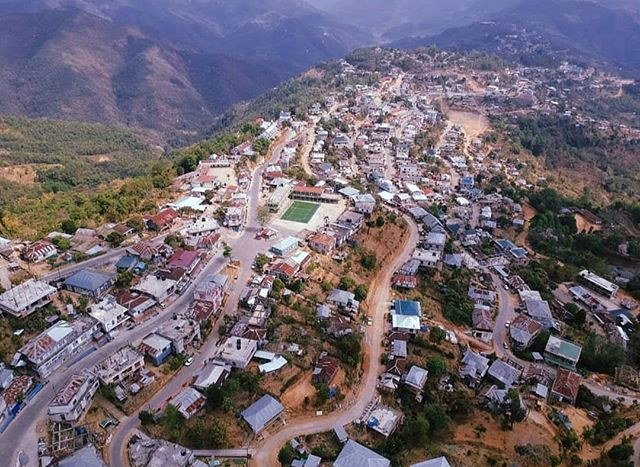
- Khawzawl
- Interactive map of Khawzawl district
- Coordinates (Khawzawl): 23.535°N 93.185°E
- Country: India
- State: Mizoram
- Headquarters: Khawzawl

Government
  - Lok Sabha constituencies: Mizoram

Demographics
- Time zone: UTC+05:30 (IST)
- Website: khawzawl.nic.in

Khawzawl district is one of the eleven districts of Mizoram state in India. It was created on 3 June 2019. The district headquarters is Khawzawl.

== Divisions ==
The district has four legislative assembly constituencies: Champhai North, Hrangturzo, Lengteng, and Tuichang. There are 28 inhabited towns and villages in this district. Khawzawl town itself has around 3,000 families residing in it, with an estimated total of around 14,000 people residing in Khawzawl town.

== Transport ==
The Distance between Khawzawl and Aizawl is 152 km. Khawzawl is connected with regular service of bus, sumo (passenger vehicle) and helicopter.
