= Chakmas of Arunachal Pradesh =

Ethnic group in India

Arunachali Chakma
𑄃𑄧𑄢𑄪𑄚𑄌𑄧𑄣𑄴 𑄇𑄪𑄣𑄴𑄣𑄳𑄠 𑄌𑄋𑄴𑄟𑄳𑄦
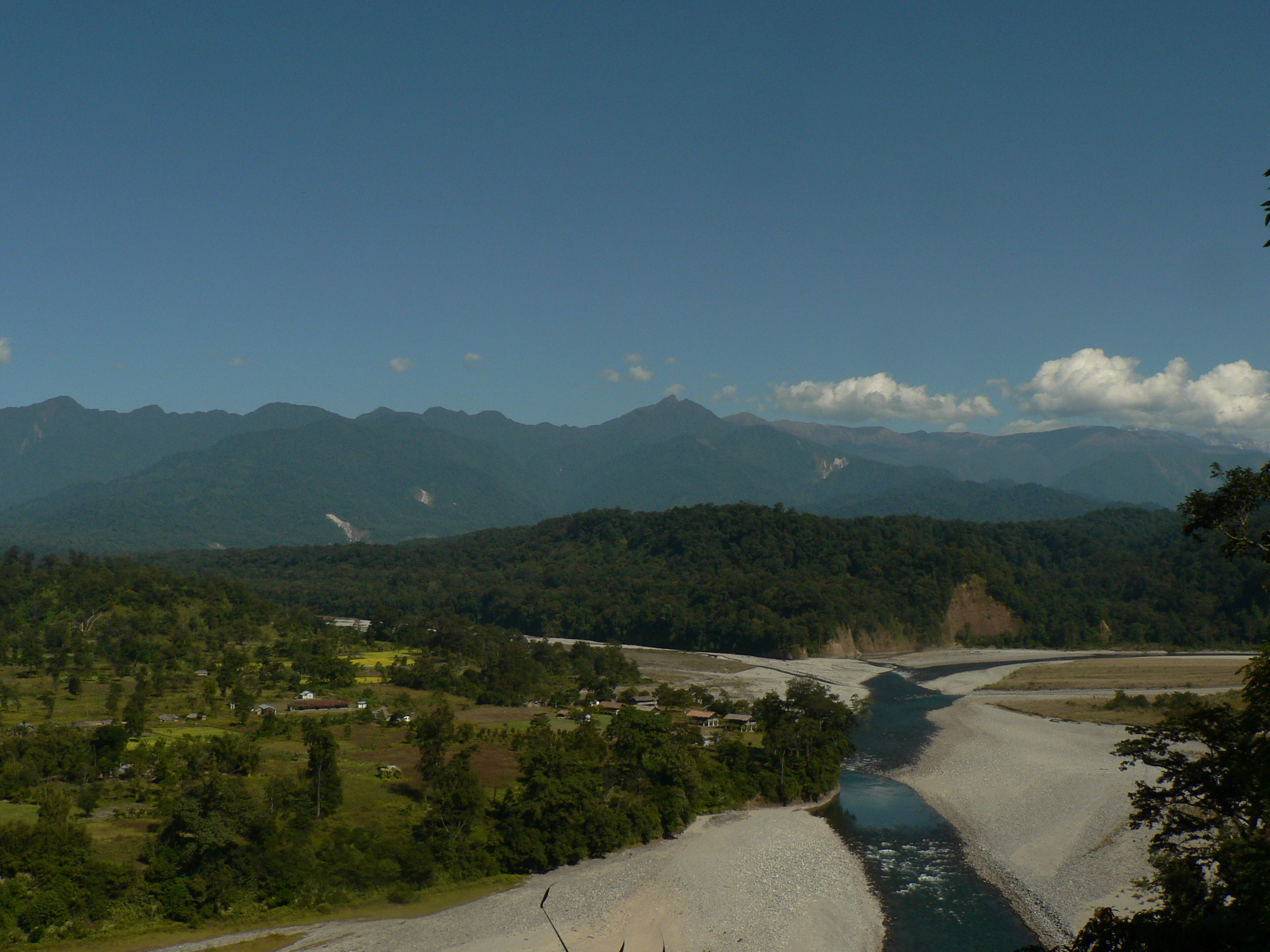
- A chakma village Deban, next to Namdapha National Park

Total population
- 47,073 (2011); 3.4% of the Arunachal Pradesh population

Regions with significant populations
- Changlang District: 40,225
  - Diyun: 23,072
  - Miao: 10,464
  - Bordumsa: 5,227
  - Kharsang: 1,442
- Namsai District: 4,789
  - Chongkham: 4,538
- Papum Pare District: 2,027
  - Balijan: 2,011

Languages
- Chakma language

Religion
- Predominantly: Theravada Buddhism 98.5% Minority: Christianity 1.5% (Note: According to Joshua Project’s state-level estimates for Arunachal Pradesh, there are approximately 700 Chakma people in Arunachal Pradesh who are Christians, which is about 1.5% of the total Chakma population in Arunachal Pradesh.)

Related ethnic groups
- Khamti people; Singpho people
- Nearly 100% of the chakmas who follow Buddhism follow the Theravada lineage with partially visible components from their folk tradition.

The Chakmas(Chakma: 𑄌𑄋𑄴𑄟𑄳𑄦, romanized: cangmha, Chakma pronunciation: [ˈtʃɑːkmə, 'tʃaŋmə]) in Arunachal Pradesh, India are primarily found in three districts: Changlang, Namsai and Papum Pare.

According to the 2011 census, there were 47,073 chakmas in Arunachal Pradesh equivalent to 3.4% of the total states' population.

== History ==
North East Frontier Agency (NEFA), now Arunachal Pradesh, like the Chittagong Hill Tracts from whence Chakma was traditionally administered as an excluded area with minimum interference. The British policy in this area was one of non-interference. Taking over the administration of this turbulent and wild country was not rewarding enough. Following independence, Nehru made little changes to NEFA's administrative policy, opting instead for a philosophy of Minimum Interference based on anthropologist and Nehru's adviser on tribal affairs Dr. Verrier Elwin's "A Philosophy for NEFA." Nehru had said,

I am not at all sure which is better way of living, the tribal or our own. In some respects I am quite certain there’s is better. Therefore, it is grossly presumptuous on our part to approach them with an air of superiority to tell them how to behave or what to do or not to do. There is no point in trying to make to them a second copy of ourselves.

The policy of Minimum Interference was designed to strike a balance between the two extreme positions of isolation of the tribal people of NEFA on the one hand and total unscientific assimilation of these tribal people with outside world on the other. NEFA was more of an administrative unit designation rather than a proper name for an important and integral portion of India with its own identity. The Chinese aggression drew the attention of the rest of the subcontinent in the region in 1962 and stunned the country's policymakers and prompting a significant shift in the India's administrative policy toward this area. Nehru's policy of “minimum interference” drew flak from the opposition parties. This policy was criticised as “Museum of Specimen Approach‟ and was blamed for non-integration of the area and non-assimilation of the tribal people with rest of the country, to fatal consequences. Nehru's government was cornered by the opposition and the NEFA was transferred from the Ministry of External Affairs to the Ministry of Home Affairs, the IFAS officers were merged with the IAS and the IPS, and the isolationist policy was reversed. People's political participation at all levels was widely believed to be the greatest method to integrate the region with the country.

=== Partition of India ===
Chakmas are the victim of the partition of India in 1947. The partition of India was determined by religious composition and population of different regions. The sparsely populated Chittagong Hill Tracts were a special case. Located on the eastern limits of Bengal, it provided the Muslim-majority Chittagong with a hinterland. Despite the Tracts' 98.5% Buddhist majority in 1947 the territory was given to Pakistan.

=== Settlement ===
The Chakmas now living in Arunachal Pradesh trace their arrival to displacement caused by the Kaptai Dam, built on the Karnaphuli River in the Chittagong Hill Tracts (CHT) of what was then East Pakistan, now Bangladesh. The dam's reservoir submerged a large share of the CHT's cultivable land from the early 1960s, displacing an estimated 100,000 people, most of them Chakma; many received no compensation, and the displacement coincided with the 1963 revocation of the CHT's protected status under Pakistani law. A smaller number of Hajongs, a Hindu community from the same region, left around the same time citing religious persecution.Roughly 14,000–15,000 of the displaced Chakmas and Hajongs crossed into India via Tripura and Mizoram and were moved through a series of relief camps, the last of which was at Ledo in Assam. Between 1964 and 1969, the Government of India, acting through the North East Frontier Agency (NEFA) administration, resettled them under a centrally sponsored rehabilitation plan in the Tirap, Lohit, and Subansiri frontier divisions of NEFA — present-day Changlang, Namsai, and Papum Pare districts of Arunachal Pradesh — following consultations between central officials and local tribal leaders. Some accounts also cite the 1962 Sino-Indian War as a factor in the decision to settle a population considered loyal to India along the sensitive frontier.By 1979, official figures put the settled population at roughly 3,900 families, or about 21,500 people. NEFA became a Union Territory in 1972, renamed Arunachal Pradesh, and attained full statehood in 1987. For the first two decades of their settlement, Chakmas held ration cards, trade licenses, and voting rights, and some served in paramilitary units, even though few had yet been formally granted citizenship.

== Citizenship status ==
Most Chakmas born in Arunachal Pradesh before 1 July 1987 are entitled to Indian citizenship by birth under Section 3 of the Citizenship Act, 1955 — a threshold an estimated 60,000 of the community's roughly 65,000–70,000 members are believed to meet — but the great majority have not had this entitlement formally processed by the state government.

=== NHRC v. State of Arunachal Pradesh (1996) ===
Rising hostility toward the community in the mid-1990s (see #Political relations and the All Arunachal Pradesh Students' Union) led the National Human Rights Commission to petition the Supreme Court of India under Article 32 in 1995. On 9 January 1996, a bench headed by Chief Justice A. M. Ahmadi held that the state had a constitutional duty under Article 21 to protect the life and liberty of the Chakmas — a protection the Court held extends to non-citizens — and directed the state government to prevent forcible eviction and process pending citizenship applications. The ruling is frequently cited in Indian constitutional law as authority for the proposition that Article 21 protections are not contingent on citizenship.

=== CCRCAP v. State of Arunachal Pradesh (2015) and subsequent enforcement ===
Implementation of the 1996 judgment stalled for two decades. Separately, a 2000 Delhi High Court ruling (W.P. No. 886 of 2000) held that roughly 90 per cent of the Chakmas and Hajongs were citizens by birth under Section 3 of the Citizenship Act, 1955, and directed the Election Commission of India to register eligible voters; by the mid-2000s only a small fraction of the community had actually been enrolled. A 2013 Gauhati High Court ruling further held that the Bengal Eastern Frontier Regulation of 1873 — the basis of Arunachal Pradesh's Inner Line Permit system — did not apply to Chakmas and Hajongs who had been permanently settled by the Union government.

The Committee for Citizenship Rights of the Chakmas of Arunachal Pradesh (CCRCAP) subsequently petitioned the Supreme Court seeking enforcement of the 1996 order. On 17 September 2015, a bench comprising Justices Anil R. Dave and Adarsh Kumar Goel again directed the Union and state governments to "finalise the conferment of citizenship rights on eligible Chakmas and Hajongs" within three months, and reiterated that the community could not be required to hold Inner Line Permits, since they were already permanently settled in the state. The Arunachal Pradesh government's review petition against the 2015 order was subsequently dismissed by the Supreme Court.

Despite these rulings, community organisations say not a single new citizenship application was processed by the state in the following years. In January 2022, following a complaint by the Chakma Development Foundation of India (CDFI), the NHRC again directed the Ministry of Home Affairs and the state government to protect the community's rights and report on compliance with the 1996 and 2015 orders.

=== Opposition and the Inner Line Permit question ===
The AAPSU and allied tribal organisations have consistently opposed granting citizenship, land rights or Scheduled Tribe status to the Chakmas and Hajongs, arguing that their numbers have grown substantially since 1964 and that formal recognition would alter the demographic balance and threaten the identity of Arunachal Pradesh's indigenous communities, who are protected under the state's Inner Line Permit regime and Article 371(H) of the Constitution. In September 2017, the AAPSU called a twelve-hour state-wide shutdown against a Union government move to grant the community "limited citizenship" without land rights or Scheduled Tribe status, during which protesters set fire to several vehicles.

In December 2021, the Arunachal Pradesh government, under pressure from an AAPSU ultimatum, moved to conduct a separate administrative census of the Chakma and Hajong population in Changlang district. Community bodies, including the CCRCAP and the CDFI, denounced the exercise as an act of "racial profiling" that violated the 1996 Supreme Court order's bar on coercive action against the community pending resolution of citizenship applications, and organised protests in Diyun and at Jantar Mantar in New Delhi.

=== Non-implementation and later litigation ===
Citizenship applications remained largely unprocessed in the years that followed. A 1997 Rajya Sabha committee report recommended expedited citizenship grants, and a 2000 Delhi High Court ruling found that approximately 90% of the community qualified as citizens by birth, directing the Election Commission of India to register eligible voters — after which only a few thousand of the community were in fact enrolled. A 2013 Gauhati High Court ruling held that the Bengal Eastern Frontier Regulation, 1873 (the basis of the state's Inner Line Permit regime) did not apply to the Chakmas once permitted to settle in the state.

The Committee for Citizenship Rights of the Chakmas of Arunachal Pradesh (CCRCAP), founded in 1991, filed a further petition seeking enforcement of the 1996 order. On 17 September 2015, the Supreme Court again directed the Union and state governments to process all pending citizenship applications within three months. As of the mid-2020s, this direction had also not been fully implemented, with the Chakma Development Foundation of India stating in a 2021 NHRC complaint that no application had been processed since the 2015 order.

=== Interaction with the Citizenship (Amendment) Act, 2019 ===
The Citizenship (Amendment) Act, 2019 created a fast-track path to citizenship for non-Muslim migrants — including Buddhists, covering most Chakmas, and Hindus, covering the Hajongs — from Bangladesh, Pakistan, and Afghanistan who entered India before 31 December 2014, but Arunachal Pradesh is excluded from the Act's application as an Inner Line Permit state. Union ministers have offered differing public positions on the resulting overlap: Union Law Minister Kiren Rijiju has stated Chakmas could obtain citizenship under the CAA but only if resettled outside Arunachal Pradesh, a position Chakma organisations dispute on the grounds that most were settled by the Indian state itself rather than being migrants requiring naturalisation.

== Political relations and the All Arunachal Pradesh Students' Union ==
Organised opposition to the Chakma and Hajong presence in Arunachal Pradesh has been led since the early 1980s primarily by the All Arunachal Pradesh Students' Union (AAPSU), the state's largest student body, which has functioned as a significant political pressure group in the state. AAPSU's stated position is that settlement of a large non-tribal population threatens the demographic balance and land rights of the state's indigenous communities, which are constitutionally protected under the Inner Line Permit regime; the union has argued the Chakmas and Hajongs, if eligible for citizenship, should be resettled outside the state rather than integrated within it.

Chakma and Hajong advocacy organisations — principally the Chakma Rights and Development Organisation (CRDO) and the Chakma Development Foundation of India (CDFI) — dispute this framing, characterising decades of AAPSU-led agitation as having mischaracterised a centrally sponsored resettlement as illegal migration, and arguing that no Arunachal Pradesh chief minister has sought to restrain the movement given its political influence in the state.

=== 1994–95 blockade ===
The dispute reached a documented crisis in 1994, when AAPSU issued "quit notices" giving Chakmas and Hajongs until 30 September 1995 to leave the state. The Supreme Court found in its 1996 judgment that AAPSU had subsequently enforced an economic blockade of the settlement areas that disrupted the supply of food, medicine, and other essentials, that Chakmas died during this period for want of medicine, and that state officials had in some instances acted in coordination with the agitation rather than against it, despite the state government's denials.

=== 2021 relocation controversy ===
On 15 August 2021, Chief Minister Pema Khandu announced that "illegal immigrant" Chakmas would be relocated out of Arunachal Pradesh, a position echoed by Union Law Minister Kiren Rijiju, who described Chakmas as "guests" not entitled to permanent residency. The announcement followed a state-ordered "special census" of Chakma-populated areas, which the CDFI and allied organisations characterised as unconstitutional racial profiling and asked the NHRC to halt. Assam Chief Minister Himanta Biswa Sarma later denied any inter-state agreement to receive relocated Chakmas.

=== Residential Proof Certificate dispute ===
In July 2022, the state government suspended issuance of Residential Proof Certificates (RPCs) to Chakmas and Hajongs following AAPSU pressure, after it emerged that the Diyun Extra Assistant Commissioner's office had issued several hundred such certificates. Chakma organisations protested the suspension as a continuation of discriminatory treatment; AAPSU maintained the certificates amounted to unauthorised documentation of "illegal migrants."

=== 2025 referendum ===
In September 2025, an estimated 8,000 Chakma and Hajong residents of Diyun took part in a community-organised referendum calling for a permanent resolution of their citizenship status. (Note: This referendum was widely covered by regional broadcasters; a text-based reliable source should be substituted or added if available.)

=== 2026 electoral-roll violence in Bordumsa ===
Tensions escalated in September 2026 during the Election Commission of India's Special Intensive Revision (SIR) of electoral rolls, when hearings on claims and objections in Bordumsa, Changlang district, were disrupted over several days by AAPSU-affiliated protesters objecting to the inclusion of Chakma and Hajong voters. The All India Chakma Students' Union called on residents to remain peaceful and cooperate with the statutory process, while the Chakma Development Foundation of India sought NHRC intervention, alleging Chakma electors had been prevented from attending the hearing. Responsibility for the violence, including competing claims about who fired shots, remained unverified by independent sources as of early September 2026.

== Allegations of hardship and discrimination ==
Chakma and Hajong residents and advocacy organisations have documented a broader pattern of administrative restriction in the decades since Arunachal Pradesh's 1987 statehood, including periodic denial or suspension of ration cards, trade licenses, birth certificate issuance, and school admissions in Chakma-majority areas. The community's settlements, largely built along low-lying riverbanks in Diyun, Bordumsa, Miao, Chongkham, and Kokila, have also faced recurring monsoon flooding, compounding poverty that surveys have described as leaving much of the population below the poverty line with limited government development schemes directed toward it.

Violence against individual Chakmas outside Arunachal Pradesh has separately drawn national attention to the community's broader vulnerability: in December 2025, a Chakma man, Anjel Chakma, died after being stabbed in an apparently racially motivated attack in Dehradun, Uttarakhand, prompting the formation of a Special Investigation Team and nationwide protests.

== Current status ==
As of 2026, the Chakma and Hajong citizenship question in Arunachal Pradesh remains formally unresolved despite two Supreme Court rulings, in 1996 and 2015, directing the processing of citizenship applications. The community continues to seek implementation of those orders, while AAPSU and allied organisations continue to press for relocation outside the state, and the dispute continues to surface periodically around electoral processes and state policy announcements.

== Education ==
=== Literacy rates of villages ===
| Village | Circle | Literacy % (2011) | Population | |
| Village | Circle | Literacy % (2011) | Literate | Total |
|---|---|---|---|---|
| Avoipur | Diyun | 48.85% | 962 | 1,969 |
| Diyun H.Q. | Diyun | 86.76% | 1,553 | 1,790 |
| Dumpani | Diyun | 55.45% | 1,281 | 2,311 |
| Dumpather | Diyun | 53.45% | 1,142 | 2,136 |
| Gautompur | Diyun | 31.32% | 760 | 2,426 |
| Jyotipur | Diyun | 54.89% | 1,188 | 2,164 |
| Jyotsnapur | Diyun | 46.06% | 1,108 | 2,407 |
| Kamakhyapur | Diyun | 46.55% | 320 | 688 |
| Maitripur | Diyun | 45.7% | 968 | 2,117 |
| Mudoidip | Diyun | 29.07% | 613 | 2,109 |
| Rajanagar | Diyun | 63.51% | 260 | 410 |
| Shantipur | Diyun | 50.8% | 450 | 886 |
| Udoipur | Diyun | 39.92% | 1,279 | 3,203 |

== Culture ==
The Chakmas of Arunachal Pradesh share the broader culture of the Chakma people, which they carried with them from the Chittagong Hill Tracts; community and administrative sources describe the same dress, festivals, music and food across Chakma populations in India and Bangladesh.

=== Traditional attire and ornaments ===
Chakma women's everyday and ceremonial dress consists of the pinon, an ankle-length wrapped skirt, and the hadi (also khadi), a cloth worn over the upper body. A pinon is distinguished by a patterned band (saabugih) running along its length; without it the cloth is not considered a pinon. Women weave these garments on a backstrap loom called the bein (the set of loom parts is collectively the sozpodor), using cotton that is spun and dyed with root- and plant-based dyes. Weavers first work patterns, known as aalam, onto a reference cloth and then recombine them in new garments. Chakma women are widely regarded as the principal custodians of this weaving tradition, which persists in daily use alongside modern clothing. During Bizu, women wear the pinon and hadi while men wear the silum and dhudi.

Traditional ornaments are made of silver, and community accounts also mention ivory, bronze and gold.

=== Festivals, dance and music ===
Bizu, the three-day Chakma New Year in mid-April, is the community's most important socio-religious festival. It begins with Phool Bizu, when flowers are offered to the Buddha, and continues with Mul Bizu, the main day, which opens with ritual bathing. The festival gave rise to the Bizu dance, a group dance in square or circular formation marked by abrupt pauses and accompanied by flutes and drums. A state-level Bizumela of dance performances was held at Avoipur village, Diyun, in 2014.

Traditional music includes ubo geet (love songs) and genghuli, long ballads sung by specialist singers that recount Chakma history and legend; a performance can last from evening until dawn. Instruments include the hengorong (a bamboo instrument), dhuduk and singha, alongside bamboo flutes.

=== Cuisine ===
Chakma cooking relies on steaming, boiling and cooking in bamboo, and on ingredients such as bamboo shoots, hill chillies, dried fish and jhum-grown vegetables. Pajon, a curry of many mixed vegetables cooked with dried fish, is the signature Bizu dish; cooks traditionally use twenty or more vegetables. Other dishes include bachchuri (stuffed bamboo shoots) and bini hoga pitha, a steamed cake of glutinous bini rice with coconut and banana. Hebang refers to the method of steaming food in bamboo, banana leaf or a pan.

=== Language ===
The Chakma language (Changma Vaj) is an Indo-Aryan language, although the Chakma are ethnically linked to Tibeto-Burman-speaking groups. It has its own script, the Ojhapath, but a linguistic study of Arunachal Pradesh reports that Chakmas there mostly write in the Bengali script, that Chakma is not used for mother-tongue education in the state, and classes it as a definitely endangered language.

=== Religion ===
The great majority of Chakmas in Arunachal Pradesh follow Theravada Buddhism. The Bana Vihar at Jyotsnapur, Diyun, is described as the largest Chakma Buddhist monastery complex in the state. Its annual Kathina Civara Dana (robe-offering ceremony) draws thousands of lay Chakmas and invited monks from other Theravada countries. Buddha Purnima, on the full-moon day of Vaisakh, marks the Buddha's birth, enlightenment and death; on this day Chakmas visit the temple, offer flowers, light candles and give alms to monks.

Religious makeup of Arunachali Chakmas
| Buddhism | 98.5% |
| Theravada | 98.0% |
| Vajrayana, Mahayana | 0.5% |
| Christianity | 1.5% |
| Protestants | 1.5% |

Chakmas in Arunachal Pradesh predominantly follow Theravada lineage of Buddhism.. Buddhist organisations enjoy strong hold in the society. They actively participate in decision making and tend to influence believes over the community. Chakmas in Arunachal Pradesh have been keen in practising non-violence influenced by Buddhist missionaries from Chittagong Hill Tracts and Thailand.

There are about 700-1000(about 1.5-2.5%) Chakmas in Arunachal Pradesh who follow Christianity. Christians among the Chakmas mostly reside in Deban, Kamakhyapur and Gautompur.

== Economy ==
After resettlement in the 1960s, Chakmas in Arunachal Pradesh lived mainly by agriculture on plots allotted by the state. Farming in the state combines shifting (jhum) and settled cultivation, with settled wet-rice and fish farming promoted in valleys. The Chakma heartland, Changlang district, is an emerging horticulture belt; its organically grown areca nut is marketed to Delhi, Maharashtra, Rajasthan and Lucknow, with support from the central government, NABARD and the NGO NEICORD.

Women's handloom weaving supplies garments for community use and, increasingly, for sale. Settlements on low-lying riverbanks are prone to monsoon flooding, and surveys describe much of the population as living below the poverty line with limited access to state development schemes.

Chakmas are engaged vastly in Areca Nut plantations. In the last few decades Chakmas moved from agriculture to Areca Nut plantations. Regions like Diyun in Arunachal Pradesh vastly export Areca Nut to the other parts of the country.

== Geographic distribution ==
| District | Sub-district | Ethnic Chakmas | | % | | Ref(s) |
| District | Sub-district | Sub-district | District | Sub-district | District | Ref(s) |
|---|---|---|---|---|---|---|
| Changlang | Diyun | 23,072 | 40,225 | 72.1% | 27.1% | |
| Changlang | Miao | 10,464 | 40,225 | 40.4% | 27.1% | |
| Changlang | Bordumsa | 5,227 | 40,225 | 18% | 27.1% | |
| Changlang | Kharsang | 1,442 | 40,225 | 10% | 27.1% | |
| Namsai | Chongkham | 4,538 | 4,728 | 20.6% | 5% | |
| Namsai | Piyong | 173 | 4,728 | 1.7% | 5% | |
| Papum Pare | Balijan | 2,011 | 2027 | 30.1% | 1.1% | |

=== Villages & Communities ===
==== East ====
- Changlang District
  - Diyun Sub-district
    - Avoipur
    - Aytmorasora
    - Deboblock
    - Diyun Headquarter
    - Dumpani
    - Dumpather
    - Gautompur
    - Jyotipur
    - Jyotsnapur
    - Kamakhyapur
    - Maitripur
    - Manabhum Headquarter
    - Mudoi Deep
    - Muddhokonala
    - Rajanagar
    - Shantipur
    - Shillong Pahar
    - Sukhanala
    - Udoipur
  - Bordumsa Sub-district
    - Bijoypur - I
    - Bijoypur - II
    - Bijoypur - III
  - Miao Sub-district
    - Anandpur
    - Brajapur
    - Budhisatta
    - Deban
    - Devapuri
    - Dharmapur
    - Kamalpuri
    - M'Pen - I
    - M'Pen - II
    - Punniyabhumi
  - Kharsang Sub-district
    - Golokpur
    - Milonpur
    - Ratnapur
- Namsai District
  - Chongkham Sub-district
    - Chakma - I
    - Chakma - II
    - Chakma - III

==== West ====
- Papum Pare District
  - Balijan Sub-district
    - Chakma - I
    - Chakma - II
    - Chakma - III
    - Chakma - IV
    - Chakma - V
    - Chakma - VI
    - Chakma - VII
    - Chakma - VIII
    - Chakma - IX
    - Chakma - X

== Bibliography ==
- National Human Rights Commission v. State of Arunachal Pradesh & Anr, 1996 AIR 1234, 1996 SCC (1) 742 (Supreme Court of India, 9 January 1996).
