= Private attorney general =

Informal term for public interest lawyer

A private attorney general or public interest lawyer is an informal term originating in common law jurisdictions for a private attorney who brings a lawsuit claiming it to be in the public interest, i.e., benefiting the general public and not just the plaintiff, on behalf of a citizen or group of citizens. The attorney may, at the equitable discretion of the court, be entitled to recover attorney's fees if they prevail. The rationale behind this principle is to provide extra incentive to private attorneys to pursue suits that may be of benefit to society at large. Private attorney general suits are commonly, though not always, brought as class actions in jurisdictions that permit the certification of class action lawsuits.

== Origin ==
Historically in English common law, a writ of qui tam was a writ through which private individuals who assist a prosecution can receive for themselves all or part of the damages or financial penalties recovered by the government as a result of the prosecution. Its name is an abbreviation of the Latin phrase qui tam pro domino rege quam pro se ipso in hac parte sequitur, meaning "[he] who sues in this matter for the king as well as for himself." While the writ fell into disuse in England and Wales following the Common Informers Act 1951, it remains current in the United States under the False Claims Act, 31 U.S.C. § 3729 et seq., which allows a private individual, or "whistleblower" (or relator), with knowledge of past or present fraud committed against the federal government to bring suit on its behalf. This allowance and, in some cases, reliance on private individual litigation to enforce the law has also been referred to as a "bounty" system due to the private citizen's potential financial gain if the suit is successful. There are also qui tam provisions in 18 U.S.C. § 962 regarding arming vessels against friendly nations; 25 U.S.C. § 201 regarding violating Indian protection laws; 46 U.S.C. § 80103 regarding the removal of undersea treasure from the Florida coast to foreign nations; and 35 U.S.C. § 292 regarding false marking. However, in February 2011, the qui tam provision regarding false marking was held to be unconstitutional by a U.S. District Court, and, in September of that year, the enactment of the Leahy–Smith America Invents Act effectively removed qui tam remedies from § 292. Contemporary private attorney general lawsuits are an outgrowth of the rationale underlying the writ of qui tam that enabling private citizens to enforce the law will strengthen enforcement and contribute to the rule of law.

== India ==
Non-governmental organisations and activists in India acting as private attorneys general routinely undertake litigation to secure public interest and demonstrates the availability of justice to socially-disadvantaged parties and was introduced by Justice P. N. Bhagwati. Traditionally, Indian courts applied the English doctrine of locus standi, permitting litigation only from parties affected directly or indirectly by the defendant. However, by the end of the twentieth century, the Supreme Court and the country's various high courts began permitting cases on the grounds of public interest litigation, permitting civil society actors to file litigation aimed at enforcing civil and consumer rights. Litigation brought in this manner by private citizens led to the development in Indian tort law of absolute liability for enterprises engaging in hazardous activities that subsequently caused harm to any individual or community or to their property under the rule in M. C. Mehta v. Union of India.

=== Historical cases ===
One of the earliest public interest litigation was filed by G. Vasantha Pai who filed a case in the Madras High Court against the then sitting Chief Justice of the Madras High court S. Ramachandra Iyer after it was found the judge had forged his date of birth to avoid compulsory retirement at the age of 60 and his younger brother sent invitations to celebrate his 60th birthday and Pai found evidence after photographing his original birth register which showed his real age.Ramachandra Iyer resigned on a request from the then Chief Justice of India P. B. Gajendragadkar as the case would damage the judiciary and he resigned before the case came up for hearing this led the case to be dismissed as he had resigned.

In December 1979, Kapila Hingorani filed a petition in regards to the condition of the prisoners detained in the Bihar jail, whose suits were pending in court. The petition was signed by prisoners of the Bihar jail and the case was filed in the Supreme Court of India before the bench headed by Justice P. N. Bhagwati. The petition was filed under the name of a prisoner, Hussainara Khatoon, and the case was therefore named Hussainara Khatoon Vs State of Bihar. The Supreme Court decided that prisoners should receive free legal aid and fast hearings. As a result, 40,000 prisoners were released from jail. Thereafter many similar cases have been registered in the Supreme Court. It was in the case of SP Gupta vs Union of India that the Supreme Court of India defined the term "public interest litigation" in the Indian context.

In Vishaka v State of Rajasthan, the plaintiff fought against sexual harassment in the workplace and was filed by Bhanwari Devi, who, after trying to stop the marriage of a one-year-old girl in rural Rajasthan, was raped by five men. She faced numerous problems when she (Devi) attempted to seek justice. Naina Kapoor decided to initiate a PIL to challenge sexual harassment at workplace in the Supreme Courts. The judgement of the case recognised sexual harassment as a violation of the fundamental constitutional rights of Articles 14, 15, and 21. The guidelines also directed for sexual harassment prevention.

== United States ==
In the United States, many civil rights statutes rely on private attorneys general for their enforcement. In Newman v. Piggie Park Enterprises, one of the earliest cases construing the Civil Rights Act of 1964, the United States Supreme Court ruled that "A public accommodations suit is thus private in form only. When a plaintiff brings an action … he cannot recover damages. If he obtains an injunction, he does so not for himself alone but also as a 'private attorney general,' vindicating a policy that Congress considered of the highest priority." The United States Congress has also passed laws with "private attorney general" provisions that provide for the enforcement of laws prohibiting employment discrimination, police brutality, and water pollution. Under the Clean Water Act, for example, "any citizen" may bring suit against an individual or a company that is a source of water pollution.

Another example of the "private attorney general" provisions is the Racketeer Influenced and Corrupt Organizations Act (RICO). RICO allows average citizens (private attorneys general) to sue organisations that commit mail and wire fraud as part of their criminal enterprise. To date, there are over 60 federal statutes that encourage private enforcement by allowing prevailing plaintiffs to collect attorney's fees.

Attorneys who function as a private attorney general do so without compensation. The statutes permitting a plaintiff to recover attorneys' fees have been held not to apply when the plaintiff is an attorney.

President Clinton sought to find common ground between liberals who support stronger enforcement of civil rights and consumer protection law and conservatives sceptical of expensive government regulation, stating in his second State of the Union Address "That it was time for the American People to be given more power while the Federal Government down sizes" One approach to compromise that rose to prominence was providing for private citizens to act as "private attorneys general" for the enforcement of civil rights law, thereby delegating both the task and the financial burden of regulation to civil society. One instance of the use of "private attorney general" is in environmental activism and the enforcement of civil rights legislation protecting racial and ethnic minorities, where the role of private lawyers and organisations has generally been welcomed by federal authorities. For instance, in the case "Chester Residents Concerned for Quality Living v Seif", the federal government filed an amicus brief arguing that the regulations of Title VI of the Civil Rights Act of 1964 can be enforced by private attorneys general Correspondingly, the Supreme Court has determined that Congress intended several civil rights statutes to be enforceable by private parties

The U.S. Congress codified the private attorney general principle into law with the enactment of Civil Rights Attorney's Fees Award Act of 1976, 42 U.S.C. § 1988. The Senate Report on this statute stated that The Senate Committee on the Judiciary wanted to level the playing field so that private citizens, who might have little or no money, could still serve as "private attorneys general" and afford to bring actions, even against state or local bodies, to enforce the civil rights laws. The Committee acknowledged that, "[i]f private citizens are to be able to assert their civil rights, and if those who violate the Nation's fundamental laws are not to proceed with impunity, then citizens must have the opportunity to recover what it costs them to vindicate these rights in court." Where a plaintiff wins his or her lawsuit and is considered the "prevailing party," § 1988 acts to shift fees, including expert witness fees at least in certain types of civil rights actions, under the Civil Rights Act of 1991, even if not in § 1983 actions, and to make those who acted as private attorneys general whole again, thus encouraging the enforcement of the civil rights laws. The Senate reported that it intended fee awards to be "adequate to attract competent counsel" to represent client with civil rights grievances. S. Rep. No. 94-1011, p. 6 (1976). The U.S. Supreme Court has interpreted the act to provide for the payment of a "reasonable attorney's fee" based on the fair market value of the legal services.

While there is such a thing as a private attorney general act in the United States, it should be stated that there is no such thing as a private non-attorney citizen being a "private attorney general" for all purposes. The term applies only to the exercise of one's ability to pursue certain specific kinds of legal actions which are statutorily authorized. It does not create the ability to call one's self a "private attorney general".

== Criticism ==
In the area of product liability and consumer protection law, advocates of tort reform criticise private attorney general suits as attempts at regulation through litigation, the idea that litigation is being used to achieve regulatory ends that advocates would not be able to achieve through the democratic process. Private attorney general suits in America are frequently criticised as examples of regulation through litigation. (Note: For example, Rep. Rick Boucher (D-VA) argued in support of a 2005 federal tort reform that gave immunity to gun manufacturers in certain lawsuits because such lawsuits were "nothing more than thinly veiled attempts to circumvent the legislative process and achieve gun control through litigation"; reform supporters complained that (and the Pentagon supported the bill on the grounds that) the plaintiffs were trying to "sue [gun manufacturers] out of existence" by forcing them to incur $250 million in legal defence expenses, while gun control supporters argued that the legislation took "away the right of victims to be able to have their day in court," that the bill gave unprecedented immunity to a single industry, and claimed that the law was unconstitutional.) Similarly, public interest litigation in India has been criticised for undermining parliamentary sovereignty and enabling the court system to exert inordinate power over the legislative and executive branches of government. For instance, the emergence of constitutional torts has been criticised as an undemocratic example of judicial activism. Controversy further arose when judges began to read such obligations of the state into Article 21 of the Indian Constitution. However, opponents of tort reform assert that public interest litigation in India has served to secure "social and distributive justice." In law and economics literature, there is consequently a debate as to whether liability and regulation are substitutes or complements and thus whether the enforcement of predictable regulation known to manufacturers in advance can adequately assure consumer safety while providing greater legal certainty for manufacturers than strict liability

Another criticism of private attorney general suits in common law jurisdictions is that the availability of discovery enables private attorneys general to impose costs on defendants in order to force settlements in unmeritorious cases to avoid the cost of discovery. Similarly, legal commentators in civil law jurisdictions argue that broad discovery in the hands of private parties is destructive of the rule of law and amounts to "a private inquisition." Civil law countries see the underlying objectives of discovery as properly monopolised by the state in order to maintain the rule of law: the investigative objective of discovery is the prerogative of the executive branch, and insofar as discovery may be able to facilitate the creation of new rights, that is the prerogative of the legislative branch.

The principle underlying private attorney general lawsuits and the traditional writ of qui tam stands in contrast to the doctrine of parens patriae, under which the government is best placed to protect citizens from harmful conduct in its capacity as the "parent of the nation".

== See also ==
- Attorney general
- Cause lawyer
- Public interest law
