= Public interest litigation in India =

Litigation undertaken for the general good

The chief instrument through which judicial activism has flourished in India is public interest litigation (PIL) or social action litigation (SAL). It refers to litigation undertaken to secure public interest and demonstrates the availability of justice to socially-disadvantaged parties and was introduced by Justice P. N. Bhagwati and Justice V.R. Krishna Iyer. It is a relaxation on the traditional rule of locus standi. Before 1980s the judiciary and the Supreme Court of India entertained litigation only from parties affected directly or indirectly by the defendant. It heard and decided cases only under its original and appellate jurisdictions. However, the Supreme Court began permitting cases on the grounds of public interest litigation, which means that even people who are not directly involved in the case may bring matters of public interest to the court. It is the court's privilege to entertain the application for the PIL.

== History ==
One of the earliest public interest litigation was filed by G. Vasantha Pai who filed a case in the Madras High Court against the then sitting Chief Justice of the Madras High court S. Ramachandra Iyer after it was found the judge had forged his date of birth to avoid compulsory retirement at the age of 60. His younger brother sent invitations to celebrate his 60th birthday, and Pai found evidence after photographing his original birth register which showed his real age which was 64. Ramachandra Iyer resigned on a request from the then Chief Justice of India P. B. Gajendragadkar as the case would damage the judiciary and he had resigned before the case came up for hearing this led the case to be dismissed as he had resigned.

In December 1979, Kapila Hingorani filed a petition in regards to the condition of the prisoners detained in the Bihar jail, whose suits were pending in court. The petition was signed by prisoners of the Bihar jail and the case was filed in the Supreme Court of India before the bench headed by Justice P. N. Bhagwati. The petition was filed under the name of a prisoner, Hussainara Khatoon, and the case was therefore named Hussainara Khatoon Vs State of Bihar. The Supreme Court decided that prisoners should receive free legal aid and fast hearings. As a result, 40,000 prisoners were released from jail. Thereafter many similar cases have been registered in the Supreme Court. It was in the case of SP Gupta vs Union of India that the Supreme Court of India defined the term "public interest litigation" in the Indian context.

The concept of public interest litigation (PIL) is suited to the principles enshrined in Article 39A (Note: See Constitution of India/Part IV (WikiSource) for more details.) of the Constitution of India to protect and deliver prompt social justice with the help of law. Before the 1980s, only the aggrieved party could approach the courts for justice. After the emergency era the high court reached out to the people and devised a means for any person of the public (or NGO) approaching the court to seek legal remedy in cases where public interest is at stake. Bhagwati and Justice V. R. Krishna Iyer were among the first judges to admit PILs in court. Filing a PIL is not as cumbersome as a usual legal case; there have been instances when letters and telegrams addressed to the court have been heard as PILs.

The Supreme Court entertained a letter from two professors at the University of Delhi; it requested the enforcement of the constitutional right of inmates at a protective home in Agra who lived in inhuman and degrading conditions. In Miss Veena Sethi v. State of Bihar, 1982 (2) SCC 583 : 1982 SCC (Cri) 511 : AIR 1983 SC 339, the court treated a letter addressed to a judge of the court by the Free Legal Aid Committee in Hazaribagh, Bihar as a writ petition. In Citizens for Democracy through its President v. State of Assam and Others, 1995 KHC 486 : 1995 (2) KLT SN 74 : 1995 (3) SCC 743 : 1995 SCC (Cri) 600 : AIR 1996 SC 2193, the court entertained a letter from Shri Kuldip Nayar (a journalist, in his capacity as President of Citizens for Democracy) to a judge of the court alleging human rights violations of Terrorist and Disruptive Activities (Prevention) Act (TADA) detainees; it was treated as a petition under Article 32 of the Constitution of India.

== Frivolous PILs not permitted ==
PIL is a rule of law declared by the courts of record. However, the person (or entity) filing the petition must prove to the satisfaction of the court that the petition serves the public interest and is not as a frivolous lawsuit brought for monetary gain. The 38th Chief Justice of India, S. H. Kapadia, has stated that substantial "fines" would be imposed on litigants filing frivolous PILs. His statement was widely praised because the incidence of frivolous PILs for monetary interest were on the rise. A bench of the high court had also expressed concern over the misuse of PILs. The bench issued a set of guidelines it wanted all courts in the country to observe when entertaining PILs.

In a September 2008 speech, Prime Minister Manmohan Singh expressed concern over the misuse of PILs: “Many would argue that like in so many things in public life, in PILs too we may have gone too far. Perhaps a corrective was required and we have had some balance restored in recent times”. In what may be a tool against frivolous PILs, the Union Ministry of Law and Justice (assisted by Bhagwati and Iyer) prepared a law regulating PILs.

The judgment said: “This court wants to make it clear that an action at law is not a game of chess. A litigant who approaches the court must come with clean hands. He cannot prevaricate and take inconsistent positions”. For example, a petition drafted by Amar Singh was vague, not in conformance with the rules of procedure, and contained inconsistencies; the court did not explore his primary grievance (infringement of privacy). A positive outcome of the case was the court's request that the government “frame certain statutory guidelines to prevent interception of telephone conversation on unauthorised requests”. In this case, Reliance Communications acted upon a forged request from police.

In Kalyaneshwari vs Union of India, the court cited the misuse of public-interest litigation in business conflicts. A writ petition was filed in the Gujarat High Court seeking the closure of asbestos units, stating that the material was harmful to humans. The high court dismissed the petition, stating that it was filed at the behest of rival industrial groups who wanted to promote their products as asbestos substitutes. A similar petition was then submitted to the Supreme Court. The plea was dismissed, and the plaintiff was assessed a fine of ₹100,000. The judgment read: “The petition lacks bona fide and in fact was instituted at the behest of a rival industrial group, which was interested in banning of [sic] the activity of mining and manufacturing of asbestos. A definite attempt was made by it to secure a ban on these activities with the ultimate intention of increasing the demand of cast and ductile iron products as they are some of the suitable substitute for asbestos. Thus it was litigation initiated with ulterior motive of causing industrial imbalance and financial loss to the industry of asbestos through the process of court”. The court stated that it was its duty in such circumstances to punish the petitioners under the Contempt of Courts Act; it must “ensure that such unscrupulous and undesirable public interest litigation be not instituted in courts of law so as to waste the valuable time of the courts as well as preserve the faith of the public in the justice delivery system”.

“By now it ought to be plain and obvious that this Court does not approve of an approach that would encourage petitions filed for achieving oblique motives on the basis of wild and reckless allegations made by individuals, i.e., busybodies', a bench of Justices B. Sudershan Reddy and S. S. Nijjar observed in their judgment. The bench overturned an April 2010 Andhra Pradesh High Court decision which set aside the services of a retired Indian Police Service (IPS) officer employed by the Tirumala Venkateswara Temple. The high court’s decision concerned a public-interest petition filed by S. Mangati Gopal Reddy, who alleged in court that the former IPS officer was involved in the loss of “300 gold dollars” from the temple and should not continue in office. The Supreme Court found that the high court decided against the accused with little information about Reddy himself.

=== Importance ===
Public interest litigation gives a wider description to the right to equality, life and personality, which is guaranteed under part III of the Constitution of India. It also functions as an effective instrument for changes in the society or social welfare. Through public interest litigation, any public or person can seek remedy on behalf of the oppressed class by introducing a PIL.

The PIL concept deviates from the traditional adversarial justice system that is followed in the common law countries (past colonies of the UK), and this construct is in fact inquisitorial in nature which permits the judges to directly participate in the investigation of the case.

=== Parties against whom PILs can be filed ===
A PIL may be filed against state government, central government, municipal authority. Also, private person may be included in PIL as ‘Respondent’, after concerned of state authority. i.e. a private factory in Mumbai which is causing pollution then public interest litigation can be filed against government of Mumbai, state pollution central board including that private factory of Mumbai.

=== Filing a PIL under article 32, 226 Constitution of India or section 133 Cr. P. C. ===
The court must be satisfied that the Writ petition fulfills some basic needs for PIL as the letter is addressed by the aggrieved person, public spirited individual and a social action group for the enforcement of legal or Constitutional rights to any person who are not able to approach the court for redress. Any citizen can file a public case by filing a petition:

- Under Art 32 of the Indian Constitution, in the Supreme Court.
- Under Art 226 of the Indian Constitution, in the High Court.
- Under sec. 133 of the Criminal Procedure Code, in a magistrate's court.

=== Landmark PIL cases ===
==== Vishaka v. State of Rajasthan ====
The case fought against sexual harassment in the workplace and was filed by Bhanwari Devi, who, after trying to stop the marriage of a one-year-old girl in rural Rajasthan, was raped by five men. She faced numerous problems when she (Devi) attempted to seek justice. Naina Kapoor decided to initiate a PIL to challenge sexual harassment at workplace in the Supreme Courts.

The judgement of the case recognized sexual harassment as a violation of the fundamental constitutional rights of Articles 14, 15, and 21. The guidelines also directed for sexual harassment prevention.

==== M. C. Mehta v. Union of India ====
The court shut down numerous industries and allowed them to reopen only after controlled pollution disposal in the Ganga basin.

== Impact of PIL ==
A controversial study by social scientist Hans Dembowski concluded that PILs had been successful in making official authorities accountable to NGOs. While Dembowski also found some effect at the grassroots level, PIL cases dealing with major environmental grievances in the Kolkata urban agglomeration did not tackle underlying problems (such as inadequate town planning). Dembowsk wrote about it in his book, Taking the State to Supreme Court - Public Interest Litigation and the Public Sphere in Metropolitan India which was originally published by Oxford University Press in 2001. The publisher, however, discontinued distribution because of contempt of court proceedings initiated by the Calcutta High Court. The author, who claimed he was never officially notified by the court, republished the book online with German NGO Asia House.

PILs have failed to provide justice to the poor and needy in whose name it was initiated. In a path breaking report published in 2005, it was opined that PILs instead of helping the poor are adversely affecting their homes and livelihoods. It has in effect become an industry. The Report demanded an independent study to be conducted on the impact of PILs.

PIL Dravyavati River by Committee for Protection of Public Properties

Earlier, the princely state of Jaipur used to get water from this river by making a canal, later this river turned into a dirty drain. There are more than 160 tubewells around it. Those who are giving water to the city. There have been infections in many tube wells. The State Human Rights Commission took cognizance of the transition to water in the year 2001. A citizens committee became a party to the case and decided that the river should be brought in its original form. Expert committee was formed. In 2007, when no action was ruled on the case, the PIL of the river was presented. Many constructions were broken and currently the river is 48 km long. Influential people bought land at the cost of Kodis from poor accountants in the river and did not allow the original width of the river to be restored. The current width is 210 feet. Later Tata projects worked on the rejuvenation of Dravyavati river projects with the Jaipur Development Authority. Rapid urbanisation in the last 3-4 decades, coupled with rampant encroachments in the river area and its catchment areas and the dumping of sewage, industrial waste water, and solid waste, converted this once pristine flowing river to a Nallah. In the first-of-its-kind river rejuvenation activity, the Dravyavati River Project will oversee the amortisation of 170 MLD polluted water and have more than 100 fall structures constructed to turn this rain side river to a perennial river. More than 18,000 trees were planted and 65,000 square meters green area developed under this project.

Public interest litigation on publication of property list of princely state of Rajasthan Article 12 (1) and (II) of the agreement provides that immovable properties of former princely states which were public properties of the princely state on August 15, 1947, will be transferred to the state. In this way, two lists were to be made, if there is a dispute over the property of the transferring property to a new state and the personal property of the other princely states, then the Court will not have the right of trial under Article 363 of the Constitution and the State Ministry of the Government of India (the current home). The decision will be final, the former princely states made a single list and made entire public properties their own. Bhajpa Congress governments kept silence. Public interest litigation is presented in this regard. See detail HIGHCORT site and attached writ petition. D B Civil Writ (P) 10655/15 Writ Petition was submitted regarding the cradle of the agreement reached with Sardar Vallabhbhai Patel and 563 former princely states of the country and 18 princely states of Rajasthan.

== Further considerations ==
A bench consisting of Justices G. S. Singhvi and Asok Kumar Ganguly pointed out that laws enacted for achieving the goals set out in the Preamble to the Constitution were inadequate; the benefits of welfare measures embodied in the legislation had not reached millions of poor people, and efforts to bridge the gap between rich and poor did not yield the desired results.

Singhvi wrote, in a case concerning sewage workers: “The most unfortunate part of the scenario is that whenever one of the three constituents of the state i.e., the judiciary issues directions for ensuring that the right to equality, life, and liberty no longer remains illusory for those who suffer from the handicap of poverty, illiteracy and ignorance, and directions are given for implementation of the laws enacted by the legislature for the benefit of the have-nots, a theoretical debate is started by raising the bogey of judicial activism or overreach”.

The bench clarified that it was necessary to erase the impression on some that the superior courts, by entertaining PIL petitions for the poor who could not seek protection of their rights, exceeded the unwritten boundaries of their jurisdiction. The judges said it was the duty of the judiciary to protect the rights of every citizen and ensure that all lived with dignity.

Such cases may be filed for public interest when victims lack the capability to commence litigation or their freedom to petition the court has been blocked. The court may proceed sua sponte, or cases can proceed on the petition of an individual or group. Courts may also proceed on the basis of letters written to them or newspaper reports.

The Centre for Law and Policy Research, Bangalore (CLPR) hosts a Public Interest Lawyering Hub, where resources on PIL are available.

== See also ==
- Rule of law
- Rule according to higher law
- Parens patriae
- Qui tam
- Legal aid
- Constitution of India
- Constitutional theory
- Fundamental Rights, Directive Principles and Fundamental Duties of India
- Class action
- Civil society
- Weiquan movement
- Judicial activism
