= National Human Rights Commission v. State of Arunachal Pradesh (1996) =

1996 Indian Supreme Court case on the rights of non-citizens

- Court: Supreme Court of India
- Full case name: National Human Rights Commission v. State of Arunachal Pradesh & Anr.
- Decided: 9 January 1996
- Citation: (1996) 1 SCC 742; AIR 1996 SC 1234; JT 1996 (1) 163; 1996 SCALE (1) 155

Case history
- Prior action: Interim order dated 2 November 1995 directing the State of Arunachal Pradesh not to evict Chakmas by coercive action
- Subsequent action: Enforcement sought in Committee for Citizenship Rights of the Chakmas of Arunachal Pradesh v. State of Arunachal Pradesh (2015)

Court membership
- Judges sitting: A. M. Ahmadi (CJI), S. C. Sen

Case opinions
- Decision by: Ahmadi CJI

Keywords
- Article 21, right to life, statelessness, Citizenship Act, 1955, refugee rights, National Human Rights Commission

National Human Rights Commission v. State of Arunachal Pradesh & Anr. is a 1996 Supreme Court of India judgment holding that the constitutional right to life and personal liberty under Article 21 of the Constitution of India extends to every person within Indian territory, including non-citizens, and that the State of Arunachal Pradesh was constitutionally bound to protect the Chakma and Hajong communities settled in the state from threatened forcible eviction. Delivered on 9 January 1996 by a bench of Chief Justice A. M. Ahmadi and Justice S. C. Sen, the judgment arose from a public interest litigation filed by the National Human Rights Commission (NHRC) under Article 32 after the All Arunachal Pradesh Students' Union (AAPSU) issued notices ordering the Chakmas — refugees resettled in the then North-East Frontier Agency between 1964 and 1969 — to leave the state.

The Court issued a writ of mandamus directing the state and central governments to protect the Chakmas from coercive eviction, to process pending applications for citizenship by registration under Section 5(1)(a) of the Citizenship Act, 1955, and to ensure that no individual applicant was evicted while their application remained under consideration. The case is regarded as a landmark in Indian constitutional and refugee law for affirming that fundamental protections under Article 21 are not confined to citizens, and it remains the foundational legal authority underpinning the continuing, and largely unresolved, campaign for citizenship rights by the Chakma and Hajong communities of Arunachal Pradesh.

== Background ==
A large number of Chakmas from the Chittagong Hill Tracts of then East Pakistan (now Bangladesh) were displaced by the construction of the Kaptai Dam hydroelectric project in 1964 and took shelter in Assam and Tripura. Since Assam could not accommodate all of the displaced, the state government sought assistance from other states, and in consultation with the North East Frontier Agency (NEFA) administration, a group of Chakmas — the judgment records an initial figure of about 4,012 — were resettled on land allotted in consultation with local tribal communities, with the Union government sanctioning rehabilitation assistance for each family. By the mid-1990s the Chakma population in the territory that had by then become Arunachal Pradesh was estimated by the Court at approximately 65,000.

Relations between the settlers and sections of the state's indigenous population deteriorated through the late 1980s and early 1990s. In August 1994, The Telegraph reported that the AAPSU had issued "quit notices" ordering all persons it considered foreigners, including the Chakmas, to leave Arunachal Pradesh by 30 September 1994, and that it had threatened to use force if the demand was not met.

== Procedural history ==
On 9 September 1994, the People's Union for Civil Liberties brought the matter to the attention of the NHRC, which wrote to the Chief Secretary of Arunachal Pradesh and the Union Home Secretary seeking information. The state government replied that the situation was under control and that adequate police protection had been provided. On 15 October 1994, the Committee for Citizenship Rights of the Chakmas (CCRC) filed a formal complaint with the NHRC, which the commission treated as a complaint and issued notices to both the state and the Union government calling for reports.

The Union Ministry of Home Affairs informed the NHRC in November 1994 that it intended to grant citizenship to the Chakmas and that central paramilitary forces had been deployed in response to the AAPSU's threats. The state government, however, did not respond to the NHRC's repeated requests for a report on protective steps taken until September 1995, and even then asked for a further four weeks to file a supplementary report, a deadline it also missed. After the CCRC filed further urgent petitions in October 1995 alleging immediate threats to the Chakmas' lives, the NHRC recorded a prima facie finding that officers of the state government appeared to be acting in coordination with the AAPSU to bring about the Chakmas' expulsion, and — concluding it could not itself guarantee their protection — petitioned the Supreme Court for relief. On 2 November 1995, the Court issued an interim order directing the state to ensure that the Chakmas were not ousted from its territory by any coercive action not sanctioned by law.

== Arguments ==
=== State of Arunachal Pradesh ===
The state government denied that any threat existed to the Chakmas' lives and maintained that it had acted in good faith to provide them with basic amenities. It argued that the Supreme Court's earlier decision in State of Arunachal Pradesh v. Khudiram Chakma (1994 Supp (1) SCC 615) had already settled the Chakmas' citizenship claims against them, and that since they were foreigners, they were entitled only to protection under Article 21 and could be directed to leave the state at any time. It disputed that any Chakma deaths were caused by an AAPSU-organised economic blockade, attributing them instead to a malaria epidemic, and argued that its special constitutional status as a tribal-majority state under Part X of the Constitution, together with its limited financial resources, justified resisting further settlement of the community. The Court noted that this position directly contradicted an earlier representation the state had itself made to the NHRC acknowledging that citizenship was governed entirely by the central Citizenship Act and that the state had no jurisdiction over the matter.

=== Union of India ===
The Union government's position was that it had, since a 1972 joint statement by the prime ministers of India and Bangladesh, intended to confer citizenship on the Chakmas under Section 5(1)(a) of the Citizenship Act, 1955, and that children born to Chakma settlers in India before the Act's 1987 amendment had legitimate citizenship claims. It contended that the state government was obstructing this process by failing to forward individual citizenship applications, as required under the Citizenship Rules, 1956, for central government consideration, and stated that it had deployed additional Central Reserve Police Force battalions to protect the Chakmas and had urged the state to ensure the resumption of essential supplies to Chakma settlements after reports of blockade-related malaria and dysentery outbreaks.

== Judgment ==
The Court rejected the state's contention that Khudiram Chakma had foreclosed the citizenship question, holding that the earlier case had concerned a narrower claim to citizenship under Section 6-A of the Citizenship Act — a special provision benefiting certain migrants to Assam under the Assam Accord — whereas the Chakmas' present claim rested on the general registration provision in Section 5(1)(a), which is available to any non-citizen who satisfies its conditions. Citing its own precedent in Louis De Raedt v. Union of India (1991) and Khudiram Chakma, the Court reaffirmed that foreign nationals are entitled to the protection of Article 21.

The Court held that India, as a country governed by the rule of law, is bound to protect the life and personal liberty of every person within its territory, citizen or not, and that no state government could permit any group — naming the AAPSU specifically — to threaten a community with expulsion. It further found that by refusing to forward Chakma citizenship applications to the Union government as required under the Citizenship Rules, 1956, local officials in Arunachal Pradesh were both failing their statutory duty and unlawfully denying the applicants their right to have their claims considered.

=== Directions ===
The Court allowed the petition and issued a writ of mandamus with six directions: that the state protect the life and liberty of every Chakma in its territory against forcible eviction by organised groups such as the AAPSU, using paramilitary or police force if necessary and requesting additional central forces if required; that Chakmas not be evicted from their homes except in accordance with law; that quit notices and ultimatums issued by the AAPSU or any other group be dealt with under the law; that citizenship applications under Section 5 of the Citizenship Act be registered and forwarded by the receiving Collector or Deputy Commissioner to the Union government for consideration, including applications previously returned without action; that no individual applicant be evicted on grounds of non-citizenship while their application remained pending before the competent authority; and that the state pay the NHRC's costs of ₹10,000.

== Significance and legacy ==
The judgment is widely cited in Indian constitutional and refugee-law scholarship as establishing that Article 21 protections apply irrespective of citizenship status, and as an early instance of the Supreme Court using a human-rights-commission-initiated public interest litigation to compel state protection of a vulnerable, largely stateless population. According to Indian Kanoon's case-law database, the decision has been cited in over forty subsequent judgments and remains a standard reference in discussions of the constitutional status of non-citizens and refugees in India.

Despite the ruling, community organisations and the NHRC itself have repeatedly stated that its directions — particularly the forwarding and processing of citizenship applications — remained substantially unimplemented for decades afterward. The judgment's directions were the basis for a further Supreme Court petition, Committee for Citizenship Rights of the Chakmas of Arunachal Pradesh v. State of Arunachal Pradesh (2015), which again directed the state and Union governments to complete the citizenship process, and it has continued to be invoked by the NHRC in subsequent interventions, including a 2022 direction concerning alleged "racial profiling" of the Chakma and Hajong communities through a state-run census.

== See also ==
- Chakmas of Arunachal Pradesh
- Persecution of Chakmas in Arunachal Pradesh
- All Arunachal Pradesh Students' Union
- Citizenship Act, 1955
- National Human Rights Commission of India
