= Persecution of Chakmas in Arunachal Pradesh =

Discrimination against the Chakma in India

Persecution of Chakmas in Arunachal Pradesh refers to a decades-long pattern of discrimination, administrative restriction and, at times, violence directed at the Buddhist Chakma community (and the Hindu Hajong community resettled alongside them) in the Indian state of Arunachal Pradesh, carried out or tolerated by sections of the state's indigenous population — chiefly organised through the All Arunachal Pradesh Students' Union (AAPSU) — and, according to human rights bodies and the community itself, by successive state governments. Though rooted in the community's unresolved citizenship status following its 1964–1969 resettlement from the Chittagong Hill Tracts, the pattern of rights withdrawal, threatened expulsion, administrative exclusion and alleged police abuse has continued, in varying intensity, from the late 1970s to the present day.

Two Supreme Court of India judgments — National Human Rights Commission v. State of Arunachal Pradesh (1996) and Committee for Citizenship Rights of the Chakmas v. State of Arunachal Pradesh (2015) — have held that the state failed in its constitutional duty to protect the community and directed the conferment of citizenship on eligible members, but community organisations and independent monitors report that both judgments remain substantially unimplemented.

AAPSU and successive Arunachal Pradesh governments have characterised their opposition not as persecution but as the legitimate defence of the state's constitutionally protected indigenous and tribal identity, land, and demographic balance, arguing that the Chakmas and Hajongs are refugees who were only ever meant to be settled temporarily. This article presents both the documented pattern of restriction and the state/AAPSU rationale for it, as reported by contemporary sources.

== Background ==
Following their 1964–1969 resettlement from the Chittagong Hill Tracts into the then North-East Frontier Agency (NEFA), Chakma and Hajong settlers initially received the same government facilities as the local population, including ration cards, trade licences, and access to public employment. Amnesty International records that a "series of attacks" on Chakma villagers and their property by the local population began as early as 1979, leaving some families homeless, and that the state government "repeatedly failed to react to their complaints, to compensate the victims or bring the perpetrators to justice." This period coincided with the formation of AAPSU (1979), which — according to its own historical accounts and independent analyses — took up opposition to the Chakma and Hajong settlement as one of its founding causes, inspired in part by the contemporaneous Assam Movement against "foreigners" in neighbouring Assam.

== Systematic withdrawal of rights (1980–1994) ==
Community accounts, corroborated by contemporary press reporting, describe a sequence of administrative measures through which basic facilities extended to the Chakmas and Hajongs at resettlement were withdrawn after NEFA became a Union Territory (1972) and then a full state (1987):

- 1980: the Arunachal Pradesh government barred Chakmas and Hajongs from state government employment.
- 1991: issuance of ration cards to the two communities was stopped.
- 1994: the state government revoked the appointment of Chakmas and Hajongs to the traditional village-headman post of Gaon Burha and to panchayat bodies.
- Trading licences previously issued to Chakma and Hajong shopkeepers and traders were also revoked over this period.

Community organisations describe this as a systematic, incremental "de-recognition" of rights that had earlier been guaranteed by the central government's resettlement plan, and note that the changes coincided with the community being publicly branded as "foreigners" by local political and student bodies.

== Documented attacks on Chakma villages ==
The most detailed contemporaneous documentation of physical attacks on Chakma villages comes from Amnesty International, which recorded that, beginning in 1979 — the year the AAPSU was founded — "a series of attacks" were carried out on Chakma villagers and their property by members of the local population, leaving a number of families homeless. Amnesty's Urgent Action bulletin recorded that the Chakmas "claim that the state government repeatedly failed to react to their complaints, to compensate the victims or bring the perpetrators to justice, thus enhancing their sense of insecurity" — a finding that established, as early as 1994, a documented pattern of both community-level violence and state inaction in response to it.

This pattern culminated in the events of August–September 1994 (detailed below), when the threat of attack became acute enough that thousands of Chakmas fled the state. Independent corroboration of Amnesty's findings appears in a chronology of Indian human-rights events compiled by the Research Directorate of Canada's Immigration and Refugee Board for Refworld (the UNHCR's reference database), which recorded — citing Amnesty and contemporary Indian press coverage, including an India Today feature titled "Chakmas: Living Under Notice of Death" — that the September 1994 Legislative Assembly directive to expel "foreigners" affected an estimated 60,000 Chakmas and a further 40,000 Hajong and Tibetan settlers in the state.

== The 1994 crisis ==
=== The AAPSU "Quit Arunachal Pradesh" notice ===
In August 1994, the AAPSU issued a notice ordering all persons it considered "foreigners" — principally the Chakmas and Hajongs — to leave Arunachal Pradesh by 30 September 1994, and did not rule out the use of force to enforce the deadline. On 10 September 1994, the Arunachal Pradesh Legislative Assembly, then led by Chief Minister Gegong Apang, passed a resolution calling for the removal of all "foreign settlers" from the state, effectively endorsing the AAPSU's position.

=== Flight to Assam and "shoot at sight" orders ===
Faced with these threats, some 2,000 Chakmas — mostly women and children — fled Papum Pare district for neighbouring Assam on 21 August 1994. Assamese authorities refused them permission to stay and forced them back across the state border; on 12 September 1994 the Assam state government issued "shoot at sight" orders in Tinsukia district against "non-nationals" entering the state, a measure aimed principally at the fleeing Chakmas. Legal commentary on the episode records that the central government did not endorse Arunachal Pradesh's expulsion demand but also took no effective steps to protect the threatened communities.

=== Amnesty International intervention ===
On 26 September 1994, Amnesty International issued an Urgent Action bulletin (UA 354/94) expressing fear that Chakmas and Hajongs faced "imminent attack from groups of civilians," and appealed to the Arunachal Pradesh and central governments to guarantee the community's safety under international human rights standards. The bulletin was among the first international human rights documents to record the community's situation, citing the pattern of attacks dating to 1979 and the state's failure to prosecute perpetrators or compensate victims.

=== NHRC v. State of Arunachal Pradesh (1996) ===
The National Human Rights Commission (NHRC), acting on a complaint from the People's Union for Civil Liberties and the Committee for Citizenship Rights of the Chakmas, petitioned the Supreme Court in October 1995 under Article 32. On 9 January 1996, a bench led by Chief Justice A. M. Ahmadi held, in National Human Rights Commission v. State of Arunachal Pradesh & Anr. (1996 AIR 1234), that the right to life under Article 21 applies to all persons in India regardless of citizenship, and directed the state to prevent coercive eviction of the Chakmas and process pending citizenship applications.

== Post-1996: continued exclusion ==
Despite the Supreme Court's order, community organisations and legal researchers report that state authorities continued to obstruct the community's access to citizenship documentation, voter registration and welfare schemes through the late 1990s and 2000s. A 2000 Delhi High Court ruling found that around 90 per cent of the Chakmas and Hajongs were citizens by birth and ordered the Election Commission of India to enrol eligible voters, but only a small fraction — roughly 5,000 of over 60,000 — had actually been registered by the mid-2010s, which activists attributed to deliberate obstruction by local officials. The community also remained excluded from Scheduled Tribe status and land ownership rights available to Arunachal Pradesh's indigenous population, restricting access to formal credit, education quotas and government employment reservations.

== 2015–2019: renewed push and backlash ==
=== The 2015 Supreme Court order and the 2017 shutdown ===
On 17 September 2015, in Committee for Citizenship Rights of the Chakmas v. State of Arunachal Pradesh, the Supreme Court again directed the Union and state governments to confer citizenship on eligible Chakmas and Hajongs within three months and confirmed that the community could not be required to hold an Inner Line Permit. In September 2017, after the Union government indicated it would grant the community "limited citizenship" without land rights or Scheduled Tribe status, the AAPSU called a twelve-hour, state-wide shutdown in protest; supporters set fire to several vehicles, including a state transport bus, during the unrest. Union Minister of State for Home Kiren Rijiju subsequently said the Centre would ask the Supreme Court to "amend" its 2015 order, describing it as "not implementable."

=== Exemption under the Citizenship (Amendment) Act, 2019 ===
The Citizenship (Amendment) Act, 2019 created a fast-track citizenship path for non-Muslim minorities fleeing Pakistan, Bangladesh and Afghanistan, but specifically excluded areas under the Inner Line Permit system, including the whole of Arunachal Pradesh. Community organisations and commentators noted the irony that a law explicitly designed to protect persecuted Buddhist and Hindu minorities from South Asia exempted the very state where the largest such community in India had lived, unresolved, for over five decades.

== Alleged police custodial abuse ==
In October 2019, the National Campaign Against Torture (NCAT), a coalition of Indian civil-society organisations, released a report titled The State of Torture in Arunachal Pradesh, which alleged that Chakmas and Hajongs "regularly face persecution, even at the hands of the state police," and specifically named Diyun police station as the site of at least two custodial deaths of Chakma or Hajong detainees over the preceding decade, one followed by a reported suicide in custody. NCAT coordinator Suhas Chakma attributed the pattern to "systematic and institutionalised discrimination against the Chakmas and Hajongs who live in the area," which he said gave police "license... for lawless law enforcement."

== 2019–2024: documentation restrictions and relocation proposals ==
=== Suspension of Residential Proof Certificates (2019) ===
On 29 July 2019, following demands from the AAPSU — which had threatened a general strike — the Arunachal Pradesh government suspended the issuance of Residential Proof Certificates (RPCs) to Chakmas and Hajongs. Community representatives said the suspension was "nothing but continuation of racial profiling" and noted that it particularly harmed young people seeking to enlist in the Indian Army or apply for government jobs, since RPCs were required supporting documents. The state subsequently directed deputy commissioners to issue a lesser "Temporary Settlement Certificate" instead, and later moved to cancel previously issued RPCs altogether, prompting further protests, including one at New Delhi's Jantar Mantar seeking Union Home Minister Amit Shah's intervention.

=== The August 2021 relocation announcement ===
On 15 August 2021, Chief Minister Pema Khandu announced that the Chakmas and Hajongs would be relocated outside Arunachal Pradesh, a position that Union Law Minister Kiren Rijiju confirmed the same day.

=== The 2021–2022 "special census" and allegations of racial profiling ===
In December 2021, the Changlang district administration announced a dedicated census of Chakma and Hajong residents, to be conducted between 11 and 31 December 2021, distinct from the general population census. The Committee for Citizenship Rights of the Chakmas and Hajongs of Arunachal Pradesh (CCRCHAP) and the Chakma Development Foundation of India (CDFI) called on the community not to cooperate, describing the exercise as "racial profiling" carried out in preparation for deportation or relocation and in violation of the 1996 Supreme Court order's bar on coercive action pending resolution of citizenship claims. The CDFI's complaint to the Prime Minister's Office and the NHRC noted the absence of any comparable census of undocumented migrants from Myanmar or China, or of other communities that had entered the state without an Inner Line Permit, arguing that the Chakmas and Hajongs alone were being singled out. Protests against the census were held in Diyun and at Jantar Mantar in New Delhi.

On 24 January 2022, the NHRC directed the Ministry of Home Affairs and the Arunachal Pradesh government to submit, within six weeks, an action-taken report on the alleged racial profiling and relocation plan, and to "ensure that human rights of the Chakmas and the Hajongs are protected by all the ways." In February 2022, the CDFI further asked the NHRC to summon central and state officials under Section 13 of the Protection of Human Rights Act, 1993 over the state's failure to file the ordered report.

=== 2023–2025: continued relocation proposals ===
In April 2023, Khandu said he was working with the Centre and neighbouring states to find land to relocate the community, describing Arunachal Pradesh as a constitutionally "protected" tribal state that could not permanently host non-tribal settlers. Ahead of the 2024 general election, Rijiju said the community would be granted citizenship under the CAA framework alongside relocation to Assam, prompting Assam Chief Minister Himanta Biswa Sarma to distance his government from the proposal. In October 2025, human rights activist Suhas Chakma publicly accused Khandu of pursuing a relocation plan that he said risked "Manipurisation" of Arunachal Pradesh — a reference to the 2023 ethnic violence in Manipur — and argued any relocation agreement would be constitutionally void.

== Positions of the parties ==
=== AAPSU and the state government ===
AAPSU has consistently framed its opposition not as persecution of an ethnic or religious minority but as defence of Arunachal Pradesh's constitutionally protected indigenous population, citing the Inner Line Permit regime under the Bengal Eastern Frontier Regulation, 1873, and Article 371(H) of the Constitution, which grants the Governor special responsibility for law and order in the state. The organisation and successive state governments have argued that the Chakma and Hajong population has grown far beyond the roughly 14,888 originally settled in 1964–1969, that this growth threatens to make local tribes a minority in some circles, and that the communities were only ever intended to be temporary refugees who should be resettled elsewhere in India rather than granted permanent rights in Arunachal Pradesh.

=== Chakma and Hajong community organisations ===
Organisations including the Chakma Development Foundation of India, the Committee for Citizenship Rights of the Chakmas and Hajongs of Arunachal Pradesh, the Arunachal Pradesh Chakma Students' Union and the Chakma Rights and Development Organisation dispute the characterisation of the community as refugees, noting that they were permanently settled by the Union government under a formal rehabilitation plan and that the great majority — by most estimates 90 to 95 per cent — are Indian citizens by birth under Section 3 of the Citizenship Act, 1955. They characterise the decades of withdrawn rights, documentation restrictions and relocation proposals as an unconstitutional and unlawful campaign of exclusion.

=== National Human Rights Commission ===
The NHRC has intervened repeatedly since the 1990s, securing the 1996 Supreme Court judgment and issuing further directions in 2022 calling on the Union and state governments to protect the community's human rights and report on compliance, though community organisations say enforcement has remained weak.

== See also ==
- Chakmas of Arunachal Pradesh
- Chakma people
- Hajong people
- All Arunachal Pradesh Students' Union
- National Human Rights Commission of India
- Citizenship (Amendment) Act, 2019
- Statelessness
