= Cause lawyer =

Lawyer dedicated to public interest law

A cause lawyer, also known as a public interest lawyer or social lawyer, is a lawyer dedicated to the usage of law for the promotion of social change to address a cause. Cause lawyering is commonly described as a practice of "lawyering for the good" or using law to empower members of the weaker layers of society. It may or may not be performed pro bono. Cause lawyering is frequently practiced by individual lawyers or lawyers employed by associations that aim to supply a public service to complement state-provided legal aid.

Cause lawyering is performed by a lawyer or a firm that is "most frequently directed at altering some aspect of the social, economic, and political status quo." The content of the issue is not particularly relevant, only the advocacy of an issue and the attempt to bring about social change through legal or even quasi-legal avenues. Cause lawyering can include dedicated advocacy by public interest firms, pro bono work by attorneys in private practice and other non-traditional forms of law practice that advocates a cause. Lawyers who work for the government, whether federal, state, or local, can also be cause lawyers; although the majority of cause lawyering tends to be adversarial towards the state.

== Definition ==
As coined by experts Stuart Scheingold and Austin Sarat in their work Something to Believe In: Politics, Professionalism, and Cause Lawyering, cause lawyering consists of "using legal skills to pursue ends and ideals that transcend client service – be those ideals social, cultural, political, economic or indeed, legal". There is no single "correct" way to define what Cause Lawyering is or who is a cause lawyer. Cause lawyering is particularly hard to put limits around because it encompasses so much in the legal world and almost any issue can be considered an issue or cause that is being advocated for, and thereby qualifying as cause lawyering. Cause lawyering does not require a particular political side, but does require a "determination to take sides in political and moral struggle without making distinctions between worthy and unworthy causes".

Cause lawyering is less about the client and more about the issue the client represents. Cause lawyering is about the belief in a cause or issue and the will/desire to advance that cause. Cause lawyers tend to choose clients on the basis of their own ideological grounds, no matter where they fall on the political, social, economic, and /or legal spectrum. What ultimately separates the cause lawyer from other types of lawyers is the advancement of the cause through the client to transform the status quo in service to a cause that is just as important, or more important, than the client.

In a 2004 American Bar Foundation essay, Thomas M. Hilbink outlined the "typolog[ies]" of cause lawyering. In this essay, cause lawyers are broken into three typologies: (1) Proceduralist Lawyering; (2) Elite-Vanguard Lawyering; and (3) Grassroots Lawyering. Proceduralist lawyering is "marked by a belief in the separation of law and politics, and a belief that the legal system is essentially fair and just". Elite-Vanguard lawyering focuses on law as a superior form of politics that uses the law to render substantive justice in a way that will change substantive law and thereby change society. Grassroots lawyering, however, approaches law as "just" another form of politics, a venue that is corrupt, unjust, or unfair, and aims to achieve substantive social justice through using the law in combination of other social movements, but refraining from using the law as a primary method for social change.

== History ==
What is now known as cause lawyering grew when the idea of "legal science", a 19th-century belief of legal objectivity in which law could be determined through the application of scientific principles and methodologies, was challenged. Until the late 19th century, the legal field worked to separate law and politics, precluding the idea that the law could be used as a force for political or social change. The first organizations to break into cause lawyering and tear down the idea came into existence in the 20th century, the National Association for the Advancement of Colored People (NAACP) and the American Civil Liberties Union (ACLU). Through intermixing political progressivism and the law, these two organizations paved the way for politically themed legal entities to use the law in a way that would advance the cause they represented.

In applying the broad encompassing cause lawyering definition from above, cause lawyering has existed as long as legal advocacy has existed. As long as an advocate has advocated for a client and against a perceived social or legal wrong, although the term was not coined until 1998, cause lawyering has been active. In the late 1800s it was slavery and state's rights, in the early 1900s it was women's suffrage and civil rights. In the 1960s and the non-profit law firm was born. The creation of non-profit law firms ushered in an era of progressive public interest firms modeled after already established like the NAACP and the ACLU to advance progressive causes from the environmental protection to consumer advocacy. These beginning organizations of cause lawyering, and the ones that followed scored major legal victories that have lasting effects to this day; see Brown v. Board of Education

In the 1960s, the Ford Foundation began funding legal services programs as a component of anti-poverty programs helping fund some of the forerunners of legal services for indigent clients: Mobilization for Youth in New York, Action for Boston Community Development, the Legal Assistance Association in New Haven, and the United Planning Organization in Washington. While not identified as cause lawyers at the time, these early programs explicitly fit the mold of using the legal system to advance their cause.

Once the newly minted non-profit law firms were established as charitable organizations eligible for IRS tax-deduction, they began to advocate on behalf of disadvantaged and underrepresented groups, advancing the civil rights and poverty legal work from decades earlier. During the 1970s, feminist law firms began to emerge with the growing Women's Movement and with each newly emerging social movement, new cause lawyering organizations sprung up to complement them. By the mid to late 1970s the explosion of progressive cause lawyering organization was being followed by the creation of more conservative cause lawyering firms. The face of cause lawyering has ebbed and flowed just as political movements, social movements, and economic movements have from the 1970s through today. Major events, like the establishment of the Legal Services Corporation and subsequent restriction; decisions in Loving v. Virginia, Lawrence v. Texas, Roe v. Wade, District of Columbia v. Heller, Citizens United v. Federal Election Commission, National Federation of Independent Business v. Sebelius, Shelby County v. Holder, United States v. Windsor, and Obergfell v. Hodges; along with everyday victories and defeats of cause lawyers all over the United States have shaped our last one hundred years and will continue to shape the legal landscape to come. As Dean F. Michael Higginbotham said in his Keynote Speech at the University of La Verne Law Review Symposium in 2014:

"Make no mistake ... there is no better feeling in this life than to know that you have helped to improve the lives of those around you. Nice to make some money, nice to have material things, but there is nothing better than knowing that you have helped the impoverished, that you have helped the hungry, that you have helped the politically powerless, and that you have helped the undereducated to gain at least a semblance of dignity."

== Public interest lawyering ==
Public interest law is "the legal practice that advances social justice or other causes for the public good". In its most simple form, public interest is defined as "(1) the general welfare of the public that warrants recognition and protection" and "(2) [s]omething in which the public has a stake ..."

=== History ===
The public interest notation was first given to a group of lawyers in the 1960s who fought to address the social injustice that existed in American society. Throughout the late 20th century, many lawyers self-defined themselves as public interest lawyers in order to gain legitimacy and respect as they sought to change complex social, political, environmental, and educational problems. As a result of many attorney's desire to participate in public interest law, organizations, such as the ACLU and NAACP, were formed to develop a collaborative approach to addressing these societal problems. Today, public interest lawyering has expanded greatly to include free legal aid groups, liberal and conservative public interest organizations, partisan environmental groups, and individual lawyers who choose to represent the underrepresented.

=== Definition and debate ===
Ford Foundation

With the increase in self-proclaimed public interest lawyers, the definition and categorization of public interest lawyering continues to be a debated topic. In attempt to narrow the categorization of public interest lawyering, many scholars and researchers have attempted to create a more precise definition of "public interest law". The Ford Foundation was one of the first groups to attempt to define public interest law as an "[a]ctivity that (1) is undertaken by an organization in the voluntary sector; (2) provides fuller representation of underrepresented interests (would produce external benefits if successful); and (3) involves the use of law instruments, primarily litigation." Looking at the role of public interest law groups, Laura Beth Nielsen and Catherine Albiston defined public interest law groups as "organizations in the voluntary sector that employ at least one lawyer at least part time, and whose activities (1) seek to produce significant benefits for those who are external to the organization's participants, and (2) involve at least one adjudicatory strategy." Looking at public interest law as a more broad category, Scott Cummings suggests that public interest law is the legal means that advance the interest of disadvantaged people by way of challenging corporate or governmental policies and practices.

Other scholars have defined public interest laws not by what a lawyer does but by a lawyer's financial self-sacrifice. When discussing young lawyers who are influencing change, Karen Dillon stated that public interest lawyers are those who "have followed their hearts, not necessarily their wallets, into careers that they are convinced will make a difference in the world". Pro bono work of lawyers has become synonymous with the public good, and there is no debate that a majority of pro bono attorneys do contribute to the public good.

=== Public interest and politics ===
There are multiple ideological groups that unite on specific issues and work towards advances the causes that they believe are in the public interest. The early successes of the public interest movements prompted the emergence of public interest law firms, advocating on divisive political issues. In their discussion of cause lawyering, Scheingold and Sarat suggest that cause lawyering, "conveys a determination to take sides in political or moral struggle without making distinctions between worthy and unworthy cause". Today, public interest law firms are at the forefront of public interest groups and political advocacy organizations.

When partisan public interest organizations first gained popularity in the 1960s and 1970s it was the liberal groups that bound together to promote significant social change. Drawing from the strategies developed by previous groups to advance specific causes, like the NAACP, ACLU and LDF, these public interest groups expanded their role to substantive law reform, litigation, and administrative and legislative advocacy. Because of this expansion in services offered, these groups began employing lawyers to create more lasting substantive change through legal reform.

In response to the success of liberal groups advancing their partisan agendas, conservatives began to adopt this type of organization and developed public interest groups of their own. Many of the first conservative public interest groups (the National Right to Work Committee, National Right to Life Committee, Catholic League for Religious and Civil Rights), were created to advance very specific policy goals.

These groups do not necessarily advance the public's interest but are intertwined with corporations and lobbying efforts to advance the interest that benefit their clients and result in financial gain for them. Since their inception, the role in public interest groups in politics has increased drastically, with many of them funding political action committee (PACs) with the purpose of advancing or inhibiting campaigns based on the candidate's stance on important issues. Public interest groups on both sides of the aisle have expanded their roles tremendously and can even be attributed to the divisive political arena that exist today. While their roles have expanded, their overall goals have not. Partisan public interest groups continue pursuing the causes that connect with their ideological beliefs and continue to have successes in advancing these interests.

== Community economic development lawyering ==
Community economic development work includes building coalitions of interested parties to create social policies that improve affordable housing opportunities, increases access to affordable financing options, develops workforce skills, and generally produces more economic production within suffering urban and rural communities. In order to serve their client, CED lawyers are required to be proficient in many areas of the law which include: business, finance, environmental studies, real estate, architecture, public policy, education, employment and human resources, community organizing, organizational development, and change theory among other subjects.

=== History ===
Community economic development efforts have been traced back to the early 1900s to the Tuskegee Institute. During that time Booker T. Washington believed that the best way to advance African Americans interests was through encouraging economic self-sufficiency through encouraging job training and entrepreneurship. He believed that through economic self-sufficiency, hard work, and property ownership, African American communities would, on their own, create greater levels of wealth accumulation within the African community. To achieve his vision, Washington created vocational training programs and presided over the National Business League with the goal of supporting African American business networks, products, and services.

In the 1960s, the Civil Rights Movement brought about changes to Community Economic Developments advocacy by focusing on grassroots programs in order to achieve greater levels of equality in poor urban and rural communities. Groups like the Southern Christian Leadership Conference and Poor People's Movement began lobbying the Federal Government to create an economic bill of rights which demanded, among other things, improving the economic conditions within underrepresented urban and rural communities. In response, the Federal government created focused programs that targeted disadvantaged communities by providing increased education, job training, and family services.

Beginning with the Omnibus Budget Reconciliation Act of 1981, both state and federal governments began to reinvest in struggling urban and rural communities through the creation of Enterprise Zones. The purpose of the newly created Enterprise Zones was to stimulate job creation within urban communities through tax breaks to relocating companies, job training and ultimately economic growth. Despite their good intentions, empirical studies have concluded that unless the underlying conditions are ready for economic development, the net benefit of the economic zone program is minimal. According to these studies, the underlying conditions needed to improve an economic zones chances of success are: low unemployment, high levels of investment and suburbs.

Beginning in the 1990s, cause lawyers have also been active in the Free-culture movement, fighting for the freedom to create and modify creative works such as through the Creative Commons.

=== Criticisms of CED ===
According to Audrey G. McFarlane, CED lawyering efforts have fallen short of their intended goals of building economic development within a community. McFarlane asserts that the economic transformation within Economic Zones has failed in three ways. First, the structure of the economic stimulus has been designed to benefit large corporations that generally do not require high paying jobs. Second, the very fact that the programs are assigned to a geographical location further strengths the stigma associated with investing in "ghettos". Finally, simply providing a job does not address the entire problem facing a community and should include housing programs, workforce development, and food security among other things.

== Organizations ==
A significant portion of cause lawyering is done through special interest groups or legal advocacy organizations. Cause lawyering groups are a type of public interest law organization (PILO). These organizations are generally structured as 501(c)(3) nonprofits. These organizations are generally tied to specific social movements. For example, there are legal advocacy organizations for a wide range of causes such as environmentalism, racial justice, feminism, Evangelical Christianity, consumers, the poor, and civil liberties. These organizations allow cause lawyers to pool time and resources to develop complex litigation strategies for their causes. They often employ staff, have formal members, rely on grant or foundation funding, and even operate on a national scale.

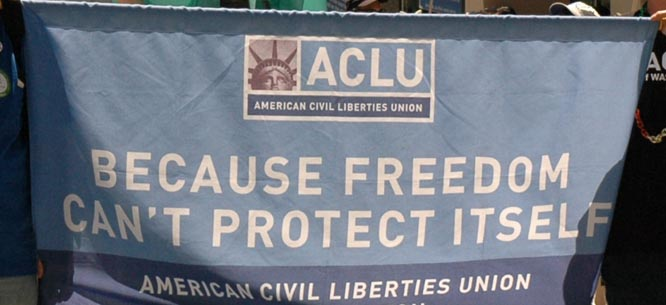
American Civil Liberties Union

These groups may use "test cases" to change the law to reach the group's political goal. For example, the American Civil Liberties Union (ACLU) famously defended John Scopes in the Scopes Monkey Trial. In 1925, Tennessee passed the Butler Act which outlawed the teaching of evolution. The ACLU offered to defend anyone arrested for teaching evolution in violation of the Butler Act. High school biology teacher. Scopes urged students to testify against him and he was eventually arrested under the Butler Act. Clarence Darrow defended Scopes on behalf of the ACLU. Although Scopes lost at trial, the proceedings were heavily publicized and changed public opinion on the role of faith in public schools. Legal advocacy groups also educate the public and political leaders about their causes, sometimes through litigation.

=== Notable legal advocacy groups ===
Southern Poverty Law Center

While the ACLU concerns itself with a broad array of civil rights issues, the National Association for the Advancement of Colored People (NAACP) and Southern Poverty Law Center (SPLC) share a narrower focus on racial justice issues. Spearheaded by lawyer and future Supreme Court justice Thurgood Marshall, the NAACP used planned litigation to reverse the "separate but equal" doctrine in Brown v. Board of Education. Other prominent legal advocacy groups include the Animal Legal Defense Fund, Center for Constitutional Rights, Innocence Project, Lawyers' Committee for Civil Rights under Law, Legal Momentum, and the Sylvia Rivera Law Project.

Legal advocacy organizations span the political spectrum. Originally, these groups tended to support politically liberal causes. Today, there are many politically conservative legal advocacy organizations, such as the Liberty Counsel. Many of such groups are called Christian conservative legal organizations (CCLOs). The Alliance Defending Freedom and American Center for Law and Justice are also prominent CCLOs. CCLOs tend to focus their litigation on religious freedom, opposing same-sex marriage, and the right to life movement.

=== Criticisms of legal advocacy groups ===
Some grassroots organizations criticize national legal advocacy groups for dominating social movements. Legal advocacy groups may set the political agendas of social movements because legal advocacy groups generally have significantly more resources than grassroots activist groups. Additionally, legal advocacy groups may use a "top-down" approach to identifying and solving social problems without considering the actual needs of groups at the grassroots level.

== Trends ==
=== United States trends ===
In 2004, Joel F. Handler conducted research that focused on how public interest law firms have changed over time. Citing a 1978 Weisbrod study, Handler surveyed other cause lawyers to determine how cause lawyering has changed over time. According to the study, cause lawyer organizations have become multi-issue driven as opposed to the single issue focus held in the past. In addition to expanding the scope of a public interest practice, Handler cites that this shift has also included the expansion into other non-legal advocacy which includes: researching, writing and, conducting education and outreach programs.

Due to the diversification of public interest organizations, the focus of most public interest organizations has become more diluted. Handler found that since 1975, the historically liberal public interest topics have, for the most part, experienced a decline in the percent of effort expended. Offsetting this decrease, Handler notes that growth has primarily been experienced within conservative public interest issues and addressing housing issues.

=== International trends ===
Cause lawyering has recently taken on a more international emphasis with lawyers working to produce social change most notably within the People's Republic of China. Primarily focused on expanding the recognition of human rights, Chinese public interest lawyers have attempted to change the government by litigating high-profile cases and organizing public gatherings demanding government reform. In response, the Chinese government has attempted to silence the cause lawyers by limiting their efficacy through "law based" restrictions and "extra-legal" measures. According to the Leitner Center, the Chinese Communist Party has been instrumental in passing laws that limit Chinese lawyers ability to effectively practice law by restricting access to clients, charging registration fees and coercing lawyers to drop unpopular cases in exchange for more favorable licensing treatment. In addition to these "law based" restrictions, the Leitner Center has documented cases where lawyers have been detained and even disappeared after refusing to drop unpopular cases.

Cause lawyers in South American countries have begun to advocate more effectively by forming cause-lawyering networks. Covering a wide range of issues, these networks primarily focus on issues surrounding human rights and the environment.

In Japan cause lawyers are playing an increasing role in migrants rights. They have formed cause lawyering organization especially to protect the human rights of asylum seekers and temporary migrant workers in the Technical Intern Training Program.

== See also ==
- Private attorney general
- Public interest
- Public interest law
- Social change
- Social justice
- The Hollow Hope
- Impact litigation

== Sources ==
- Ann Southworth, What Is Public Interest Law? Empirical Perspectives on an Old Question, 62 DePaul L. Rev. 493, 496 (2013)
- Anna-Maria Marshall, Daniel Crocker Hale, Cause Lawyering, 10 Ann. Rev. L. & Soc. Sci. 301, 301 (2014).
- Anne Bloom, Practice Style and Successful Legal Mobilization, Law & Contemp. Probs., Spring 2008.
- Avi Brisman, Reframing the Portrait of Lynne F. Stewart, 12 J. L. Society 1 (2011).
- Avi Brisman, The Criminalization of Peacemaking, Corporate Free Speech, and the Violence of Interpretation: New Challenges to Cause Lawyering, 14 CUNY L. Rev. 289 (2011).
- Barclay, Scott, and Shauna Fisher. "Cause lawyers in the first wave of same sex marriage litigation." Cause lawyers and social movements 84 (2006).
- Benjamin W. Heineman, Jr., In Pursuit of the Public Interest the Genteel Populists (Book Review), 84 Yale L.J. 182, 183 (1974)
- Bettina E. Brownstein, Private Practice and Cause Lawyering: A Practical and Ethical Guide, 31 U. Ark. Little Rock L. Rev. 601 (2009).
- Burton A. Weisbrod, Conceptual Perspective on the Public Interest: An Economic Analysis, in Public Interest Law: An Economic and Institutional Analysis 22
- Calmore, John O. "Call to Context: The Professional Challenges of Cause Lawyering at the Intersection of Race, Space, and Poverty, A." Fordham L. Rev. 67 (1998): 1927.
- Carol Rice Andrews, Ethical Limits on Civil Litigation Advocacy: A Historical Perspective, 63 Case W. Res. L. Rev. 381 (2012).
- Cause Lawyering in Transnational Perspective: National Conflict and Human Rights in Israel/Palestine, 31 Law & Soc'y Rev. 473 (1997).
- David Luban, The Moral Complexity of Cause Lawyers Within the State, 81 Fordham L. Rev. 705 (2012).
- Deborah J. Cantrell, Lawyers, Loyalty and Social Change, 89 Denv. U. L. Rev. 941 (2012).
- Deborah J. Cantrell, Sensational Reports: The Ethical Duty of Cause Lawyers to Be Competent in Public Advocacy, 30 Hamline L. Rev. 567, 568 (2007).
- Deborah Rhode, Public Interest Law: The Movement At Midlife, 60 Stan. L. Rev. 2027 (2008)
- Etienne, Margareth. The Ethics of Cause Lawyering: An Empirical Examination of Criminal Defense Lawyers as Cause Lawyers, Vol. 95, The Journal of Criminal Law and Criminology (1973), pp. 1195–1260
- Fu, Hualing, and Richard Cullen. "Weiquan (rights protection) lawyering in an authoritarian state: Building a culture of public-interest lawyering." The China Journal 59 (2008); Weiquan (Rights Protection) Lawyering in an Authoritarian State: Building a Culture of Public-Interest Lawyering.
- Harbaugh, William Henry (1973). Lawyer's Lawyer: the Life of John W. Davis. Oxford University Press; Schlegal, J. (2009); Conflating the Good with the Public Good, Private Lawyers and the Public Interest: The Evolving Role of Pro Bono in the Legal Profession. Oxford: University Press
- Harbaugh, William Henry (1973). Lawyer's Lawyer: the Life of John W. Davis. Oxford University Press; Schlegal, J. (2009).
- Howard M. Erichson, Doing Good, Doing Well, 57 Vand. L. Rev. 2087, 2095 (2004) (stating the need to depart from a one-size fits all definition for public interest lawyering).
- Jeffrey Needle, Something to Believe in: Politics, Professionalism and Cause Lawyering Stuart A. Scheingold Sarat Stanford University Press Www.sup.org 192 Pp., $35, Trial, April 2005.
- John Henry Schlegel, Conflating the Good with the Public Good in Private Lawyers and the Public Interest (Robert Granfield & Lynn Mather, eds. 2009)
- Jothie Rajah, Arun K. Thiruvengadam, Of Absences, Masks, and Exceptions: Cause Lawyering in Singapore, 31 Wis. Int'l L.J. 646 (2013).
- Karen Dillon & Jim Schroeder, The Public Sector 45: Forty-five Young Lawyers Outside the Private Sector Whose Vision and Commitment are Changing Lives, Am. Law., Jan./Feb. 1997, at 80.
- Klebanow, Diana, and Jonas, Franklin L. People's Lawyers: Crusaders for Justice in American History, M.E. Sharpe (2003)
- Laura J. Hatcher, Fighting for Political Freedom: Comparative Studies of the Legal Complex and Political Liberalism. by Terence C. Halliday, Lucien Karpik, and Malcolm Feeley, Eds. Oxford, United Kingdom: Hart Publishing, 2007. Pp. x+508., 43 Law & Soc'y Rev. 231 (2009).
- Lea B. Vaughn, A Few Inconvenient Truths About Michael Crichton's State of Fear: Lawyers, Causes and Science, 20 Seton Hall J. Sports & Ent. L. 49 (2010)
- Margareth Etienne, The Ethics of Cause Lawyering: An Empirical Examination of Criminal Defense Lawyers As Cause Lawyers, 95 J. Crim. L. & Criminology 1195 (2005).
- Mark V. Tushnet, The NCAAP's Legal Strategy Against Segregated Education,1925-1950 at 105-137 (1987).
- Meili, Stephen. "Latin American cause-lawyering networks." Cause lawyering in the state in a global era (2001).
- Michael Ashley Stein et al., Cause Lawyering for People with Disabilities Law and the Contradictions of the Disability Rights Movement. by Samuel R. Bagenstos. New Haven & London: Yale Univ. Press. 2009. Pp. Xii, 228.., 123 Harv. L. Rev. 1658 (2010).
- Model Rules of Professional Conduct 6.1
- Patricia Goedde, From Dissidents to Institution-Builders: The Transformation of Public Interest Lawyers in South Korea, 4 E. Asia L. Rev. 63 (2009).
- Patrick J. Bumatay, Causes, Commitments, and Counsels: A Study of Political and Professional Obligations Among Bush Administration Lawyers, 31 J. Legal Prof. 1 (2007).
- Rosenberg, Gerald N. The Hollow Hope: Can Courts Bring About Social Change? Second Edition (American Politics and Political Economy Series (University Of Chicago Press, 2008)
- Russell G. Pearce, The Lawyer and Public Service, 9 Am. U. J. Gender Soc. Poly & L. 1 (2001).
- Sarat, Austin, and Stuart A. Scheingold. Cause lawyers and social movements. Stanford University Press, 2006.
- Sarat, Austin, and Stuart A. Scheingold. The Worlds Cause Lawyers Make: Structure and Agency in Legal Practice (Stanford Law and Politics; 2005)
- Sarat, Austin, and Stuart A. Scheingold. "The dynamics of cause lawyering: Constraints and opportunities." The worlds cause lawyers make: structure and agency in legal practice (2005).
- Scheingold and Sarat, Something to Believe In: Politics, Professionalism, and Cause Lawyering (Chapters 1 & 2) (2004)
- Scott Barclay, Daniel Chomsky, How Do Cause Lawyers Decide When and Where to Litigate on Behalf of Their Cause?, 48 Law & Soc'y Rev. 595 (2014).
- Scott L. Cummings & Deborah L. Rhode, Public Interest Litigation: Insights From Theory and Practice, 36 Fordham Urban Law Journal (2009).
- Scott L. Cummings, The Internationalization of Public Interest Law, 57 Duke L.J. 891, 1034-35 (2008)
- Shamir, Ronen, and Neta Ziv. "State-oriented and community-oriented lawyering for a cause." Cause Lawyering and the State in a Global Era(2001): 287.
- Steven K. Berenson, Government Lawyer As Cause Lawyer: A Study of Three High Profile Government Lawsuits, 86 Denv. U. L. Rev. 457 (2009).
- Stuart A. Scheingold, Essay for the in-Print Symposium on the Myth of Moral Justice, 4 Cardozo Pub. L. Pol'y & Ethics J. 47 (2006).
- The Identity Crisis in Public Interest Law, 46 Duke L.J. 327
- The Plaintiff As Person: Cause Lawyering, Human Subject Research, and the Secret Agent Problem,119 Harv. L. Rev. 1510 (2006).
- Thomas M. Hilbink, You Know the Type...: Categories of Cause Lawyering, 29 Law & Soc. Inquiry 657 (2004)
- Waikeung Tam, Political Transition and the Rise of Cause Lawyering: The Case of Hong Kong, 35 Law & Soc. Inquiry 663 (2010)
