= G. Vasantha Pai =

Indian politician

Vasantha Pai

Member of the Tamil Nadu Legislative Council

Personal details
- Spouse: Shantha Bai
- Education: Madras Law College

Guna Vasantha Pai was a Senior Advocate of the Madras High Court and Indian Supreme Court, a freedom fighter, activist and a member of the Tamil Nadu Legislative Council (MLC). He is best known for filing one of the first public interest litigations against the then sitting Chief Justice of the Madras High court S. Ramachandra Iyer after Pai found evidence that the judge had forged his date of birth to avoid compulsory retirement at the age of 60 and the judge's younger brother sent invitations to celebrate his 60th birthday. This led the then Chief Justice of India P. B. Gajendragadkar to ask Ramachandra Iyer to resign as the case would severely damage the judiciary and he resigned before the case came up for hearing. This led the case to be dismissed as he had resigned. He was elected to the Tamil Nadu Legislative Council and he refused to take oath from the then pro-tem chairman, Abdul Wahab as he had advocated secession and swore himself as a legislator. His oath was upheld by the Madras High Court.

== Early life ==
At a young age, Vasantha Pai joined public life. He actively participated in India's freedom struggle as a response to Mahatma’s call. Pai enrolled as a student of the Madras Law College. With lot of struggles, he obtained his law degree. Later Pai got his early practical training from his father, Guna Pai, who was a famous commercial lawyer in Ernakulam, Kerala. Pai moved to Chennai in the 1950s and started his legal practice. During the same time, the Indian High Courts began in exploring their new constitutional powers under the writ jurisdiction. Vasantha Pai specialized in election law issues and corporate matters and became a well-known authority on these legal subjects.
