= Austin Sarat =

American political science professor

Austin Sarat (born November 2, 1947) is an American political scientist who is William Nelson Cromwell Professor of Jurisprudence and Political Science at Amherst College in Amherst, Massachusetts. He is also a Five College Fortieth Anniversary Professor. He has written, co-written, or edited more than fifty books in the fields of law and political science.

== Education ==
Professor Sarat received a B.A. from Providence College in 1969, and both an M.A. and Ph.D. from the University of Wisconsin-Madison in 1970 and 1973, respectively. He also received a J.D. from Yale Law School in 1988.

He was awarded an MA ad eundem gradum by Amherst College in 1984 and an honorary LLD from his undergraduate alma mater Providence College in 2008.

== Career ==
Sarat's primary research interest is the use of the death penalty, which he refers to as "state killing."

Sarat has received the Ronald Pipkin Service Award, awarded annually to a Law and Society Association member who has demonstrated sustained and extraordinary service to the Association, 2014. He has received the Law and Society Association's Harry Kalven Award. He also has received the Lasting Contribution Award, awarded by the American Political Science Association's Section on Law and Courts "for a book or journal article, 10 years or older, that has made a lasting impression on the field of law and courts" recognizing "The Emergence of Transformation of Disputes: Naming, Blaming, Claiming," 2011, and multiple other awards dating back to 1989.

== Publications ==
- Lethal Injection and the False Promise of Humane Execution, with Mattea Denney, Nicolas Graber-Mitchell, Greene Ko, Lauren Pelosi, and Rose Mroczka. Stanford University Press, 2022.
- Gruesome Spectacles: Botched Executions and America's Death Penalty: Stanford University Press, 2014
- Re-imagining To Kill a Mockingbird: Family, Community, and the Possibility of Equal Justice under Law. University of Massachusetts Press, 2013
- Legal Responses to Religious Practices in the United States: Accommodation and its Limits. Cambridge University Press, 2012
- The Secrets of Law, with Lawrence Douglas and Martha Umphrey. Stanford University Press, 2012
- Imaging New Legalities: Privacy and its Possibilities in the Twenty First Century, with Lawrence Douglas and Martha Umphrey. Stanford University Press, 2011
- Life Without Parole: America’s New Death Penalty?, with Charles Ogletree NYU Press, 2012
- Dissenting Voices in American Society: The Role of Judges, Lawyers, and Citizens. Cambridge University Press, 2012
- Merciful Judgments and Contemporary Society: Legal Problems, Legal Possibilities. Cambridge University Press, 2011
- Transitions: Legal Changes, Legal Meanings University of Alabama Press, 2011
- Who Deserves to Die, with Karl Shoemaker University of Massachusetts Press, 2011
- Imagining Legality: When Law Meets Popular Culture. University of Alabama Press, 2011
- Options for Teaching: Teaching Literature and Law, with Cathrine O. Frank and Matthew Anderson. Modern Language Association, 2011
- Law as Punishment/Law as Regulation, with Lawrence Douglas and Martha Umphrey. Stanford University Press, 2011
- Is the Death Penalty Dying?: European and American Perspectives Cambridge University Press, 2011
- Subjects of Responsibility, with Andrew Parker and Martha Umphrey Fordham University Press, 2011
- Law Without Nations, with Lawrence Douglas and Martha Umphrey. Stanford University Press, 2010
- Performances of Violence, with Carleen Basler and Tom Dumm University of Massachusetts Press, 2010
- When Government Breaks the Law: Prosecuting the Bush Administration, with Nasser Hussain. New York University Press, 2010
- Law and the Stranger, with Lawrence Douglas and Martha Umphrey Stanford University Press, 2010
- Speech and Silence in American Law. Cambridge University Press, 2010
- Sovereignty, Emergency, Legality. Cambridge University Press, 2010
- Law and the Humanities: An Introduction, with Cathrine O. Frank and Matthew Anderson. Cambridge University Press, 2009
- The Road to Abolition, with Charles Ogletree. New York University Press.
- Crisis and Catastrophe: Political, Legal, and Humanitarian Responses, with Javier Lezaun. University of Massachusetts Press, 2009
- When Law Fails: Making Sense of Miscarriages of Justice. ed., with Charles Ogletree. New York University Press, 2009
- The Cultural Lives of Cause Lawyers, ed., with Stuart Scheingold. Stanford University Press, 2008
- Forgiveness, Mercy, Clemency, ed., with Nasser Hussain. Stanford University Press, 2007
- Trauma and Memory: Reading, Healing, and Making Law, ed., with Michal Alberstein and Nadav Davidovitch. Stanford University Press, 2007
- Cause Lawyers and Social Movements, ed., with Stuart Scheingold. Stanford University Press, 2006
- From Lynch Mobs to the Killing State: Race and The Death Penalty in America, ed. with Charles Ogletree. New York University Press, 2006
- The Cultural Life of Capital Punishment: Comparative Perspectives, ed., with Christian Boulanger. Stanford University Press, 2005
- Mercy on Trial: What It Means To Stop an Execution. Princeton University Press, 2005
- The Limits of Law, ed., with Lawrence Douglas and Martha Umphrey. Stanford University Press, 2005
- Law on the Screen, ed., with Lawrence Douglas and Martha Umphrey. Stanford University Press, 2005
- Dissent in Dangerous Times ed., University of Michigan Press, 2005
- Something to Believe In: Politics, Professionalism, and Cause Lawyers, with Stuart Scheingold. Stanford University Press, 2004
- Law in the Liberal Arts, ed., Cornell University Press, 2004
- Cultural Analysis, Cultural Studies and the Law: Moving Beyond Legal Realism, ed., with Jonathan Simon. Duke University Press, 2003
- Looking Back At Law's Century: Time, Memory, and Change, ed., with Bryant Garth and Robert Kagan. Cornell University Press, 2002
- When the State Kills: Capital Punishment and the American Condition. Princeton University Press, 2001
- Law, Violence, and the Possibility of Justice, ed., Princeton University Press, 2001
- Pain, Death, and the Law, ed., University of Michigan Press 2001
