= Public interest law =

Legal practices undertaken to help poor or marginalized people

Public interest law refers to legal practices undertaken to help poor, marginalized, or under-represented people, or to effect change in social policies in the public interest, on 'not for profit' terms (pro bono publico), often in the fields of civil rights, civil liberties, religious liberty, human rights, women's rights, consumer rights, environmental protection, and so on.

In a celebrated 1905 speech, Louis Brandeis decried the legal profession, complaining that "able lawyers have to a large extent allowed themselves to become adjuncts of great corporations and have neglected their obligation to use their powers for the protection of the people."

In the tradition thus exemplified, a common ethic for public-interest lawyers in a growing number of countries remains "fighting for the little guy".

== By jurisdiction ==
=== Central and Eastern Europe ===
At the end of the communist period in the early 1990s, the national legal systems of Central and Eastern Europe were still in a formative stage. The most important source of legal authority for the new human rights groups came from outside the region: the Council of Europe, with its European Convention on Human Rights, and the European Court of Human Rights.

Over time, in the mid-1990s, U.S. experiences became more relevant. The Council of Europe's prerequisite that lawyers use their own country's courts first to seek legal remedies before turning to the European bodies gradually became more than a pro forma exercise, and civil society organizations began to make more effective use of domestic means of adjudication. But by the time local activists were ready to consider the utility of impact litigation, test cases, and other tactics familiar from the U.S. experience, they already understood that their ultimate tactical weapon in any piece of litigation was to use the threat or reality of a supportive decision at the European Court of Human Rights. With this background in mind, it made more sense for the promoters of public interest law in Central and Eastern Europe to talk about "strategic litigation" than about public interest litigation. Using the instrumentality of the European Court of Human Rights effectively required a strategic approach. Not all human rights cases were likely to receive a favorable ruling; a negative ruling could produce more damage to the human rights cause than no ruling at all. The European Court had a rich case law that could provide clues to how a future case might be decided, and there were procedural aspects, such as the requirement to exhaust domestic remedies, to consider.

The core lesson from the U.S. experience for local activists was how courts could be used effectively as a tool for civil society engagement in governance.

=== Italy ===
The changes to the Italian electoral law from 2014 to 2017 were both "caused by actions born from the bottom (...) the result of a methodical, studied and concerted action. It has been featured by university professors, constitutional and electoral law-makers, parliamentarians and other elected representatives (...), representatives of civil society and ordinary citizens. Their names are, as voters, in more than twenty introductory pleadings (quotations or appeals)", all of them brought pro bono.

=== China (mainland) ===
Public interest law (公益法) is an accepted term in China, where the basic institutions supporting the rule of law are still extremely nascent. China does not have a common-law system in which lawyers are expected to play a key role in "making law." Nevertheless, a small but effective community of lawyers has gained acceptance of public interest litigation as a legitimate means of resolving social issues and contributing to a harmonious society, and non-governmental actors have significantly improved the enforcement of rights for migrant workers, women, children and those suffering from environmental degradation, among others. For example, public interest lawyers in China have filed lawsuits in court successfully challenging workplace sexual harassment and the involuntary confinement of healthy people to mental hospitals.

A 2014 amendment to the Environmental Protection Law gave non-governmental entities standing to bring public interest litigation against private enterprise responsible for environmental degradation. Environmental public interest litigation filings increased further after the Tengger Desert case consolidated this change. The green peafowl litigation (in which the organization Friends of Nature halted a hydropower project which endangered the species habitat) was China's first "preemptive" biodiversity judgment and established new standards for litigation ecological preservation issues.

=== Hong Kong ===
In Hong Kong public interest law is an emerging field. The chief vehicle for pursuing public interest claims is judicial review. This is the process by which decisions of the government are challenged in the courts. There has been a surge in judicial review cases since 2000. Environmental issues and minority rights are among the most litigated areas.

One of the pioneers in public interest law in Hong Kong was Pamela Baker. In the late 1980s she litigated a series of landmark courtroom cases challenging the government's treatment of Vietnamese refugees. In 1995 the Hong Kong Human Rights Monitor was established with the aim of promoting better human rights protection in Hong Kong. Today, the majority of cause lawyers who represent citizens and social groups in human rights and public policy litigation on a consistent basis in Hong Kong are also members of political parties or active participants in social movements outside the courts.

In Hong Kong, the Legal Aid Department provides funding to legal services for those who pass the means and merits test. The two Legal Aid Schemes that it operates, namely the Ordinary Legal Aid Scheme (OLAS) and the Supplementary Legal Aid Scheme (SLAS) have facilitated the practice of public interest law through narrowing the resource inequality between economically disadvantaged litigants and the government. However, NGOs and charitable organizations are not eligible to get legal aid. The NGOs and Charitable organizations contributed to opening of avenues for people who deserved justice but lacked interest to approach courts and helped them in becoming petitioners to get justice.

Apart from legal aid, the Hong Kong Bar Association and The Law Society of Hong Kong jointly provides the Duty Lawyer Scheme which offers free legal representation to eligible defendants on the first day of court appearance. They also run the Free Legal Advice Scheme at their Legal Advice Centres within nine District Offices in Hong Kong with the aim to provide one-off preliminary legal advice to the general public without imposing any means test. The Hong Kong Bar Association and The Law Society of Hong Kong operate their own Bar Free Legal Service Scheme and Free Legal Consultation Scheme respectively where enrolled law firms and barristers specializing in different fields volunteer to give consultations on a pro bono basis.

In addition, unlike in the United States where NGOs and public interest law groups routinely bring public interest lawsuits on behalf of aggrieved individuals, in-house counsel working in NGOs and charities in Hong Kong are not allowed to directly represent the people these organizations serve. Some commentators believe that the inability of NGOs to directly represent clients in legal proceedings has dampened the growth of public interest law in Hong Kong.

Law schools in Hong Kong also organize various programs to promote the idea of pro bono legal service to students. Pro bono committees of law firms in Hong Kong also meet on a bimonthly basis in the Hong Kong Legal Community Roundtable, a forum for international law firms to discuss development of pro bono work in Hong Kong and the region.

=== India ===
"Public Interest Litigation" or PIL right since its inception in the Indian judicial system, has shown some good examples of safeguarding the rights of the people of India and has strengthened the position of the Supreme Court of India as preeminent guardian of Fundamental Rights enumerated in the Indian Constitution. It was introduced in India around 1979-80 by the Supreme Court judges, Justice V. R. Krishna Iyer along with Justice P. N. Bhagwati. And since then there had been instances when the Courts are keen to decide the matters of public importance without delay, as the case in Shyam Sundar where the court accepted the matter even when the application was made by a letter sent through post.

=== South Africa ===
South Africa has seen significant public interest litigation throughout its constitutional history. During colonial and apartheid rule, public interest litigation was used as a tool of struggle to resist unjust laws. During the late apartheid period from 1979, three public interest organisations were formed: the Legal Resources Centre, the Centre for Applied Legal Studies and Lawyers for Human Rights. Despite the hostile political environment and a legal system that was inimical to public interest lawyering, they achieved some notable successes opposing forced removals and contesting the system of pass laws and other racist laws. However, even as early as the late 19th century, litigation had been used as a strategy for resistance, especially by early black lawyers, many of whom were among the founders of the African National Congress.

Following the transition to democracy, the Constitution of the Republic of South Africa introduced radical changes to the legal system that have facilitated public interest litigation, including a justiciable Bill of Rights, broad rules of standing and flexible remedial powers for courts. Since 1995, the South African public interest litigation sector has grown, with a number of specialist organisations being established, alongside the older generalist organisations. South Africa has since seen extensive public interest lawyering seeking to give effect to the transformative promise of the Constitution, in particular to enforce socio-economic rights and shore up democratic institutions.

=== United States ===
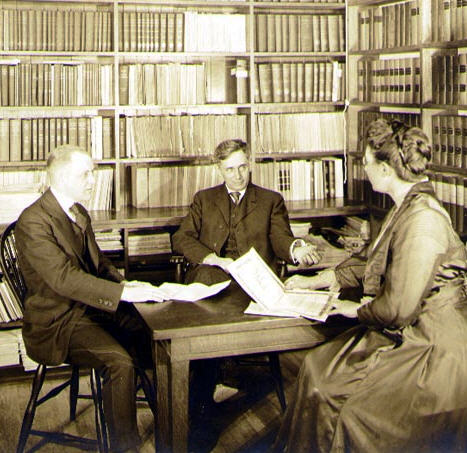
Brandeis (center) in his office 1916.

"Public interest law" is a term that became widely adopted in the United States during and after the social turmoil of the 1960s. It built on a tradition exemplified by Louis Brandeis, who before becoming a U.S. Supreme Court justice incorporated advocacy for the interests of the general public into his legal practice. In a celebrated 1905 speech, Brandeis decried the legal profession, complaining that "able lawyers have to a large extent allowed themselves to become adjuncts of great corporations and have neglected their obligation to use their powers for the protection of the people." In the late 1960s and 1970s, large numbers of American law school graduates began to seek "relevance" in their work—wishing to affect the social issues that were so visibly and hotly debated within American society at that time. They defined themselves as public interest lawyers in order to distinguish themselves from the "corporate adjuncts" referred to by Brandeis.

Summing up the movement's history in the United States, Stanford University Law Professor Deborah Rhode writes: "Public interest lawyers have saved lives, protected fundamental rights, established crucial principles, transformed institutions, and ensured essential benefits for those who need them most....In virtually every major American social reform movement of the last half century, public interest lawyers have played an important role."

Public interest law does not describe a body of law or a legal field; the term was adopted to describe whom the public interest lawyers were representing, rather than what matters they would work on. Instead of representing powerful economic interests, they chose to be advocates for otherwise underrepresented individuals. Consequently, a significant current in public interest lawyering has always emphasized the need to provide legal services to those living in poverty. The term has grown, however, to encompass a broader range of activities of lawyers and non-lawyers working toward a multitude of objectives, including civil rights, civil liberties, women's rights, consumer rights, environmental protection, and so on. Nevertheless, a common denominator for public interest lawyers in the United States and in a growing number of countries remains the ethic of “fighting for the little guy”—that is, representing the underrepresented and vulnerable segments of society.

Public interest law is institutionalized in the United States. Nongovernmental organizations that work to promote and protect human rights using the U.S. legal system, fight to protect the environment, or advocate on behalf of consumers, call themselves public interest law organizations. A large community of lawyers practices public interest law in the form of providing legal aid free of charge to those who cannot afford to pay for it. However, the grim reality remains that lawyers are underpaid and grossly overworked, offering perfunctory representation. Clinical legal education, which is well established in the United States, provides opportunities for law students to do practical legal work on basic legal matters as well as more complex public interest issues, such as women's rights, anti-discrimination law, constitutional rights, and environmental protection, among others. Some law schools have public interest law centers, which advise law students interested in pursuing public interest law careers. Pro bono programs at bar associations and law firms provide opportunities for commercial lawyers to donate time to public interest law activities.

==== Funding ====
Most of the work done by public interest law organizations does not make money because their clients often cannot afford private counsel. In addition, the other activities they perform such as community outreach, organizing coalitions, talking to the press, and initiating grassroots campaigns, do not generate revenue. These organizations rely on federal funds, private foundation grants, donations, state funds, attorney's fees, membership dues, fundraising events, and fellowships for new lawyers. Federal funds and private foundation grants are the largest sources of funding for most organizations, however funding varies based on the type of organization. For example, economic liberalism and environmental organizations follow the membership-oriented approach of leading civil rights organizations such as the American Civil Liberties Union, whereas poverty organizations are more likely to use Legal Services Corporation (LSC) funds. The source of funding influence the impact and strategy pursued.

Since the 1960s/70s the amount of government funding has decreased and the kind of work LSC-funded organizations can perform has been restricted. In 1996, the Omnibus Consolidated Rescissions and Appropriations Act prohibited LSC funds for programs that "engaged in redistricting, lobbying, class action suits, training for political activities, any activities directed toward reforming federal or state welfare systems, abortion or prison litigation" and recovering attorney's fees. These restrictions cause government funded organizations to be more vulnerable to political shifts because the government has significant control over LSC funded organizations.

Because of the restrictions put on LSC-funded organizations, larger organizations such as the American Civil Liberties Union, that want to be able to engage in activities such as lobbying and class action, rely on other sources of funding. Public interest law organizations admit that the preferences of donors affect the priorities they can work on. For example, donors need measurable outcomes in order to see that their money is being put to good use. They will be more likely to donate again if there are concrete outcomes from their donations. The need for outcomes inhibits these organizations from working on more complex problems that tend to have less discrete solutions. It is easier to take on similar cases in order to attract the same donors that were moved to donate in the past. Grassroots organizing and coalition building, because they are not as visible as high profile litigation are not prioritized when resources are limited. However, in order to empower communities, grassroots organizing and coalition building is very important and has led to significant social reforms in the past.

An overall lack of funds necessary to meet the legal needs of the poor and underrepresented is one of the most significant issues facing organizations. Legal aid clinics across the country are forced to decline many of the requests they receive because of lack of resources. Lack of resources and failure to coordinate with individuals causes low-income household to obtain legal aid for less than 20% of their legal needs. During periods of increased hostility toward minorities, lawyers are forced to prioritize only the most severe violations of rights. By only being able to take the most severe cases, many people's needs remain unmet.

=== United Kingdom ===
In law, public interest is a defence against certain lawsuits (for instance some libel suits in the United Kingdom) and an exemption from certain laws or regulations (for instance freedom of information laws in the UK). Also, judges in common law systems can make judgements on the grounds of public policy, a related term.

== See also ==
- Cause lawyer
- John Banzhaf
- Legal mobilisation
- Law
- Natural law
- National Lawyer's Guild
- Private attorney general
- Public defender
- Rutherford Institute
