= Gautompur =

Village in Arunachal Pradesh, India

Gautompur (Chakma: 𑄉𑄯𑄖𑄧𑄟𑄴𑄛𑄪𑄢𑄴) is a village in Arunachal Pradesh, India. According to the 2011 census it had a population of 2,426.
