= Dumpani =

Village in Arunachal Pradesh, India

Dumpani (Chakma: 𑄘𑄪𑄟𑄴𑄛𑄚𑄨) is a village in Arunachal Pradesh, India. According to 2011 census it had a population of 2,331.
