= Avoipur =

Village in Arunachal Pradesh, India

Avoipur (Chakma: 𑄃𑄧𑄤𑄰𑄛𑄪𑄢𑄴) is a village in Arunachal Pradesh, India. According to 2011 census it had a population of 1,969.
