= Asia House (Essen) =

German foundation

Asia House is a German foundation set up in 1992. Since 1995 it is located in the former headquarters of Zeche Zollverein in the city of Essen. Once one of the most eminent coalmines in Germany and now a World Heritage Site recognized by UNESCO, the foundation is an independent group of non-governmental organizations focused on Asia.

Among its members are the Asia Development Bank Working Group, the Burma Initiative, the China program, the South-East Asia Information Centre and the Philippines Office.

Due to international networking with similar organizations and likeminded individuals within Germany and abroad, it is possible to make suppressed and restricted information accessible to the wider public. Asia House's aim is to facilitate a deeper understanding of the region.

The Asia House tries to bundle the strengths of its member organizations. It considers itself as a project open for new developments and ideas. Under its roof it brings together various experiences, contacts and knowledge from all over this very region.
