= Chongkham H.Q. =

Village in Arunachal Pradesh, India

Coordinates: 27.808°N 96.040°E

Chongkham H.Q. is a village in the Chongkham sub-district of Namsai District in Arunachal Pradesh, India. According to the 2011 Census of India it had 1,085 residents in 292 households. 487 were male and 598 were female.
