= Udoipur =

Village in Arunachal Pradesh, India

Udoipur (Chakma: 𑄅𑄘𑄰𑄛𑄪𑄢𑄴) is a village in Arunachal Pradesh, India. According to the 2011 census it had a population of 3,203.
