= Maitripur =

Maitripur (Chakma: 𑄟𑄭𑄖𑄳𑄢𑄨𑄛𑄪𑄢𑄴 is a village in Arunachal Pradesh. According to the 2011 census it had a population of 2,117.
