= Kapila Hingorani =

Indian lawyer (1927–2013)

- Born: 27 December 1927; Nairobi, Kenya
- Died: 31 December 2013 (aged 86); New Delhi, India
- Occupation: lawyer
- Known for: Prison reform
- Children: 3

Pushpa Kapila Hingorani was an Indian lawyer who is regarded as "Mother of Public Interest Litigation" (PIL).

As per then prevailing laws, a petition could be filed only by a victim or a relative. Kapila and her husband Nirmal Hingorani wanted to represent the undertrial prisoners in Bihar. The couple acting on a novel idea, filed a habeas corpus petition on the prisoners’ behalf before the Supreme Court of India. Two weeks after Kapila argued the case in court, the Supreme Court issued a notice to the Bihar government, which led to the release of all the victims in the case, and eventually about 40,000 undertrials across the country. The landmark case came to be known as the Hussainara Khatoon case 1979. Hussainara was one of the six women prisoners. This earned her the title the "Mother of PILs". This case gave rise to a revolution in the Indian legal system. She also revealed the Bhagalpur Blindings, resulting in the Supreme Court directing that the policemen who tortured 33 criminals be prosecuted and the victims released with medical aid and pension for life. She is the first Indian woman to have studied at Cardiff Law School. A plaque has been erected in her honour at Aberdare Hall.

Kapila also undertook the petition where police had blinded 33 suspected criminals using needles and acid, after a lawyer from Bihar wrote to her about the atrocities. Eventually, the Supreme Court ordered medical aid, compensation and pension for life to all the victims.

Kapila died on 31 December 2013 at the age of 86.

In 2017, she became the first female lawyer with a portrait in India's Supreme Court library.
