= S. Ramachandra Iyer =

Indian lawyer (born 1901)

Subramanya Ramachandra Iyer (1 October 1901 – date of death unknown) was an Indian lawyer who served as the Chief Justice of the Madras High Court from 10 May 1961 to 1 November 1964. Madras lawyer Vasantha Pai found evidence that Iyer had falsified his birth date to avoid compulsory retirement at the age of 60 including going to the Judge's birthplace and photographing his original birth register which showed his real age. Judge Iyer denied that he was over 60 years. It became a scandal after the judge's younger brother, Subramanya Rajagopalan, sent invitations to celebrate his 60th birthday while his elder brother the judge's age was shown as below 60 years. Pai filed a petition. Iyer resigned on 1 November 1964 on a request from the then Chief Justice of India P. B. Gajendragadkar as the case would bring the judiciary into disrepute and this led to the petition eventually being dismissed in 1967 on the grounds that Iyer had already resigned his judgeship.
