= Dumpather =

Village in Arunachal Pradesh, India

Dumpather is a village in Arunachal Pradesh. According to the 2011 census it had a population of 2,136.
