= Diyun =

- Sub- District
- Diyun HQ. Block I & II
- Interactive map of Diyun
- Location within Arunachal Pradesh Location within India
- Coordinates: 27.5451°N 96.0997°E
- Country: India
- State: Arunachal Pradesh
- District: Changlang
- Established: 1960s

Government
  - Body: Arunachal Pradesh Legislative Assembly
  - Member of Legislative Assembly: Nikh Kamin
  - Extra Assistant Commissioner: Abraham Modi

Area
  - Total: 210.7 km^{2} (81.4 sq mi)
- Elevation: 205 m (673 ft)

Population (2011)
  - Total: 32,007
  - Density: 152/km^{2} (390/sq mi)

Languages
  - Official: English
  - Spoken: Chakma, Hindi
- Time zone: UTC+5:30 (IST)
- Postal code: 792103
- Vehicle registration: AR
- Literacy: 52.23%

Diyun is a town in the Changlang District of Arunachal Pradesh. It got its name from a very small, seasonal river of the same name. It is surrounded by the foothills of the Eastern Himalayas on two sides and by the Patkai Bum Range on one side.

It had a population of 32,007 in 2011.

== Geography ==
=== Rivers ===
- Merep Hka
- Samthong Hka
- Khamat Hka
- Samthu Hka
- Kumchai Hka
- Khashi Hka

Villages in Diyun Circle
Village Name	Population
Avoipur Bl. I - II	1,969
Balupather	158
Diyun H.Q. Bl.I&II	1,790
Dumba Mossang	149
Dumba Singpho	240
Dumpani Bl.I - III	2,311
Dumpather Bl.I - III	2,136
Gautompur Bl.I - III	2,426
Haripur	894
Innao Ahom	176
Innao Bl. I & II	853
Innao Khamti	170
Innao Pathar	301
Innao Sengmai	91
Jyotipur Bl. I - III	2,164
Jyotsnapur Bl.I & III	2,407
Kamakhyapur	688
Kumchai Deori	155
Kumchaikha	303
Madhupur - I	534
Madhupur-II	457
Maitripur Bl I - III	2,117
Manabhumi H.Q.	464
Mudoi Bl.I & II	919
Mudoi Dweep Bl.I&II	2,109
Rajanagar	410
Shantipur	886
Sompoi-I	765
Sompoi-II	282
Srirampur	480
Udoipur Bl. I - IV	3,203

== Demographics ==
=== Languages ===
Languages spoken in Diyun by more than 1000
Language	Population (as of 2021)	%
Chakma	23,072	72.1%
Hajong	2,387	7.4%
Deori	1,149	3.6%
Hindi	899	2.8%
Assamese	795	2.5%
Nepali	548	1.7%
Tangsa	261	0.8%
Munda	182	0.6%
Adi	152	0.5%
Nyishi	127	0.4%

=== Education ===
==== Private Schools ====
- Mahabodhi Higher Secondary School
- Sneha School
- St. Jude School
- San Bonaventure School
- New Rising English Academy
- IRBN English Medium School
- Bodhi Gyan School
- Karuna Vidya Niketan
- Diyun Valley School
- Intello Global School

=== Religion ===
Religious affiliation (2011)
Buddhism	75.2%
Hinduism	20.8%
Christianity	2.6%
Islam	0.8%
Jain	0.14%
Sikh	0.02%
Others	0.47%
