= All Arunachal Pradesh Students' Union =

Students' union body in Arunachal Pradesh, India

- Abbreviation: AAPSU
- Founded: 1967; 59 years ago
- Headquarters: NEFA Club Building, Itanagar
- Location: Itanagar, India
- Key people: Meje Taku (President); Mato Bui (General Secretary)

All Arunachal Pradesh Students' Union is the apex students' union body in Arunachal Pradesh, India. It executes, regulates, and maintains all the student body organizations in the state. In the absence of a strong opposition party in the state, it sometimes acts as the opposition to the ruling government.

== Election ==
Elections for the All Arunachal Pradesh Students' Union are held in various locations, usually district-wise, across the state after each session. The election tenure is for a three-year term. Since 2012, all AAPSU conferences and elections have been held in Itanagar, the capital city.
