= P. B. Gajendragadkar =

7th Chief Justice of India

Chairman, 6th & 7th Law Commission of India
- In office 1971–1977
- Appointed by: V. V. Giri
- Prime Minister: Indira Gandhi
- Preceded by: K. V. K. Sundaram (5th)
- Succeeded by: H. R. Khanna (8th)

7th Chief Justice of India
- In office 1 February 1964 – 15 March 1966
- Appointed by: S. Radhakrishnan
- Preceded by: B. P. Sinha
- Succeeded by: Amal Kumar Sarkar

Judge of Supreme Court of India
- In office 17 January 1957 – 31 January 1964
- Nominated by: S. R. Das
- Appointed by: Rajendra Prasad

Judge of Bombay High Court
- In office 6 March 1945 – 16 January 1957
- Appointed by: George VI

Personal details
- Born: 16 March 1901 Satara, Bombay Presidency, British India
- Died: 12 June 1981 (aged 80) Bombay, Maharashtra, India
- Children: Dr. Sharad Jahagirdar, Asha Kirtane
- Parent: Balacharya
- Relatives: Ashvathamacharya (brother)
- Education: Karnatak College, Dharwar, Deccan College (Pune), ILS Law College
- Awards: Padma Vibhushan, Zala Vedant Prize

Pralhad Balacharya Gajendragadkar (16 March 1901 – 12 June 1981) was an Indian judge, who served as the 7th Chief Justice of India, from February 1964 to March 1966.

== Early life and career ==
Prahlad Balacharya Gajendragadkar was born into a Deshastha Madhva Brahmin family on 16 March 1901 to Gajendragadkar Balacharya in Satara, Bombay Presidency. Gajendragadkar's family migrated from Gajendragad, a town in Dharwad district in Karnataka to Satara (now part of Maharashtra). Gajendragadkar's father Bal-Acharya (Teacher) was a Sanskrit Vidwan (scholar). P. B. Gajendragadkar, the youngest son of Bal-Acharya followed his older brother Ashvathama-Acharys to Mumbai. He passed M.A. from Deccan College (Pune) in 1924 and LL.B. with honors from the ILS Law College in 1926 and joined the Bombay Bar on the Appellate side. In the early days, he edited the 'Hindu Law Quarterly. His critical edition of the classic 'Dattaka Mimamsa' earned him a great reputation for scholarship. He became the acknowledged leader of the Bombay Bar, well known for his forensic skill and legal acumen. He was influenced by Jawaharlal Nehru's rationality and scholasticism.

In 1945, he was appointed a Judge of the Bombay High Court. In January 1956, he was elevated to the Supreme Court Bench and rose to become the Chief Justice of India in 1964. His contribution to the development of Constitutional and Industrial Law has been hailed as great and unique. Over the course of his tenure of the Supreme Court, he authored 494 judgements and sat on 1,337 benches.

Gajendragadkar intervened and got the then Chief Justice of the Madras High Court S. Ramachandra Iyer to resign after a lawyer G. Vasantha Pai found evidence that he forged his date of birth to avoid compulsory retirement at the age of 60 as the case filed by Pai would severely damage the judiciary and he got Ramachandra Iyer to resign before the case came up for hearing this led the case to be dismissed as he had already resigned his lordship.

At the request of the Government of India, he headed a number of commissions such as the Central Law Commission, National Commission on Labour and the Bank Award Commission. At the request of Indira Gandhi, then the Prime Minister of India, he held the honorary office of the Gandhigram Rural Institute in Southern India.

He served twice as the President of Social Reform Conference and organized campaigns for eradicating the evils of casteism, untouchability, superstition and obscurantism to promote national integration and unity.

Gajendragadkar also carried forward the Madhva tradition of Vedanta and Mimasa. He served as the General Editor of 'The Ten Classical Upanishads', a series sponsored by the Bharatiya Vidya Bhavan. Like his father, Gajendragadkar was also a Mukhasta-vidwan.

== Personal life ==
Gajendragadkar had 2 daughters, Dr. (Mrs.) Sharad Jahagirdar, a renowned gynaecologist who resided in Mumbai, and Asha Kirtane, an artist residing in Pune. His eldest daughter, Dr. (Mrs.) Sharad Jahagirdar married Justice Raghavendra Jahagirdar who served as a judge on the Bombay High Court.

== Education ==
- Satara High School (1911 to 1918)
- Karnatak College, Dharwar (1918–1920)
- Deccan College (Pune) (1920 to 1924)
- Dakshina Fellow (1922–24)
- Bhagwandas Purshotamdas Sanskrit Scholar (1922–24)
- ILS Law College (1924–26)

== Positions held ==
- Judge Bombay High Court 1945–57
- Judge, Supreme Court - 1957
- Chief Justice of India from 1 February 1964. Retired on 15 March 1966
- Honorary Vice-Chancellor of the University of Mumbai (1967)

== Books ==
- Open Library P. B. Gajendragadkar

== Awards ==
In 1972, Gajendragadkar was awarded the Padma Vibhushan award from the Government of India.

Legal offices
Preceded by Bhuvaneshwar Prasad Sinha	Chief Justice of India; 31 January 1964 – 15 March 1966	Succeeded by Amal Kumar Sarkar
