= Shashthipurti =

Hindu ceremony celebrating the 60th birthday

Shashthipurti (Sanskrit: षष्ठीपूर्ति, romanized: Ṣaṣṭhipūrti) or Shashtyabdapurti (Sanskrit: षष्ट्यब्दपूर्ति, romanized: Ṣaṣṭyabdapūrti) is a Hindu ceremony marking the completion of sixty years of age. It also marks the completion of half the years of one's lifetime in Hindu belief, as an age of one hundred and twenty years is considered the theoretical lifespan of a human being.

== Etymology ==
Shashtyabdapurti is a portmanteau derived from Sanskrit words shashthi, meaning sixty, and abdapurti, meaning cycle of sixty years.

== Description ==
The rituals that comprise this ceremony include the shanti and the kranti. The Ugraratha Shanti is a prayer sent to the heavens to make the post-sixty span a spiritually fulfilling experience.

After the successful completion of shanti, the kranti rituals, which signify the transition into a new life, most prominently include a ceremonial wedding and the reaffirmation of kalyana (marriage).

Shashthipurti is regarded to signify a bridge between the householder's domestic concerns and vanaprastha's (the third stage of life) spiritual yearnings. During vanaprastha, the married couple is to fulfill their life's mission by staying together through observance of celibacy. The Kalyana Veduka is a reminder of the unique role they are to play in the years to come.

== Ceremony ==
The Shashthipurti takes place over a period of two days. The ceremony is commenced during an auspicious period by performing "Yamuna Puja", followed by the "Ganga Puja", "Ishta Devata Vandana", "Sabha Vandana", "Punyaha with Panchagavya Sevana", "Nandi Puja", "Ritvikvarana" and Kalasha Sthapana".

Kalasha sthapana of the deities - "Maha Ganapati", "Adityadi Navagraha", "Mrityunjaya","Samvatsara-Ayana-Ritu-Masa-Paksha-Yoga Devata", "Karana Devata", "Rashyadhipati (husband and wife)", "Navadurga", "Saptama Maru Devata", "Dvadasha Aditya – Dhata, Aryama, Mitra, Varuna, Indra, Vivasvan, Tvashta, Vishnu, Anshuman, Bhaga, Pusha and Parjanya", "Ayurdevata, Ishtadevata, Kuladevata". Next Avahana-Prana Pratishthapanam, Shodashopachara Puja, Mahamangalarati, Navagraha and Ganapati Homa.

== See also ==
- Sweet Sixteen (birthday)
- Quinceañera
- Bar and bat mitzvah
- Chu Hua Yuan
