= Chhimtuipui =

Kaladan river
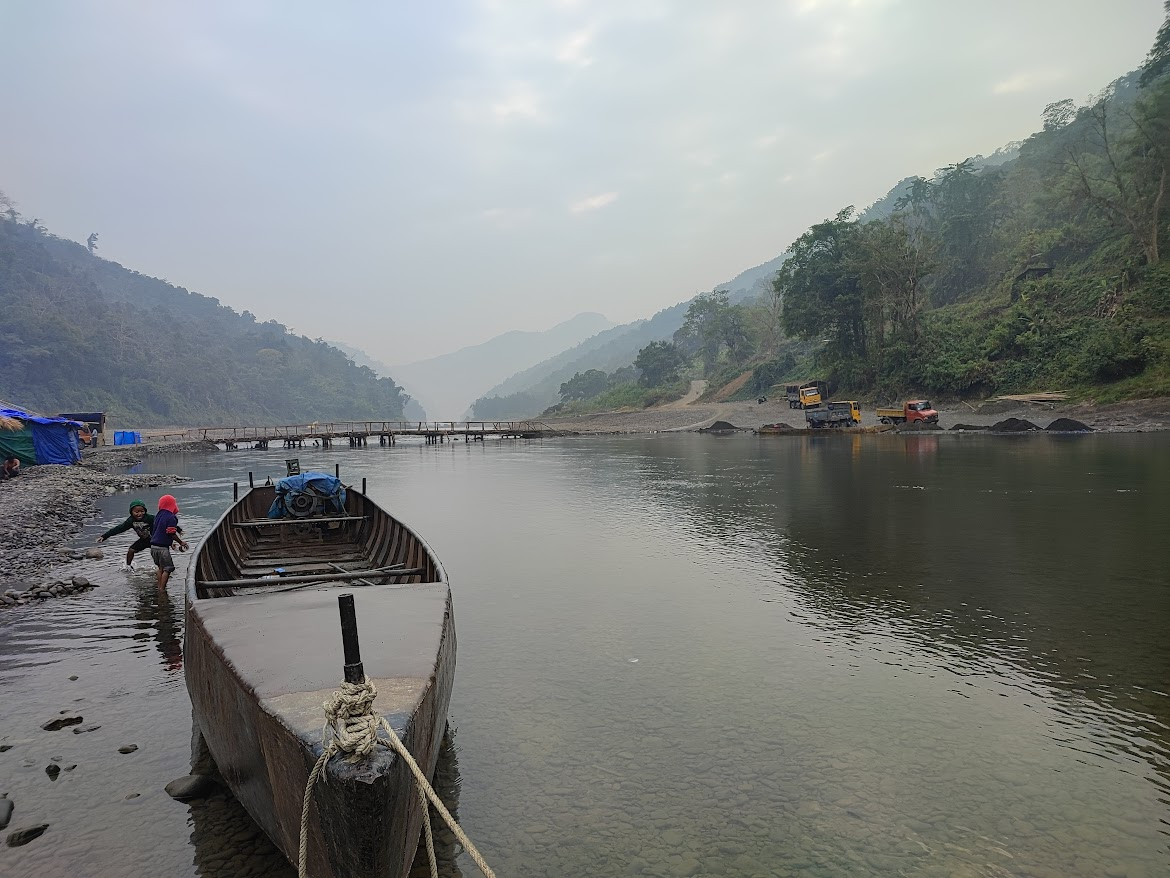
- Chhimtuipui crossing - Tuipui Ferry

- Location of mouth

Location
- Country: India
- State: Mizoram, Chin State, Rakhine State
- Cities: Zochachhuah, Paletwa, Sittwe Port

Physical characteristics
- Source
  - location: India
- Mouth: Sittwe Port
  - location: Rakhine State, Myanmar
  - coordinates: 20°15′58″N 92°18′31″E
  - elevation: 2,325 m (7,628 ft)
- Length: 138 km (86 mi)
- Discharge
  - location: mouth

The Chhimtuipui river, also known as the Chhimmtuipui Lui or Kaladan river, is a river of Mizoram, northeastern India. It flows in a southerly direction through Myanmar.

== Geography ==
The river is the biggest river in Mizoram by volume. It originates in western part of Myanmar from the Village of Vanum at an elevation of 2,325 metres (7,628 ft). It enters Mizoram near Sabawngte village from where it flows Northward for 138 kilometres (86 mi) till it meets Tiau river. From this point it flows northwest and meets Tuichawng river near Hnahthial and flows southwards where Mat river and Mengpui River meet.

== Hydro-electric project ==
The government of India is planning to construct a dam and hydro-electric project.

== Kaladan river route ==
This river is also part of the Kaladan Multi-Modal Transit Transport Project.

== See also ==
- Lungleng River
- East-West Industrial Corridor Highway, Arunachal Pradesh
- Arunachal Border Highway
- Asian Highway Network
- India-Myanmar-Thailand Friendship Highway
