= Hmawngbuchhuah =

- village
- Location within Mizoram Location within India
- Coordinates: 22°08′55″N 92°46′14″E
- Country: India
- State: Mizoram
- District: Lawngtlai district

Population (2011)
  - Total: 389

Languages
  - Official: Mizo
- Time zone: UTC+5:30 (IST)
- Vehicle registration: MZ
- Website: mizoram.nic.in

Hmawngbuchhuah is a village in Lawngtlai Block in the Lawngtlai district in the Indian state of Mizoram.

== Geography ==
It is sited 147 km from the state capital, Aizawl. It lies on the India-Myanmar border. It is 4 km South of the District headquarters Lawngtlai. where National Highway 502 (India), Kaladan Multi-Modal Transit Transport Project, enters Myanmar. It is on the east bank of Sekulh Lui River which forms the border.

== Demographics ==
As of the 2011 Census of India, the population in Hmawngbuchhuah village is 389, with 97 Households. There are 190 males (49%) and 199 females (51%), with 3% Scheduled Tribe and no Scheduled Caste.

== Economy ==
The mainstay of the economy is agriculture. It is also a border town with integrated check posts.

== Transport ==
223 km long "Aizawal-Hmawngbuchhuah railway line" was surveyed.

== See also ==
- Sittwe Port
- Zochachhuah
