= Involvement of Northeast Indian insurgents in the Myanmar conflict =

Spillover of the Northeast Indian insurgency in Myanmar
- Part of the Insurgency in Northeast India and the Myanmar conflict
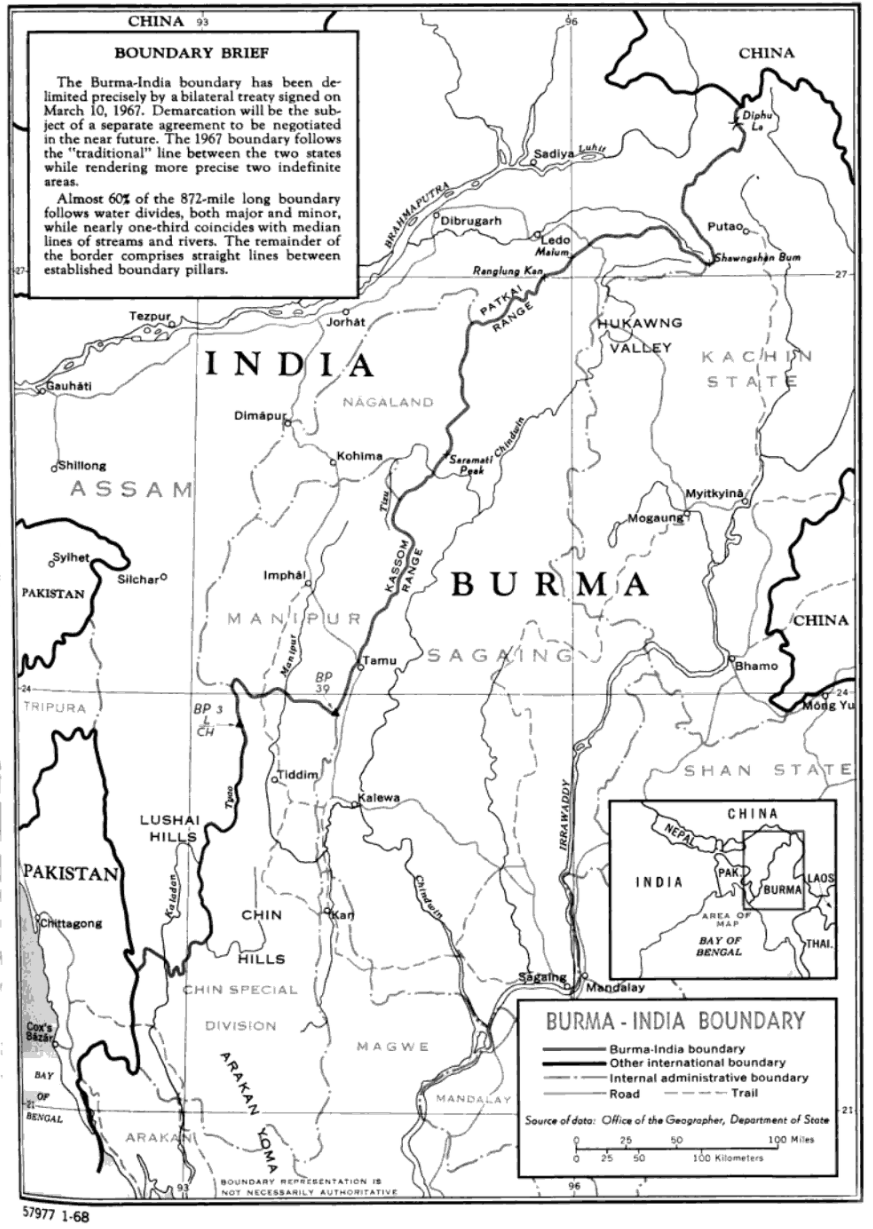
- Map of Northern Myanmar and Northeast India
Date	1950s–present
Location	India–Myanmar border

Throughout the long-running separatist insurgencies in Northeast India, dozens of India-based insurgent groups have been involved in the neighboring conflict in Myanmar, both sheltering in Myanmar from the counterinsurgent Assam Rifles and participating in the conflict itself. Outside of several Indian-led operations, including Operation Golden Bird in 1995, Operation Hot Pursuit in 2015, or Operation Sunrise I and II in 2019, areas in which these insurgent groups are active have scarcely experienced fighting. Amid the escalation of civil war in Myanmar from 2021, several sources claim that the majority of Indian ethnic armed organisations (IEAOs) are allied, or have some level of understanding, with the ruling military junta of Myanmar, who allows them to maintain bases inside mountainous areas of northern Myanmar, typically in return for the IEAOs attacking anti-junta resistance groups.

== History ==
=== Background ===
The Insurgency in Northeast India is the name for the collective insurgencies throughout the "seven sister states" making up Northeastern India. Starting shortly after the British withdrawal from India in 1947, the seven states have been subject to usually violent clashes between the Indian Army with the counterinsurgent and paramilitary Assam Rifles against dozens of secessionist groups. Over 200 tribal groups and subgroups live in the Northeast, with several having long-running historic rivalries.

Historically, the Northeastern states were controlled by the Kingdom of Ahom. From the 13th Century until the 19th Century, the states were ruled by the Ahom Dynasty (excluding Manipur, which was controlled by the Manipur Kingdom). This was until several internal rebellions which severely weakened the kingdom and the Burmese invasions of Assam, which lead Ahom to collapse and become occupied by the Konbaung dynasty. Shortly after, the Burmese had to cede the Northeast to the British East India Company after the First Anglo-Burmese War.

In 1947, after the British withdrawal from the India, several ethnic groups in the Northeast quickly revolted, starting when the Naga declared independence, and spreading to include Mizo, Assamese, Boro, Meitei, Tripuri, Zo/Kuki, and several other smaller ethnic groups.

=== 1950s-1990s ===
Indian-insurgents involvement in Myanmar (then called Burma) began in the 1950s when the leader of the successionist Naga National Council, Angami Zapu Phizo, encouraged the Naga people of Burma to join the separatist revolt. In response, Indian Prime Minister Jawaharlal Nehru sought to make Myanmar a neutral country so it would not arm the small Naga insurgency. Starting in 1956, Pakistan's Inter-Services Intelligence (ISI), China, and possibly the Yunnan-based Blackhouse mafia began supplying weaponry and aid to the Naga National Council, Mizo National Front, Sengkrak of Tripura, United Liberation Front of Asom, and later the People's Liberation Army of Manipur through Burma and Bhutan, with Naga insurgents receiving arms and training in East Pakistan (until 1971). Starting in the 1960s, tribal divisions began to impact the Naga insurgency. In 1962, a misunderstanding occurred in India-Myanmar relations which lead to Myanmar allowing Indian insurgents in its territory. In 1963, one of the largest Naga rebel columns, led by Dusoi Chakesang, traveled to East Pakistan through the Chin Hills. In January 1967, members of the Naga National Council traveled through Myanmar's Naga Hills to Yunnan in seeking Chinese backing for their cause, to which the Chinese would accept. In the later 1960s Indian Prime Minister Indira Gandhi began improving relations with Burmese dictator Ne Win, leading to the Tatmadaw agreeing to crack down on Naga and Mizo rebels heading to China for training.

==== Growth of the insurgency and Kachin Involvement ====
Starting in the late 1970s, several major insurgent groups -many of which are active in Myanmar- were founded. These include the:

- People's Revolutionary Party of Kangleipak (1977)
- People's Liberation Army of Manipur (1978)
- United Liberation Front of Asom (1979)
- National Socialist Council of Nagaland (1980)
- Kangleipak Communist Party (1980)
- National Democratic Front of Boroland (1986)
- National Liberation Front of Tripura (1989)
- All Tripura Tiger Force (1990)

In the mid-1980s, primarily due to its leader S. S. Khaplang, the National Socialist Council of Nagaland (NSCN) had established good relations with several Indian insurgent groups, with the NSCN allowing groups like the United Liberation Front of Asom (ULFA) and People's Liberation Army of Manipur (PLA-M) to maintain bases in north Sagaing Region. In 1985, China assisted the PLA-M in establishing relations with the Kachin State-based Kachin Independence Organisation and its army (KIA). The PLA-M was the first Indian rebel group to be trained and armed by the KIA. In 1987, through their bases in northern Sagaing, the ULFA sent the first cadres into KIA-controlled territory for training. A second batch of cadres were trained the next year. Eventually, 2,500 ULFA soldiers were trained by the KIA and the army was supplied with weapons primarily from Myanmar. The KIA and ULFA carried out several joint operations in Myanmar through this time. Both Naga and Mizo rebels also got training from the KIA and supplies from China, half of which they had to give to the KIA.

In 1989, the United National Liberation Front, National Socialist Council of Nagaland - Khaplang, United Liberation Front of Asom, and Kuki National Army, with aid from the Chin National Front, formed the Indo-Burma Revolutionary Front. The same year India's foreign intelligence agency, the Research and Analysis Wing (RAW), reached out to the KIA, Chin National Front, and several other Burmese insurgent groups to request that the armies would stop harbouring Indian militants in their territory. In return, the RAW would supply the groups with weapons through hideouts and caches in the seven sister states. It was reported that the KIA only received 2 consignments of weapons, far less than they expected. By 1992, the Burmese military discovered the supply routes between the KIA and India and quickly dismantled them. In winter of the same year, the KIA lost vast amounts of territories due to a Tatmadaw offensive, and the relations between the KIA and RAW began to break down. Despite this, the army kept its promise of not allowing Indian militants in its territory. The year after, the Tatmadaw and India began cooperating to attack Indian militants in Myanmar, with the Tatmadaw being supplied with Indian weapons.

=== India-Myanmar operations (1990s-2010s) ===
==== Operation Golden Bird ====
Operation Golden Bird was a 2 month long India-Myanmar joint military operation from March to May 1995. The goal of the operation was to cut off a weapon smuggling trail used by several Northeastern rebel groups to smuggle weapons into India's Manipur State. Cadres numbering around 170 of the United Liberation Front of Asom (ULFA), the People's Liberation Army of Manipur (PLA-M), and the All Tripura Tiger Force (ATTF) planned to pick up an arms shipment near Cox Bazar, Bangladesh, and transport it to Manipur. After the cadres accidentally crossed the India-Myanmar border in Chin State, they came into conflict with the Chin National Front (CNF), a Chin nationalist organisation. After reportedly clashing with the CNF, the CNF and the National United Party of Arakan (NUPA) began supplying the Indian Army with information about the movements of the cadres. After this, the Assam Rifles and the Myanmar military clashed with the cadres several times while they moved deeper into Burmese territory. Several times, discoordination led to both Myanmar Army and Indian Army troops requesting for the other to withdraw. By the end of April, the rebel column was severely weakened and demoralised.

On 4 May, India announced that the Jawaharlal Nehru Award for International Understanding was being given to Nobel Peace Prize winner and pro-democracy politician Aung San Suu Kyi. In response, the military junta of Myanmar withdrew from the front and released "scores" of detained militants, allowing the besieged rebel column to escape and eventually make it to Manipur. Operation Golden Bird ended 21 May 1995.

==== 1995-2015 ====
In mid-1995, the NSCN-K and ULFA formed the United Liberation Front of Seven Sisters, which broke up shortly after.

After 1997, Indian intelligence discontinued all support to Burmese rebels -including the Kachin Independence Organisation, Chin National Front, and National United Party of Arakan- and began supplying the Burmese military with heavy weaponry. In return, the Burmese Army started attacking Naga rebel bases, but the army avoided Assamese and Manipuri rebels. In November 2001, in a military operation conducted by the Burmese military, 192 Manipuri rebels were captured, including UNLF chairman Rajkumar Meghen, and around 1,600 weapons were seized around Tamu. The Burmese military refused to hand over the rebels to India. B.B. Nandy, a Myanmar rights activist based in India, claimed that "the Tatmadaw don't attack the powerful Manipuri or Assamese guerrillas who pay off the generals." Despite this, India resumed arms shipments to Myanmar the next year despite protests from the European Union. In September 2006, Indian officials greeted a Burmese delegation by submitting to them a list of 15 Indian insurgent bases in Myanmar. Afterwards, during the following monsoon season, the Tatmadaw attacked several Naga and Assamese bases. After the violent suppression of the 2007 Saffron Revolution by the Tatmadaw, India suspended all arms sales to Myanmar.

In July 2011, several Myanmar-based insurgent groups -those being the Kangleipak Communist Party, Kanglei Yawol Kanna Lup, People's Revolutionary Party of Kangleipak, People's Liberation Army of Manipur, United National Liberation Front, and United Peoples Party of Kangleipak- formed a united front called the Coordination Committee (CorCom) after a meeting in Ruili, China. Leaders from the NSCN-K and ULFA also attended the meeting. Chinese officials supported the formation of the front, promised to provide weapons and logistics to the front in return for them destabilising Arunachal Pradesh, which China claims as its own territory.

Sometime in 2013, the Zomi Revolutionary Army (ZRA), the military wing of the Zomi Re-Unification Organisation, established a presence in Chin State.

On 27 March 2015, the NSCN-K abrogated the ceasefire with the Indian government it had held since 2001, possibly under the influence of Chinese officials. A month later, on 17 April, the NSCN-K, ULFA, NDFB-S, and KLO formed a united front under the name of the United National Liberation Front of Western South East Asia (UNLFWSEA or UNLFW) after a series of meetings in Taga, Myanmar, which would become the group's main base of operations. Members of the Coordination Committee participated in the meetings, but did not join the front due to disagreements. On 3 May, the front ambushed the 23 Assam Rifles battalion and 164 Territorial Army Battalion of the Indian Army in Mon District of Nagaland, killing 8.

=== Post-Coup resurgence (2021-present) ===
==== Anti-Junta rebels ====
The Kuki National Army and the People's Defense Force conducted a joint raid on a United National Liberation Front encampment in Tamu Township on 23 November 2023.

==== Pro-Junta rebels ====
Meitei rebel groups such as the People's Liberation Army of Manipur were involved in aiding the Myanmar military junta in cracking down on protests and fighting the PDF.

The Zomi Revolutionary Army frequently clashes with the Chinland Defense Force, with alleged aid by the military junta. While the ZRA denied allegations of direct aid from the Tatmadaw, they confirmed that they are not against them as "They do not attack us and neither do we." Eventually, the ZRA signed a peace treaty with the Chin National Army, but still officially remain neutral with the military junta.

The National Socialist Council of Nagaland accused the Indian government of supplying bomb-making materials to the Kuki National Army-Burma and supporting the PDF.

=== 2025 ===
On 13 July, media reports claimed that India launched drone and airstrikes against insurgent camps in Myanmar, targeting ULFA positions near the Indo-Myanmar border in Arunachal Pradesh. The ULFA alleged that these strikes resulted in the death of Lieutenant General Nayam Asom. During his funeral, a subsequent missile attack reportedly killed Brigadier Ganesh Asom, Colonel Pradip Asom, and others. The ULFA accused the Indian Air Force of targeting camps belonging to the NSCN-K and PLA in the region. However, Indian Army officials, including Colonel Mahendra Rawat, denied any knowledge of the strikes.

On 14 July, ULFA's commander-in-chief Paresh Baruah contradicted initial reports, stating that Colonel Pradip Asom, previously thought dead, had survived the attack. Assam Chief Minister Himanta Biswa Sarma clarified that the state police had no involvement in the drone strikes. Later in January 2026, India confirmed that Indian forces conducted strikes into the region, during the presentation of gallantry awards for successful execution of the strikes.

=== 2026 ===
Throughout January 2026, Naga factions NSCN-Yung Aung and NSCN-Ang Mai clashed several times in the Naga Self-Administered Zone over disputes regarding territory and legitimacy.
