= Kaladan Multi-Modal Transit Transport Project =

Connection of seaports in India and Myanmar

Route map of the transport project

The Kaladan Road Project (Burmese: ကုလားတန်မြစ်ကြောင်း ဘက်စုံဖွံ့ဖြိုးရေး စီမံကိန်း) is an international transport project connecting the eastern Indian seaport of Kolkata with Sittwe seaport in Rakhine State, Myanmar by sea. In Myanmar, it will then link Sittwe seaport to Paletwa in Chin State via the Kaladan river boat route, and then from Paletwa by road to Mizoram state in Northeast India. All components of the project, including Sittwe port and power, river dredging, and Paletwa jetty, have been completed, except the under construction Zorinpui-Paletwa road. Originally, the project was scheduled to be completed by 2014; after this deadline was missed, the project was expected to be fully operational by December 2023. With further delays, according to India and Mizoram government, the entire project would be operational by 2027.

== History ==
This project will reduce the distance from Kolkata to Sittwe by approximately 1,328 km (825 mi) and will reduce the need to transport goods through the narrow Siliguri corridor, also known as Chicken's Neck.

Initially India had tried to persuade Bangladesh to offer transport and transit rights to the northeastern states. However, Bangladesh has consistently refused to grant such rights, including access to its Chittagong port, which is less than 200 km (120 mi) away from Agartala, the capital of Tripura.

The project is being piloted and funded by the Ministry of External Affairs (India). The preliminary feasibility studies were carried out by Rail India Technical and Economic Services (RITES). Construction work on Sittwe port and the boat jetty in Paletwa, as well as the dredging work, will be executed by the Inland Waterways Authority of India (IWAI), with Essar Projects Ltd, a division of the Essar Group appointed in May 2010 as the main contractor.

Kaladan Multi-Modal Transit Transport Project initially faced problems such as underestimation of the road length in Myanmar and plans to construct hydro-electric projects — Chhimtuipui River and Lungleng River — on two tributaries of the Kaladan River followed by another project downstream. That the first two projects are being built by one public sector undertaking and the third is being constructed by another PSU (Public Sector Unit) has also led to coordination issues. Due to construction of this hydro electrical projects, navigation of boats could be effected.

In April 2017, the Sittwe port and IWT Paletwa jetty were ready and operational. In April 2017, India handed over the operation of completed Sittwe port and Inland Water Terminal at Paletwa to Myanmar. In June 2017, India handed six gas tanker cargo vessels worth US$81.29 million (K110.08 billion) to the Myanmar government to transport gas to north-east India via Manipur. Work on the port in Sittwe and the IWT in Paletwa, Chin State, is in its final stages, and the six cargo vessels are meant to facilitate transportation of goods from Sittwe to Paletwa. The $81.29 million cost of the vessels was met through a grant from India. The construction work was assigned to IWT in October 2012, the keels were laid in March 2013 and the vessels were launched between April and December 2016. On completion of the tests and trials at Yangon, the vessels reached Sittwe in March 2017. Acceptance trials were completed in April 2017 in Sittwe.

In June 2017, after several upward budget revisions and troubles in finding contractors, the INR1,600-crore (US$250 million) contract has been finally awarded to an Indian company C&C construction for building 109-km road connecting IWT Paletwa river terminal to Zorinpui in Mizoram border. The contractor would open offices at Sittwe, Paletwa and Yangon in Myanmar, mobilise men and machine during the monsoon and start construction after the monsoon in October.

In 2019, India and Myanmar launched Operation Sunrise, a joint military effort to dismantle insurgent group camps, especially the Arakan Army, threatening the Kaladan Project.

As of 2026, the project which passes through the areas of Paletwa, Pauktaw, Ponnagyun Kyauktaw, and Mrauk-U townships, are controlled by the Arakan Army. A small area of jetty in Sittwe remains under the control of the military council.

India plans to open the Kaladan project by 2027, as announced by Minister of Ports and Shipping Sarbananda Sonowal in July 2027.

== Route ==
=== Sea–river–road route ===
The project has several sections combining multi-modes of transport:

- Kolkata-Sittwe shipping route - 539 km (335 mi) from seaport of Kolkata in India to Sittwe seaport in Myanmar via Bay of Bengal. This sea route has been operational for several decades. Port upgrade, from 20,000 ton vessels to 40,000 ton capacity vessels, has been completed.
- Sittwe seaport to Paletwa inland jettyriver boat route - 158 km (98 mi)' from Sittwe seaport to Inland Water Terminal (IWT) and hydro power project at Paletwa jetty via Kaladan river in Myanmar. River dredging and jetty upgrade completed in June 2017. There is at least one river lock for navigation. Six barges of 300 ton capacity each were handed over to Myanmar by the government of India. Completed.
  Sittwe Special Economic Zone at Ponnagyun town 60 kilometres (37 mi) north from Sittwe upstream of Kaladan River at Ponnagyun town is being built by India on 1000 acres.
- Paletwa inland jetty to Zorinpui road 2-lane container-load-grade route in Myanmar - 108 km (67 mi) two-lane in each direction (4 lanes total) road route from IWT Paletwa to Zochawchhuah(India)–Zorinpui (Myanmar) at Indo-Myanmar border in Myanmar. Construction contract of INR1600 crore (16 billion) was awarded to Ircon in June 2017, and construction commenced in April 2018, after all the necessary approvals were granted by the Myanmar govt in January 2018. Integrated Customs & Immigration Checkpost at Zochawchhuah-Zorinpui has been operational since 2017.
  - Package-I: Paletwa inland jetty to Kaletwa road route in Myanmar - 67 km (42 mi) is Complete as per March 2024 update.
  - Package-II: Kaletwa to Zorinpui road route in Myanmar - 48.5 km (30.1 mi) is under construction as per March 2024 update, militants in control of the area have assured cooperation and security for the completion of the road.
- Zorinpui to Aizawl road 2-lane container-load-grade route in India - 110 km (68 mi) from Indo-Myanmar border at Zorinpui to Aizawl. From Aizawl it connect to Aizawl-Saiha National Highway at Lawngtlai in Mizoram, India by road on National Highway 54 (India) (NH-54), which then continues further to Dabaka in Assam via 850 km (530 mi) long NH-54 which in turn is part of the larger East–West Corridor connecting North East India with the rest of India. Complete as per March 2024 update.
  Note: The 90 km (56 mi) 2-lane route from Indo-Myanmar border at Zochawchhuah-Zorinpui to Tuipang is complete. From Tuipang, the national highway was further upgraded from 2-lane to all-weather 4-lane from NH 54 Lawngtlai to Aizawl in Mizoram. INR6000 crore (60 billion) was approved to further improve this Zochawchhuah–Zorinpui–Aizawl national highway. Lomasu to Lawngtlai is a two-lane highway in each direction (total four lanes) and Lawngtlai to Aizawl–Guwahati national highway was widened to 4 lanes in each direction (total 8 lanes).
- Shillong–Silchar High-Speed Corridor - 166.8 km (103.6 mi), from Mawlyngkhung near Shillong to Panchgram on NH-6 near Silchar, will cut travel time between the two cities from 8.5 hours to 5 hours and act as a continuation of Kaladan multi-modal transport project offering a new Rs 22,864 crore high-speed highway between the North-East and Kolkata bypassing Bangladesh, executed by the National Highways and Infrastructure Development Corporation Limited (NHIDCL) and expected to be completed by 2030.

=== Complementary railway route ===
This railway route will complement the river–road route of this project in Myanmar-Mizoram:

- Sittwe–Kyauktaw railway in Myanmar, 90 km (56 mi) – exists and operational: This route has been operational since 2011. To integrate with other routes-network in Myanmar, it will be further extended 311 km by 2021–22, from Kyauktaw in north to Ann in south and then south-east to Minbu where it will connect to Myanmar rail network as well as 1,215 km (755 mi) long Kyaukpyu port–Minbu–Kunming high-speed railway being planned by China.
- Kyauktaw–Zorinpui in Myanmar, 200 km (120 mi) – planned but not yet surveyed: India has future yet-unapproved plans to fund and construct this missing link.
- Zochawchhuah (Zorinpui)–Sairang railway in India, 375 km (233 mi) – being surveyed since Aug-2017: Survey for the rail line from Sairang (Aizawl) to Hmawngbuchhuah on border near Zochawchhuah–Zorinpui was completed in August 2017 and it will be constructed in future phase.

=== Other projects – alternate route to northeast India ===
Compared to the 1,880 km (1,170 mi) long, congested "Chicken's Neck" Siliguri Corridor, this Kaladan project will almost half the distance to a mere 950 km (590 mi). As an alternate route (unrelated to the Kaladan Multi-Modal project) to northeast India, India is also developing railway route from Cox's Bazar deep water port to South Tripura district by rehabilitating the railway link from Santirbazar in India to Feni in Bangladesh, where a road and rail bridge is being built to connect the "Belonia, India–Parshuram, Bangladesh road and rail crossing checkposts", this will reduce traffic through Sittwe, but will provide strategically redundancy if there is a war with China.

== Travel arrangements ==
=== Zorinpui border crossing and visa arrangements ===
Integrated Customs & Immigration Checkpost at Zorinpui in Lawngtlai district, is already operational since 2017. In early 2018, visa agreement were signed for the citizens of two nations to travel by road for education, medical assistance, tourism and other purposes. This agreement was operationalised on 9 August 2018. Indians and Myanma citizens with valid passport and visa can pass through two official Land Border Crossings at Moreh in Manipur (Tamu in Sagaing Region of Myanmar) and Zokhawthar in Mizoram (Rihkhawdar in Chin State of Myanmar).

=== Motor Vehicle Agreement ===
In 2015, India proposed a trilateral Motor Vehicle Agreement to facilitate seamless movement of passenger and cargo vehicles among the three countries. In May 2017, during a visit by Thai officials to Manipur, the state's Chief Secretary Oinam Nabakishore declared that the draft of the trilateral agreement had already been prepared. As of May 2018, the signing of Motor vehicle agreement is still pending.

== Related projects ==
Myanmar is key part of India's "Look East" policy and Kaladan project has enabled several other associated projects with ongoing development of growing list of integrated linkages.

=== Commerce and trade ===
==== Sittwe Special Economic Zone ====
Sittwe Special Economic Zone (Sittwe SEZ) at Ponnagyun town was announced by India's Union Minister of State for External Affairs V K Singh at the India-ASEAN Foreign Ministers meet at Laos in August 2016. The 1000 acre SEZ will be built 60 kilometres (37 mi) north from Sittwe upstream of Kaladan River at Ponnagyun town. China is building a rival Kyaukpyu Special Economic Zone and port 80 kilometres (50 mi) south of Sittwe.

=== Energy ===
==== Thathay Chaung Hydropower Project ====
Thathay Chaung Hydropower Project(TCHP) is an 1800 megawatt, two dam project being built and financed by India on Chindwin River in Rakhine State of Myanmar, a 1,200 megawatt dam at Thamanthi (Manthi) and 600 megawatt dam at Shwejaye. The electricity produced will be supplied to Manipur state of India.

==== Sittwe–Gaya gas pipeline ====
There is also to a proposal to build 1,575 km (979 mi) long Sittwe–Aizawl–Silchar–Guwahati–Siliguri–Gaya gas pipeline to transport gas from Sittwe gas field where ONGC and GAIL hold 30 percent stake in oil and gas exploration.

=== Highways ===
==== Agartala–Feni–Chittagong Highway ====
Indian has decided to build an INR130 crore (US$20 million) bridge over the Feni River at the Tripura-Bangladesh border to connect the existing NH8 Agartala–Sabroom on Indian side to Chittagong port in Bangladesh 80 km (50 mi) from South Tripura. In February 2017, the project was in tendering stage.

==== Aizawl–Tuipang National Highway 4-laning ====
In June 2017, to ensure faster movement of goods between Sittwe and Mizoram capital of Aizawl in the North West which is close to the Barak Valley of Assam, India started an INR6,000-crore upgrade of current 2-lane 300 km (190 mi) Aizawl–Tuipang national highway to all-weather four-laning of international standard, the tender will be floated in September and construction contract will be awarded by December 2017 after the ongoing land acquisition is complete. The upgrade of 52-km long road from Tuipang to Myanmar border, from 2-lane to all-weather 4-lane highway, is also included in this 352 km (219 mi) long National Highways & Infrastructure Development Corporation Limited (NHIDCL) project.

==== India–Myanmar–Thailand Trilateral Highway ====
The India–Myanmar–Thailand (IMT) Trilateral Highway (Friendship Highway) is a highway under construction that will connect Moreh, India with Mae Sot, Thailand via Myanmar. The road is expected to boost trade and commerce in the ASEAN–India Free Trade Area, as well as with the rest of Southeast Asia. India has also proposed extending the highway to Cambodia, Laos and Vietnam. The proposed approx 3,200 km (2,000 mi) route from India to Vietnam is known as the East-West Economic Corridor (EWEC).

==== Paletwa–Cikha–India Highway ====
Paletwa–Cikha–India Highway Project is a INR 20 billion (US$315 million) 645 km (401 mi) long under construction Paletwa–Cikha road highway in Chin State of Myanmar, which will also be connected to the Indian border on two places, Paletwa to NH502 Zochachhuah border village of Lawngtlai district in south-most Mizoram (main road route of Kaladan Multi-modal Transit Transport project) and at Khenman (Myanmar) to NH102B Behiang border village of Churachandpur district in southernmost Manipur. On 21 April 2016, Chin State Chief Minister Pu Lian Luai in Myanmar informed that the project is funded by Indian government, which will connect Paletwa in southern Chin state to Cikha (also misspelt as Chikha in Indian media) sub-town in northern Chin state. New roads will also be built to connect the Paletwa-Chikha highway to villages and towns in Chin state.

==== Zokhawthar–Rihkhawdar–Kalemyo Highway ====
India–Myanmar Zokhawthar–Rihkhawdar–Kalemyo Highway will provide second connection to the India–Myanmar–Thailand Trilateral Highway (IMT), between NH102B Zokhawthar Indian border village of Champhai district in east Mizoram to Rihkhawdar border town in Myanmar, connecting it to IMT 120 km (75 mi) away at Kalemyo, where it will connect to the IMT at Kalemyo.

=== Railway ===
==== Bairabi-Sairang-Hmawngbuchhuah railway ====
Indian Railways has already converted to broad gauge the current 84 km (52 mi) rail line from Katakhal (Assam) to Bairabi 2 km (1.2 mi) inside Mizoram. Its further 51.38 km (31.93 mi) Bairabi Sairang Railway extension from Bairabi to Sairang (20 km (12 mi) north of Aizawl) in Mizoram is under construction with target completion date of March 2019 as per status update in March 2016. In August 2015, India railway completed a survey for a possible new route extension from Sairang to Hmawngbuchhuah on Mizoram's southern tip on the border of Myanmar, where at nearby Zochachhuah village the National Highway 502 (part of Kaladan Multi-Modal Transit Transport Project) enters Myanmar, leaving a possibility open for yet-unplanned future rail connections to Paletwa.

== Present status ==
As of February 2026, the entire project would be operational by 2027. Sitwee Port and Paletwa Inland Jetty are under the operational control of Indian contractor. But, since early 2024, the rest of route within Myanmar including completed 67 km long container-grade heavy-load-bearing 2-lane Paletwa-Kaletwa Road is under the control of Arakan Army (AA), which has established checkpoints to tax commercial traffic (approximately 5% tax) moving food and fuel between Mizoram and Chin State. On the remaining 42.5 km long container-grade heavy-load-bearing 2-lane Kaletwa-Zorinpui Road to the Indian border the earthwork and primary clearing have been completed, bridge work and final bituminous (black-topping) surfacing were disrupted due to the civil war in Myanmar. AA is allowing work to proceed slowly under their oversight, as they view the corridor as a "taxable" economic lifeline for their administration. In its current state, some parts remain primitive or gravel-based during the monsoon season.

== See also ==
Nearby major port projects

- Sabang strategic port development, India-Indonesia project
- Dawei Port Project in Myanmar

International-regional projects

- India's International connectivity projects
- India's Northeast Connectivity projects
- BIMSTEC projects
- Mekong-Ganga Cooperation
- India–Myanmar–Thailand Trilateral Highway
- Asian Highway Network
- India–Myanmar barrier
