= Katakhal =

- village
- Location in Assam, India Katakhal (India)
- Coordinates: 24.8309°N 92.6143°E
- Country: India
- State: Assam
- District: Hailakandi
- District created: 1 October 1989

Government
  - Body: Hailakandi Municipality Board

Area
  - Total: 1,327 km^{2} (512 sq mi)
  - Rank: hhh
- Elevation: 21 m (69 ft)

Population (2011)
  - Total: 659,260
  - Density: 497/km^{2} (1,290/sq mi)

Languages
  - Official: Bengali and Meitei (Manipuri)
- Time zone: UTC+5:30 (IST)
- PIN: 788XXX
- Telephone code: 91 - (0) 03844
- ISO 3166 code: IN-AS
- Vehicle registration: AS-24
- Website: hailakandi.nic.in

Katakhal is a town and railway station in Hailakandi tehsil of Hailakandi district in the Indian state of Assam. The village is named after the Katakhal River which originates in Bhairabi after three other rivers merge. The river ends at Kalinagar Village falling into Barak river. The Hailakandi district is one of the three districts of Southern Assam in the Barak Valley.

Bengali and Meitei (Manipuri) are the official languages of this place.

== Bairabi Sairang Railway ==
Indian Railways has already converted the current 84 km railway from Assam to Bairabi 2 km inside Mizoram. Its 51.38 km long Bairabi Sairang Railway extension from Bairabi to Sairang (20 km north of Aizawl) in Mizoram is under construction with target completion date of March 2019. In August 2015, Indian Railway completed a survey for a possible new route extension from Sairang to Hmawngbuchhuah on Mizoram's southern tip on the border of Myanmar, where at nearby Zochachhuah village the National Highway 502 (India) (part of Kaladan Multi-Modal Transit Transport Project) enters Myanmar, leaving a possibility open for yet-unplanned future rail connections to Paletwa.
