= Sai Din Waterfall =

Waterfall in Rakhine State, Myanmar

Sai Din waterfall
- စိုင်းတင်ရေတံခွန်
- Location within Myanmar
- Location: Buthidaung Township, Rakhine State, Myanmar
- Coordinates: 21.056889°N 92.601278°E
- Type: waterfall
- Elevation: 500 ft (150 m)
- Total height: 70 ft (21 m)
- Average width: 700 ft (210 m)

Sai Din Waterfall (Burmese: စိုင်းတင်ရေတံခွန်) is the largest and highest waterfall in Rakhine State, Myanmar. It is located in the Mayu area of Buthidaung Township. It is roughly from 10 to 15 miles northeast of Buthidaung town and about 50 miles north of Sittwe.

== History ==
Historically, the area around the waterfall was once home to an ancient city called Sai Din. According to Rakhine chronicles, there were 99 cities on each side of the Kaladan River. Sit Tan Tin was one of those cities. There are reported to be several oral traditions connected to Sai Din. According to local oral story tells of a queen who was abducted by a crocodile living in the area. Another legend describes a king who ruled Zambudip Island and while searching for immortality in the Sai Din Mountains, he cut off the queen's neck.

The name "Sai Din" has changed several times throughout history. Earlier it was called or spelled as "Sit Tan Tin", "Sein Tin" and "See Tin" before eventually becoming Sai Din. According to local understanding, the current name likely evolved from "Sit Tan Tin" which refers to the water flowing from Sit Creek above the Sai Din Mountains.

There were plans to develop a hydropower project at the waterfall. However, the project was never completed as it was halted by the Myanmar government. The Sai Tin Hydropower Project was first launched in 1954 during the government of Prime Minister U Nu as part of the Pyidaw Thar development program. However, the project collapsed in 1957 after two German engineers working on it were killed by an armed group in the jungle. After the 1988 military takeover, and also in Thein Sein's government, the Sai Tin project was repeatedly revived with promises of electrifying Rakhine State, but each attempt failed.

In March 2021, garbage bins were placed near the waterfall to keep it garbage free. On December that year, it was urged for local ecosystem must be protected by disposing of garbage properly to prevent damage of the waterfall, as growing numbers of tourists and holiday visitors are increasing.

== Features ==
The waterfall is approximately 70 feet high and stretches about 700 feet across. It flows through broken rocks between two mountain ranges that are about 500 feet high. Its catchment area is roughly 30 miles in length and 15 miles in width reaching as far as the northern border of Bangladesh. The waterfall features seven distinct tiers.

The area of waterfall is an underdeveloped area. There is no phone or internet signal around the waterfall.
