= India–Myanmar relations =

- India: Myanmar

Diplomatic mission
- High Commission of Myanmar, New Delhi: Embassy of India, Yangon

Envoy
- High Commissioner Moe Kyaw Aung: Ambassador Vinay Kumar

India–Myanmar relations, also known as the Indo–Burmese relations, are the bilateral relations between the Republic of India and the Republic of the Union of Myanmar. These relations encompass the political, economic and socio-cultural relations that exist between the two neighbouring Asian countries. Political relations have improved considerably since 1993, overcoming tensions related to drug trafficking, the suppression of democracy and the rule of the military junta in Myanmar. Political leaders from both countries meet regularly on a bilateral basis and within the ASEAN Plus Six community. Economic relations are considerable with India representing Myanmar's 4th largest export market and the country's 5th largest import partner.

The 1,600 km (990 mi) India–Myanmar border separates the Indian states of Mizoram, Manipur, Nagaland and Arunachal Pradesh in Northeast India from Kachin State, Sagaing Region and Chin State in Myanmar/Burma. In addition to the long land border, India and Myanmar also share a maritime border along India's Andaman Islands.

== History ==
India–Burma relations
- India: Burma

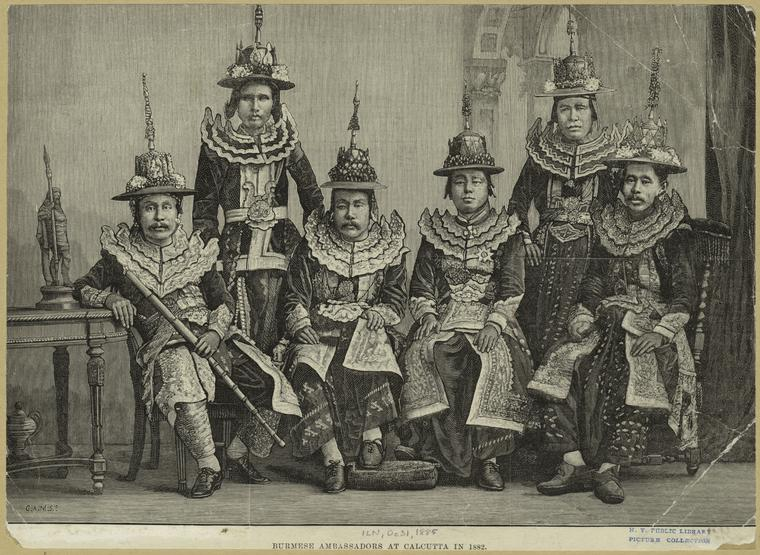
Burmese ambassadors at Calcutta in 1882

India–Myanmar/Burmese relations date to antiquity and cultural exchanges included Buddhism and the Burmese script, which was based on the Indian Grantha script. In particular, Theravada Buddhism has tremendously influenced Burmese society and culture for millennia, with around 90% of Burma's population continuing to follow the religion. The Dhammasattha, pre-colonial Burma's primary legal source, was significantly modelled on Indian concepts of law and the ancient Manusmriti text. Starting from the Bagan Dynasty in the 11th century, Burma became integrated into the Indian Ocean trade network with the Kingdom of Pegu having many Indian traders and goods, among others.

The Taungoo Dynasty of Burma engaged in several wars with Manipur in the 18th century and subsequently controlled parts of modern-day India. The Meiteis from Manipur, introduced polo and hockey in the Burmese court. They introduced the science of astrology to the Burmese and the rest of the South East Asians. When Burmese King Alaungpaya invaded Siam, he had 500 Manipuri (Meitei) horsemen with him. Meitei Brahmins worked as astrologers and priests for the Burmese royalties.

In the early 19th century, the Konbaung Dynasty fought three wars with the British Empire. The First Anglo-Burmese War began primarily over the control of what is now Northeastern India and ended in a costly but decisive British victory, giving the British total control of Assam, Cachar, Manipur and Jaintia which had formerly been under Konbaung control. The British would conquer the rest of Burma by 1885. Indian troops, who made up the vast majority of the British forces, were the primary troops used by the British Empire to conquer Burma.

Burma was made a province of British India in 1886. In 1937, the Burma Province was separated from British India and made a distinct colony. It was in Japanese-occupied Burma that Indian nationalist Subhas Chandra Bose delivered his "Give me blood and I will give you freedom!" slogan, and Prime Minister Narendra Modi highlighted Burma's role in the Indian independence movement.

India–Burma relations

- India: Burma

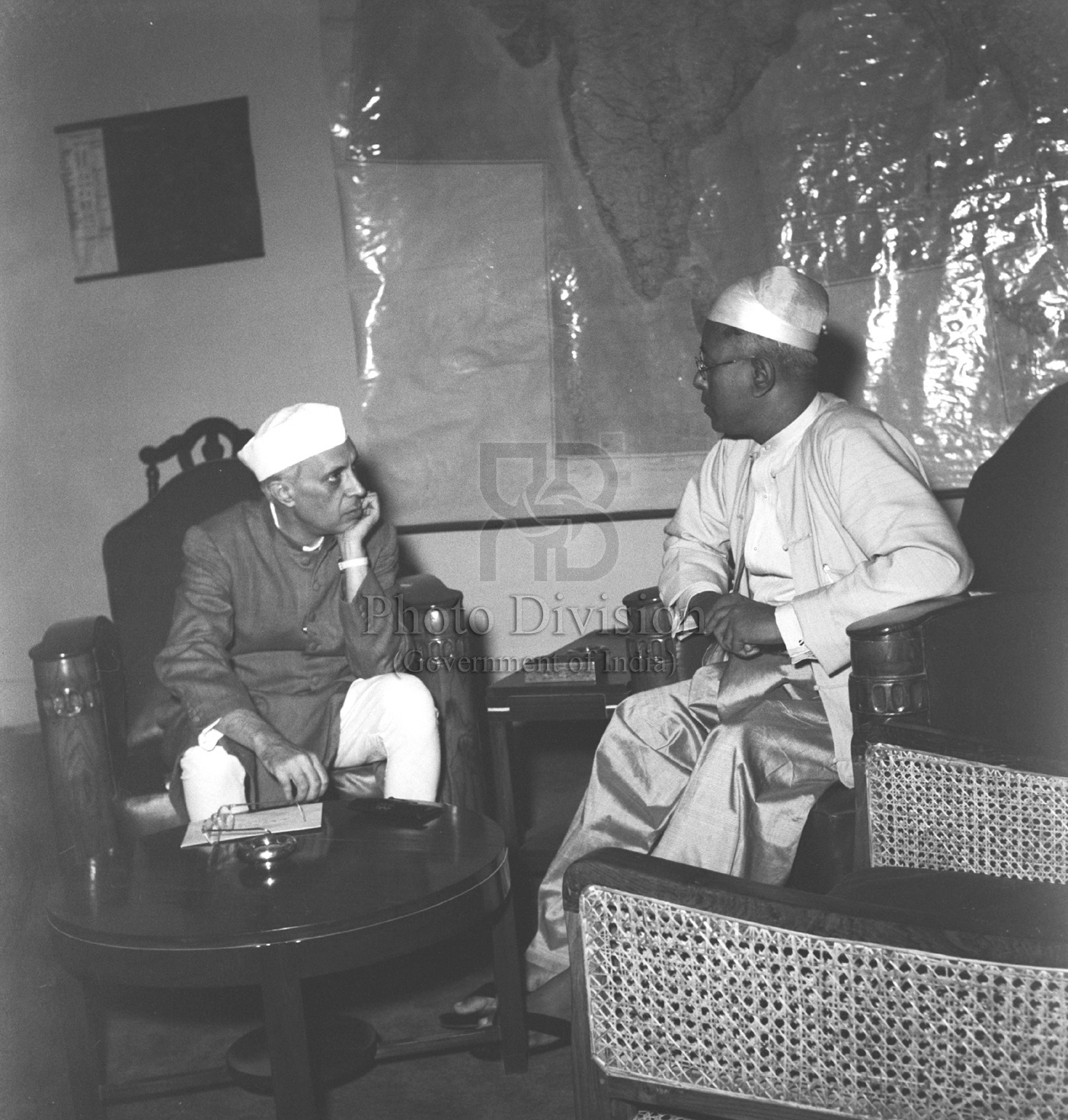
Jawaharlal Nehru with U Win, Burmese High Commissioner in India, on October 23, 1947.

=== Post-independence ===
India established diplomatic relations after Myanmar's independence from Britain in 1948. For many years, Indo-Burmese relations were strong due to Myanmar previously having been a province of India, due to cultural links, flourishing commerce, common interests in regional affairs and the presence of a significant Indian community in Myanmar. India provided considerable support when Myanmar struggled with ethnic insurgencies. However, the 1962 overthrow of the democratic government by the Military of Myanmar led to strains in ties. Along with much of the world, India condemned the suppression of democracy and Myanmar ordered the expulsion of the Burmese Indian community, increasing its own isolation from the world.

A major breakthrough occurred in 1987 when the then-Indian Prime Minister Rajiv Gandhi visited Myanmar but relations worsened after the military junta's crackdown on pro-democracy movements in 1988, which resulted in an influx of Burmese refugees into India. Only China maintained close links with Myanmar during this time, while India supported the pro-democracy movement.

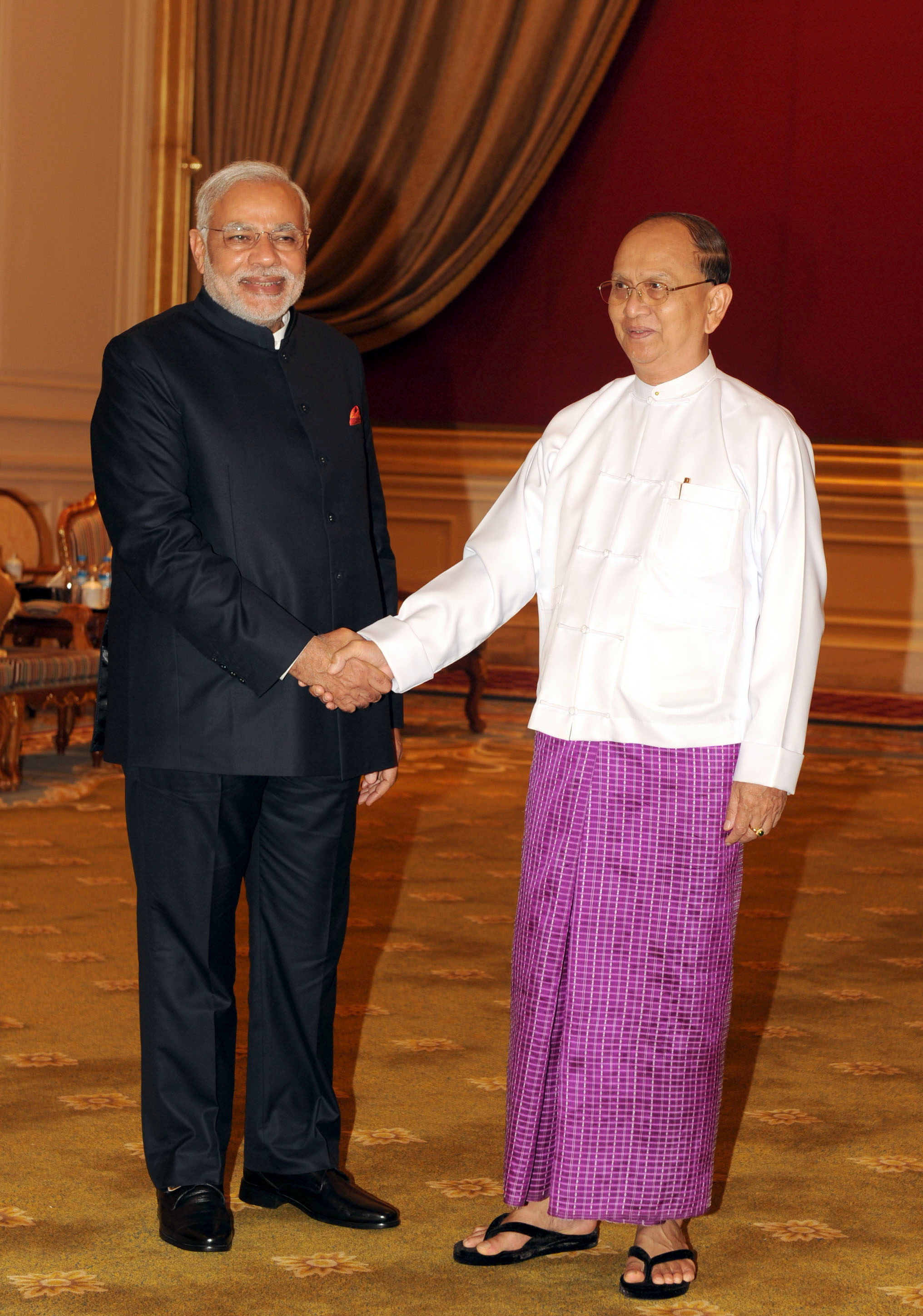
Prime Minister Narendra Modi and Myanmar President Thein Sein, 2014

The open support deteriorated their bilateral relations, worsening when India accepted student activist refugees along their border. It was also reported that India provided some assistance to the Kachin Independence Organisation and the Karen National Union during this time.

However, the hostility reversed course from strategic geopolitical considerations and increasing security concerns about insurgents along the India-Myanmar border. Indian Prime Ministers P. V. Narasimha Rao's Look East policy led to India toning down its ideological support for Myanmar's opposition in light of China's increasing influence over Myanmar. The two countries signed a Common Border Trade Agreement in 1994 and launched joint operations against ethnic insurgents including the 1995 Operation Golden Bird. The cooperation on the military operation faltered after the awarding of the Jawaharlal Nehru Award to oppostion leader Aung San Suu Kyi in 1995. In the late 1990s, Prime Minister Atal Bihari Vajpayee undertook more initiatives to keep ties and cooperate with the military government. This led to the opening of a new Indian consulate in Mandalay in 2002 and the incorporation of Myanmar in various regional groups like the Bay of Bengal Initiative for Multi-Sectoral Technical and Economic Cooperation (BIMSTEC) and the Mekong–Ganga Cooperation project.

In September 2024, the Indian Council of World Affairs invited representatives of the National Unity Government of Myanmar, Arakan Army, Chin National Front, and Kachin Independence Organization to participate in a mid-November seminar on "Constitutionalism and Federalism.". India also took part in the Wilmington Declaration with Japan, the United States, and Australia to discourage the flow of jet fuel and other military items to the junta.

Following the 2025 Myanmar earthquake, the State Administration Council junta selectively accepted aid from its perceived allies, including India, to bolster its international legitimacy. In 2026, India hosted former junta leader Min Aung Hlaing for a foreign visit to Delhi. Although it was officially classified as an official visit, the visit had all the elements of a state visit. The visit was critcised for legitimising Myanmar's new government after the 2025 Myanmar general election, which were widely not seen as free and fair.

== Economic relations ==
India is Burma's 4th largest trading partner after Thailand, China and Singapore, and second largest export market after Thailand, absorbing 25 percent of its total exports. India is also the seventh most important source of Burma's imports. The governments of India and Myanmar had set a target of achieving $1 billion and bilateral trade reached US$1.3 billion by 2017. The Indian government has worked to extend air, land and sea routes to strengthen trade links with Myanmar and establish a gas pipeline. While the involvement of India's private sector has been low and growing at a slow pace, both governments are proceeding to enhance cooperation in agriculture, telecommunications, information technology, steel, oil, natural gas, hydrocarbons and food processing. The bilateral border trade agreement of 1994 provides for border trade to be carried out from three designated border points, one each in Manipur, Mizoram and Nagaland.

=== Infrastructure initiatives ===
On 13 February 2001 India and Myanmar inaugurated 250 kilometre Tamu-Kalewa-Kalemyo highway, popularly called the Indo-Myanmar Friendship Road, built mainly by the Indian Army's Border Roads Organisation and aimed to provide a major strategic and commercial transport route connecting North-East India, and South Asia as a whole, to Southeast Asia.

==== India-Myanmar-Thailand Friendship Highway ====
India and Myanmar have agreed to a 4-lane, 3200 km triangular highway connecting India, Myanmar and Thailand. The route, which is expected to have completed during 2016, runs from India's northeastern states into Myanmar, where over 1,600 km of roads were built or improved.

The route begins from Guwahati in India and connects to Mandalay in Myanmar, route continues to Yangon in Myanmar and then to Mae Sot in Thailand, which then continues to Bangkok.

India is undertaking two sections of the Trilateral Highway namely, (i) construction of Kalewa-Yagyi road section in Myanmar, and (ii) construction of 69 bridges on the Tamu-Kyigone-Kalewa (TKK) road section in Myanmar. The work on both these sections has been awarded on Engineering, Procurement and Construction mode and is underway since May 2018 for Kalewa-Yagyi section and November 2017 for the TKK section.

The first phase connecting Guwahati to Mandalay will eventually be extended to Cambodia and Vietnam under Mekong-Ganga Cooperation within the wider framework of Asian Highway Network. This is aimed at creating a new economic zone ranging from Kolkata on the Bay of Bengal to Ho Chi Minh City on the South China Sea.

==== Kaladan Multi-modal Transit Route ====
The Kaladan Multi-Modal Transit Transport Project will connect the eastern Indian seaport of Kolkata with Sittwe seaport in Myanmar by sea; it will then link Sittwe seaport to Lashio in Myanmar via Kaladan river boat route and then from Lashio on to Mizoram in India by road transport. The project was scheduled to be completed by 2014 according to Governor of Mizoram Vakkom Purushothaman., but there have been delays and the project was completed till the road component from Lashio to Mizoram, the project was again expected to be finished by December 2023 but was again slowed due to security problems in Myanmar .

=== Visas ===
During a 2017 visit to Nay Pyi Taw, Prime Minister Modi announced that India would offer gratis/no-cost visas to all Myanmar citizens visiting India.

== Strategic cooperation ==
India's move to forge close relations with Myanmar are motivated by a desire to counter China's growing influence as a regional leader and enhance its own influence and standing. Concerns and tensions increased in India over China's extensive military involvement in developing ports, naval and intelligence facilities and industries, specifically the upgrading of a naval base in Sittwe, a major seaport located close to the eastern Indian city of Kolkata. India's engagement of the Burmese military junta has helped ease the regime's international isolation and lessen Burma's reliance on China. Both nations sought to cooperate to counteract drug trafficking and insurgent groups operating in the border areas. India and Myanmar are leading members of BIMSTEC and the Mekong-Ganga Cooperation, along with Vietnam, Laos, Cambodia and Thailand, helping India develop its influence and ties amongst Southeast Asian nations.

In 2013, India provided a loan of about US$500 million to Myanmar for its development. India and Myanmar have also agreed to cooperate militarily in order to help modernise Myanmar's military.

In 2020, India gifted the Myanmar Navy its first ever submarine, a kilo class (INS Sindhuvir) attack submarine which has been refurbished and modernised by Hindustan Shipyard Limited.

== Security ties ==
Indian and Myanmar troops carried out jointly Operation Sunrise in 2019 in their respective territories to destroy several insurgent camps. However the threat to the Kaladan multi-modal transit transport project, India's gateway to Southeast Asia continues. In January 2023 operations by the Myanmar Air Force in a sparsely populated area along the border were carried out; proximity of local populations resulted in their disquiet.

India has also supported Myanmar in its efforts to combat Rohingya insurgent groups like the Arakan Rohingya Salvation Army (ARSA) and Aqa Mul Mujahideen (AMM), after Indian intelligence agencies found the ARSA and AMM to have links with terror groups like the Lashkar-e-Taiba (LeT) and Jaish-e-Mohammed (JeM) as well as reported Rohingya terrorists fighting alongside Pakistani extremists in Kashmir.

== Disaster relief ==
India responded promptly and effectively in rendering assistance after natural disaster in Myanmar such as the earthquake in Shan state (2010), Cyclone Mora (2017), Cyclone Komen (2015), and notably for 2025 Myanmar earthquake under Operation Brahma. India offered to help in capacity building in disaster risk mitigation as well as strengthening Myanmar's National Disaster Response Mechanism.

=== Covid-19 vaccines ===
India granted 1.7 million COVID-19 vaccines to Myanmar in the months of January and February 2021.

== Human rights ==
India was hesitant in reacting to the 2007 Burmese anti-government protests that had drawn overwhelming international condemnation. India also declared that it had no intention of interfering in Burma's internal affairs and that the Burmese people would have to achieve democracy by themselves as it respects the sovereignty of Myanmar. This low-key response has been widely criticised both within India and abroad as weakening India's credentials as a leading democratic nation.

In contrast to much of the international community, Prime Minister Modi declined to criticize Suu Kyi's handling of the 2016–17 Northern Rakhine State clashes or Myanmar's government's treatment of its Rohingya people.

India also announced plans to deport its Rohingya refugee population. Minister of State for Home Affairs Kiren Rijiju described the refugees as "illegal immigrants", echoing the Myanmar government position. Although the Rohingya have fought deportation in the Indian courts (partly on humanitarian grounds), in September 2017 the Indian government responded that India did not sign the 1951 Refugee Convention and most Rohingya arrived in India before the August 2017 violence. Some Indian media have reported that the country's intelligence agencies suspect militant Royhinga leaders of conspiring with Pakistani terrorists and planning to incite violence in India.

== See also ==
- Foreign relations of Burma
- Foreign relations of India
- India–Myanmar barrier
- India–Myanmar border
