= Zochachhuah =

Zochachhuah Zochawchhuah
- village
- Location within Mizoram Location within India
- Coordinates: 22°07′57″N 92°46′24″E
- Country: India
- State: Mizoram
- District: Lawngtlai district

Population (2011)
  - Total: 333

Languages
  - Official: Mizo
- Time zone: UTC+5:30 (IST)
- Vehicle registration: MZ
- Website: mizoram.nic.in

Zochawchhuah, also spelt Zochachhuah, is a village on the India-Myanmar border in Lawngtlai Block of Lawngtlai district in the state of Mizoram in India. It is located 4 km south of the District headquarters Lawngtlai, 10 km from Hmawngbuchhuah, 157 km from the State capital Aizawl. It is on the east bank of the Sekulh Lui River, which marks the India-Myanmar border.

== Demographics ==
As of 2011 India census, the population of Zochawchhuah village is 333, with 72 Households. There are 177 males (53%) and 156 females (47%), with 168 (50%) Scheduled Tribe and no Scheduled Cast.

== Connectivity ==
It is located 4 km south of the District headquarters Lawngtlai. It is located on the India-Myanmar border where National Highway 502 (India), Kaladan Multi-Modal Transit Transport Project, enters Myanmar.

=== India-Myanmar Border crossing ===
Zochawchhuah is an Indian border town with a functioning integrated immigration-and-customs India-Myanmar border check post on the Kaladan Multi-Modal Transit Transport Project.

== Economy ==
The mainstay of the economy is agriculture.

== See also ==
- Hmawngbuchhuah
- Kaladan Multi-Modal Transit Transport Project
- Sittwe Port
