= 2015 Indian counter-insurgency operation in Myanmar =

- Part of the spillover of the Northeast Indian insurgency in Myanmar
Date	9 June 2015
Location	India–Myanmar border
Result	Indian victory: Several insurgent camps destroyed (Per Indian officials)

Belligerents
India	NSCN-K; Kanglei Yawol Kanna Lup

Commanders and leaders
Gen. Dalbir Singh Suhag (Chief of Army Staff); Lt. Gen. Bipin Rawat (General Officer Commanding (GoC) of 3 Corps)	S.S. Khaplang (NSCN-K/GPNR); Chaplee Kilonser Starson (NSCN-K/ GPRN); N. Oken (KYKL)

Units involved
Indian Army: 21 Para (Special Forces); Army Aviation Corps	No specific units

Strength
70 Para SF operators ALH helicopters	300+

Casualties and losses
None	38 killed

On 9 June 2015, India conducted a cross-border strike, code named Operation Hot Pursuit, against insurgents belonging to NSCN-K. The operation took place in Myanmar and it was in response to ambush of Indian Army convoy of 6 Dogra Regiment in Chandel district of Manipur. Indian officials said that Indian Army Special Forces had crossed the border and inflicted significant casualties against the NSCN-K. According to Indian media reports, around 38 insurgents belonging to NSCN-K were killed during the operation. The operation lasted around 40 minutes.

== Details ==
Based on precise intelligence inputs, the 21 PARA (SF) carried a cross-border operation along the India–Myanmar border and destroyed two Militant camps one each of NSCN (K) and KYKL, along the India–Myanmar border. The operations were carried out inside the Myanmar territory along the Nagaland and Manipur border at two locations. One of the locations is near Ukhrul in Manipur. The army attacked two transit camps of the Naga militants.

Seventy-two special forces commandos were reportedly involved in the operation. They were equipped with advanced assault rifles, rocket launchers, grenades and night vision goggles. The commandos wore the uniforms of the 12 Bihar Battalion of Indian army, which was then deployed on the India–Myanmar border. Troops were divided into two groups after they fast roped from Dhruv helicopter just inside the Indian territory near the border with Myanmar.

The teams trekked through the thick jungles for at least 50 kilometers before they reached the training camps. Each of the two teams were further divided into two sub-groups. While one was responsible for the direct assault, the second formed an outer ring to prevent any of insurgents from running and escaping. The actual operation (hitting the camp and destroying it) took about 40 minutes.

Mi-17 helicopters of the Indian Air Force were put on standby, ready to be pressed into service to evacuate the commandos in case anything went wrong.

In its statement after the operation, the Indian Army said it was in communication with Myanmar and that, "There is a history of close cooperation between our two militaries. We look forward to working with them to combat such terrorism, This entire operation was made successful by the code name Agent Lima with the input of his intelligence.".

According to Indian officials, heavy casualties were inflicted on the attackers behind the ambush on Army on 4 June, which had claimed the lives of 18 Army jawans (soldiers) of 6 Dogra Regiment in Chandel district of Manipur. This has been marked as the biggest attack on Indian Army after Kargil war of 1999.

== Casualties ==
Indian media initially claimed that around 15 to 20 insurgents belonging to NSCN-K were killed during the operation. However, Times of India, while citing unnamed source from Ministry of Home Affairs (India) claimed that more than 100 insurgents were killed during the whole operation.

Later on, Indian media reports claimed that around 38 insurgents were killed during the operation.

== Aftermath ==
Indian Army General Dalbir Singh Suhag claimed that the Indian troops had operated along the border with Myanmar. However, General Dalbir Singh's claims were contradicted by Indian information minister Rajyavardhan Singh Rathore. Col Rathore claimed that Indian troops had crossed the border to hit insurgents in Myanmar. Similarly Indian Army Chief, Lieutenant General Bipin Rawat, also confirmed that Indian troops had crossed Myanmar's border to attack NSCN-K insurgents.

Myanmar's government insisted that the operation did not take place on its territory and that Myanmar does not allow rebel groups to use its territory to stage attacks against foreign countries. Zaw Htay, director of Myanmar's presidential office, in a Facebook post claimed that Tatmadaw battalion belonging to Myanmar Army was sent to the location to ascertain the facts. The findings of the battalion confirmed that the operation took place on the Indian side of the territory.

National Socialist Council of Nagaland Khaplang faction (NSCN-K) also challenged Indian claims. NSCN-K claimed that their camp was not targeted and they did not suffer any casualties. The group challenged Indian Army to display the bodies killed in the attack.

== In media ==
=== Films ===
The 2019 Indian film Uri: The Surgical Strike briefly depicts the operation.

=== Documentaries ===
Special Operations: India "Myanmar" (2018) is a TV documentary about the operation which premiered on History TV18 Channel. It was directed and produced by Prabhu Asgaonkar and Manika Berry Asgaonkar.

== See also ==
- 2016 Indian Line of Control strike
- Involvement of Northeast Indian insurgents in the Myanmar conflict
- 2025 Indian strikes on Myanmar
