= Operation Golden Bird =

Military operation by Indian Army

Date	April – May 1995
Location	Indo-Burma border
Result	Indian-Burmese victory
Territorial changes	Rebels surrender all territory in India and Myanmar

Belligerents
India; Myanmar	ULFA; National Democratic Front of Boroland

Casualties and losses
(India) None (Myanmar) Unknown	38 rebels killed 118 captured

Operation Golden Bird was an Indian-Myanmar military operation conducted by the Indian Army in April–May 1995.

The operation was initiated by the 57th Mountain Division of the Indian Army, which tracked down and decapitated a rebel column that had picked up a huge consignment of weapons at the Wyakaung beach, on the Myanmar-Bangladesh coast south of Chittagong and Cox's Bazar, Bangladesh, and was moving that through the jungles of Mizoram, Northeast India. The consignment was to be delivered in Manipur, India. The operation was named after a Grimm Brothers fairytale. Operation Golden Bird was a joint India-Myanmar military operation carried out along the Mizoram border that led to the killing of dozens of militants. It was considered to be a successful counter-insurgency operation by the Indian Army.

== Background ==
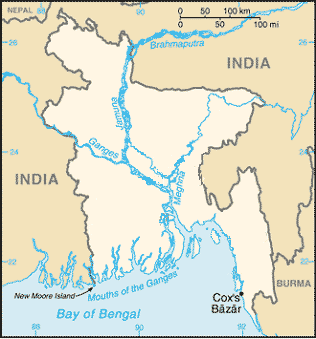
Location of Cox's Bazar in Bangladesh

The weapons were purchased in Thailand and were brought by sea to Bangladesh, before being smuggled back to Northeast India by groups of rebel guerrillas. Wyakaung beach, located south of Bangladesh's coastal town of Cox's Bazar, was the most common landing spot for these weapons, but at least six other points in the Cox's Bazar district were also used. The guerrillas of the National Socialist Council of Nagaland, the Manipuri groups, the United Liberation Front of Assam and the National Democratic Front of Boroland would then collect the weapons and carry them back via one of three routes: the Chittagong Hill Tracts-south Mizoram-east Manipur route, skirting the border with Burma; the Chittagong Hill Tracts-tripura-west Mizoram-west Manipur route; or the Chittagong-Sylhet-Meghalaya-Assam route. In the preceding several years, Sylhet-Meghalaya had been used more frequently by the rebels.

The Directorate General of Forces Intelligence helped the Northeast Indian rebel groups to safely land these weapons, and only on a few occasions were weapons meant for the rebel groups intercepted by the Bangladesh police, who believed that the weapons were intended for criminals in that country. With Bangladesh emerging as the gateway to Northeast India for weapons imported from Thailand, the rebels in Tripura were best located to carry them back. Both the National Liberation Front of Tripura and the All-Tripura Tiger Force secured weapons from the National Socialist Council of Nagaland. The National Democratic Front of Boroland and the United Liberation Front of Assam helped them cache the weapons at their bases in the Chittagong Hill Tracts before they were carried to their respective base areas in Northeast India.

== The operation ==
Location of Chittagong Hill Tracts in Bangladesh

Operation Golden Bird was initiated to intercept a column of north-eastern rebels —Naga, Manipuri and Assamese — travelling through the jungles of southern Mizoram after picking up a consignment of weapons that had landed at Wyakaung beach, on the Myanmar-Bangladesh coast. The operation was aimed at exposing the United Liberation Front of Assam, the National Socialist Council of Nagaland and Manipuri fighters in camps along the border. The Bangladesh military intelligence service, the Directorate General of Forces Intelligence, had helped carry the consignment in trucks to a hill base in the Chittagong Hill Tracts, from where the rebels had picked them up. The National Unity Party of Arakan guerrillas followed the whole operation, providing details to Indian military intelligence, on the basis of which India’s eastern army command initiated Operation Golden Bird. The rebel column was twice intercepted by Indian troops. It was a 45-day operation, but the operation ended abruptly as Rangoon ordered its army to pull out in the middle of the operation. The Myanmar army played its part by sealing its side of the border, until they were upset by the awarding of the Jawaharlal Nehru Award to Aung San Suu Kyi, and the survivors of the trapped rebel column were able to escape into the Myanmar's Chin Hills through gaps in the dragnet caused by the Myanmar Armed Forces' withdrawal.

== Casualties ==
38 rebels were killed, 118 captured and more than 100 weapons were seized with large quantities of ammunition. The captured rebels confessed to the weapons trail and India pressured Bangladesh during Khaleda Zia's first government (1991-1996) to close it. The Myanmar Army took some casualties in this operation.

== See also ==
- Indo-Burma barrier
- Operation Sunrise (2019)
- Insurgency in Northeast India
