= Rikhawdar =

Rikhawdar ရိခေါ်ဒါရ်
- Town
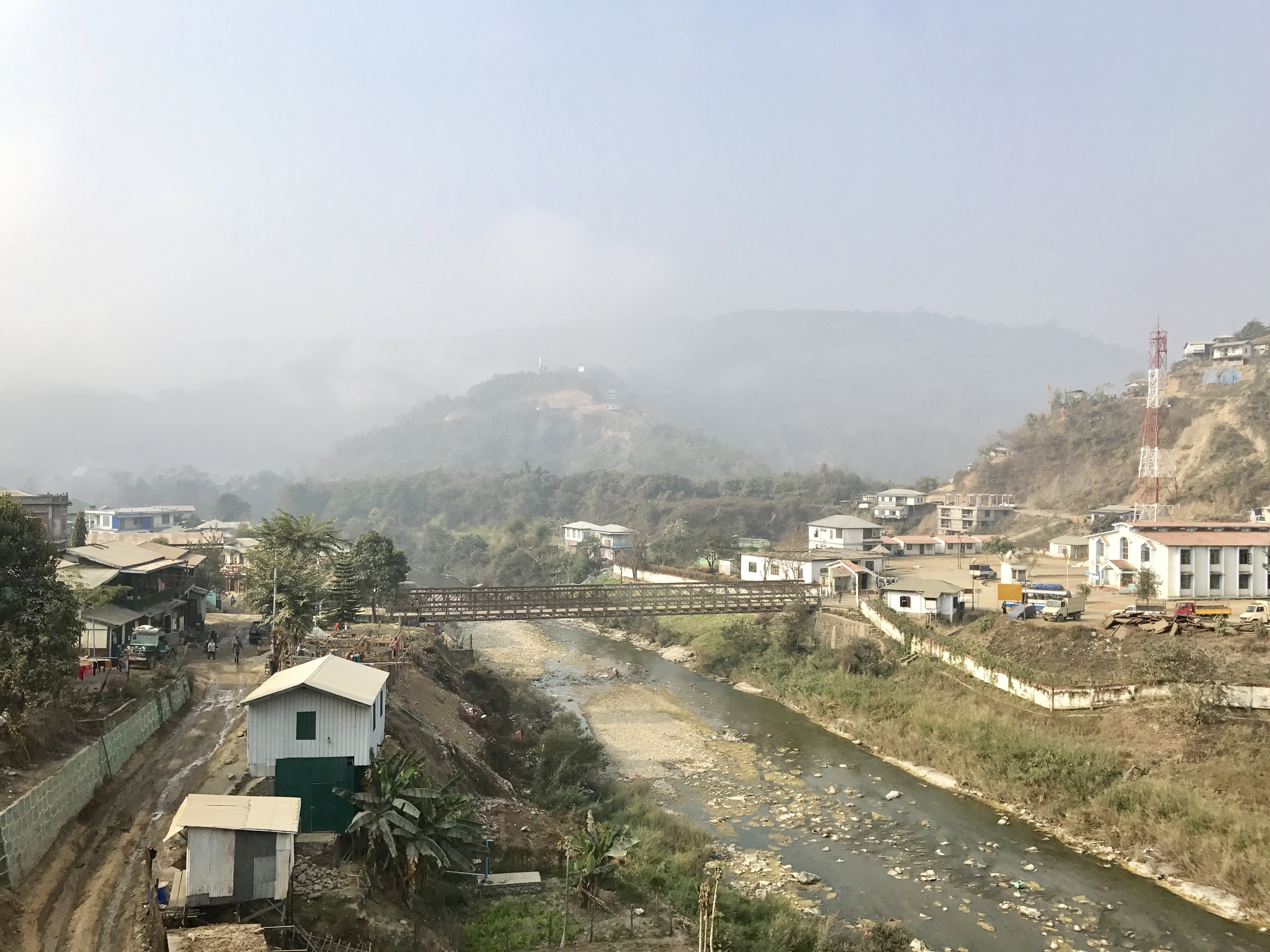
- Rikhawdar on the left and Zokhawthar on the right

- Location in Myanmar
- Coordinates: 23°21′55″N 93°23′08″E
- Country: Myanmar
- State: Chin State
- District: Falam District
- Township: Falam Township

Population (2014)
  - Town: 6,620
  - Urban: 3,604
  - Rural: 3,016

Demographics
  - Ethnicities: Burmese Mizos and Chin peoples
- Time zone: UTC+5:30 (MST)

Rikhawdar (Burmese: ရိခေါ်ဒါရ်; also called Rih), next to Khawmawi, is a border town in Falam District, Chin State, Myanmar. It lies opposite Zokhawthar village of the Champhai district of Mizoram, India, across the Tiau (Ciau) river. The town is home to an official border trade post with India, which opened on 10 December 2003.

On 13 November 2023 it was reported that the town and the border post were taken by CNA forces during the ongoing civil war.

== India-Myanmar border ==
Rikhawdar and Khawmawi form the east side of an India-Myanmar border crossing, which consists of two bridges—one pedestrian, and one vehicular—across the Harhva river. It is one of the two international border crossings in the Chin State.

== See also ==
- Borders of India
