= Lungleng River =

Lungleng river

Location
- Country: India
- State: Mizoram, Chin State, Rakhine State
- City: Zochachhuah

Physical characteristics
- Source
  - location: India
- Discharge
  - location: mouth

The Lungleng river, also known as the Lungleng Lui, is a river of Mizoram, northeastern India. It flows in a southerly direction towards Myanmar.

== Etymology ==
The Lungleng river gets its name from the Lung Leng tribe of people, who are sedentary river-dwelling agriculturist people.

== Lungleng Hydroelectric Project, Aizawl ==
The Lungleng Hydroelectric Project is located in Aizawl district of Mizoram which helps in utilization of the waters of the Tyao river. It generates power as a storage type development, harnessing a gross head of about 137 m. The diversion site is located at 23°38′13″N 92°39′10″E. The dam site is approachable from Lungleng which is 25 km from Aizawl. The Tyao river is also known as Tlawng or Dhaleswari or Katakha which is a tributary of River Kaladan from Burma. It is an important, very useful and the longest river in the state of Mizoram. Tlawng River passes through the Aizawl District and it flanks the western side of Aizawl City.

== Kaladan river route ==
This river is also part of the Kaladan Multi-modal Transit Transport Project.

== See also ==
- East-West Industrial Corridor Highway, Arunachal Pradesh
- Arunachal Border Highway
- Asian Highway Network
- India-Myanmar-Thailand Friendship Highway
