= Khawmawi =

- village
- Location in Myanmar
- Coordinates: 23.3652465°N 93.3855078°E
- Country: Myanmar

Languages
- Time zone: UTC+5:30 (MST)
- Website: https://hualngoram.org

Khawmawi is a Myanmar border village in Hualngoram region of the Chin State. The village is located on the Tiau (Ciau) river. On the opposite bank of the river is the Indian border village of Zokhawthar in Champhai district, Mizoram.

== India-Myanmar border ==
It has a border check-post.

== See also ==
- Borders of India
