= Ngame, Myanmar =

Ngame
- town
- Location in Myanmar
- Coordinates: 21°04′54″N 92°58′12″E
- Country: Myanmar
- Division: Rakhine State
- District: Sittwe District
- Township: Kyauktaw Township
- Elevation: 187 ft (57 m)
- Time zone: UTC+6.30 (MST)

Ngame is a town in Kyauktaw Township, Sittwe District, in the Rakhine State of western Myanmar (formerly known as Burma), located on the right bank of the Kaladan River, just south of the border with Chin State.
