= Tyao River =

Tyao River Tiau River
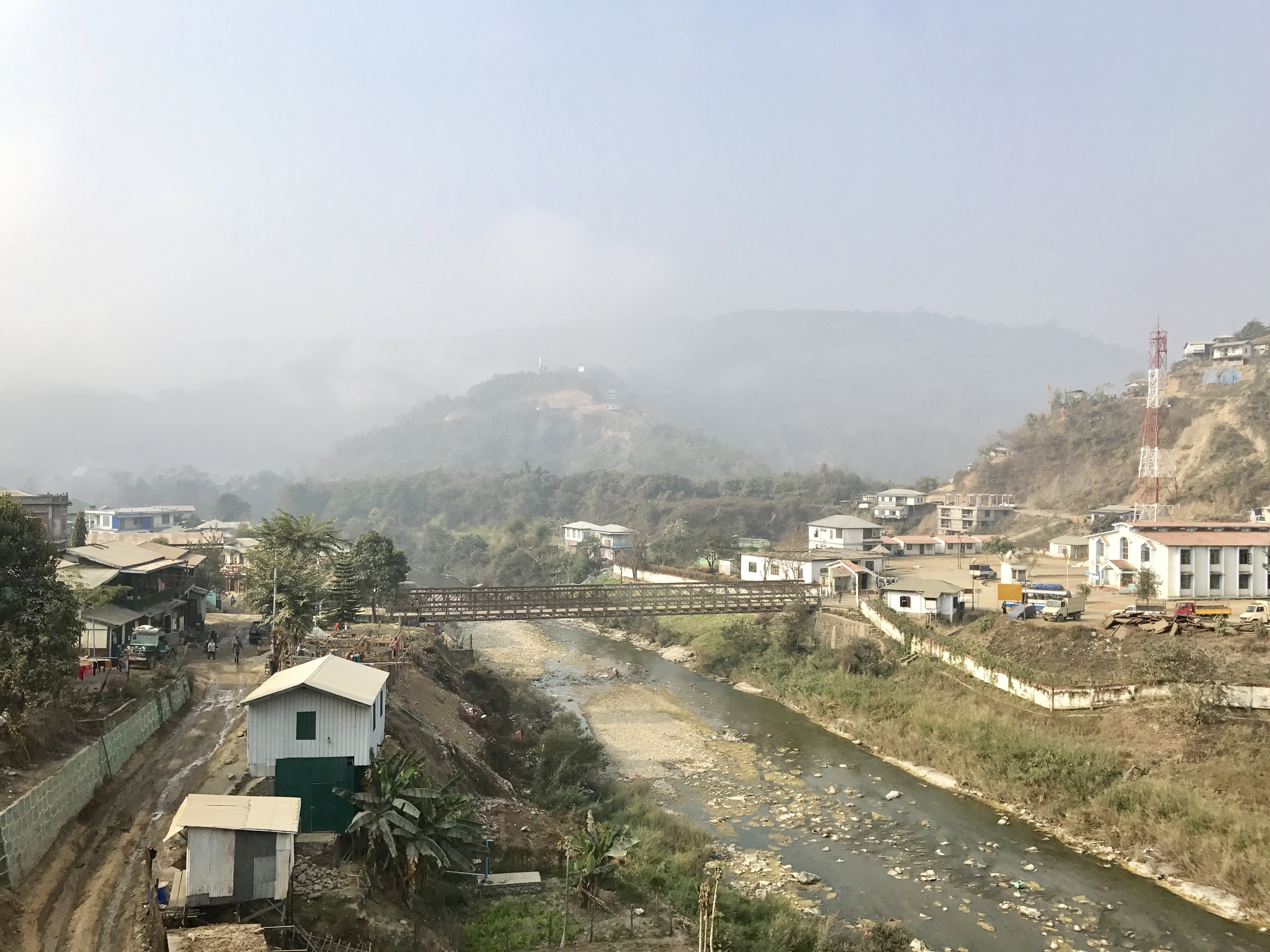
- Bridge over the Tyao river between Rikhawdar and Zokhawthar

Location
- Country: India, Myanmar
- State: Mizoram, Chin State
- District: Champhai, Falam

Physical characteristics
- Source
  - location: Khuangphah
  - coordinates: 23.7125°N 93.4066°E
- Mouth
  - location: Kaladan River
  - coordinates: 22.7861°N 93.0957°E
- Length: 159 km (99 mi)

Tyao River (or Tiau River, Tio River) is a 159 km (99 mi) long river that flows between the Mizoram state in India and the Chin State in Myanmar, forming part of the international boundary between the two countries.

It rises near Khuangphah village of Champhai district in Mizoram, India. It ultimately merges with the Kaladan River (Chhimtuipui river).

The twin towns of Zokhawthar in Mizoram and Rikhawdar in Chin State are on the opposing banks of the river. There is an official border crossing between the two towns, connected by a bridge that crosses the river.
