= Lawngtlai district =

- District of Mizoram
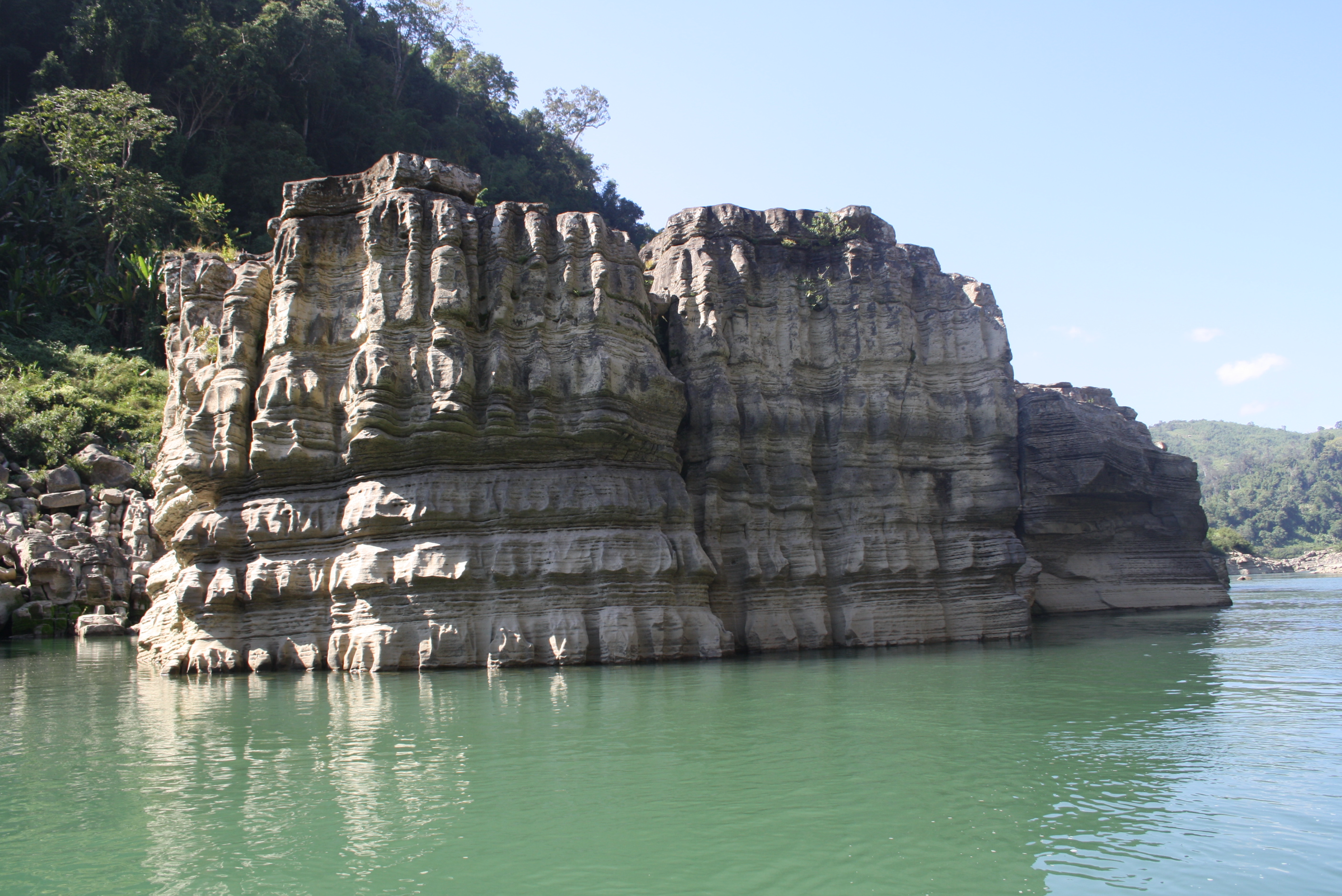
- Castle of Beino

- Location in Mizoram
- Coordinates (Lawngtlai): 22°24′N 92°44′E
- Country: India
- State: Mizoram
- Headquarters: Lawngtlai

Government
  - Lok Sabha constituencies: Mizoram
  - Vidhan Sabha constituencies: 1. Tuichawng, 2. Lawngtlai West and 3. Lawngtlai East

Area
  - District of Mizoram: 2,557 km^{2} (987 sq mi)

Population (2011)
  - District of Mizoram: 117,894
  - Density: 46.11/km^{2} (119.4/sq mi)
  - Urban: 20,830

Demographics
  - Literacy: 65.88
  - Sex ratio: 945
- Time zone: UTC+05:30 (IST)
- Average annual precipitation: 2558 mm
- Website: lawngtlai.nic.in

Lawngtlai district is one of the eleven districts of Mizoram state in India. The district headquarters is Lawngtlai.

== History ==
Prior to the arrival of the British in the late 19th century, the area which became Lawngtlai District was ruled by local chieftains, whose zones of control were often a single village or small group of villages. In 1888 the chief of the Fungkah village attacked a British surveying team and killed four men including a Lt. Stewart. The following year the British sent in a punitive expedition to pacify the area. What became Lawngtlai District was incorporated into the South Lushai Hills and administered by the lieutenant governor of Bengal. In 1898 North and South Lushai Hills were merged into the Lushai Hills District and were administered as part of Assam. In 1919, the Lushai Hills, along with some of the other hill districts, were declared "Backward Tracts" under the Government of India Act, and in 1935 this denomination was changed to "excluded area". In 1952 the creation of the Lushai Hills Autonomous District Council removed the last power of the local chieftains. The area became part of Mizoram when the Union Territory of Mizoram was created in 1972, and remained a part of it when the state was created in 1987. Originally part of Chhimtuipui District, the area that became Lawngtlai District was divided into four rural development blocks: the Lawngtlai Rural Development Block with headquarters at Lawngtlai, Sangau Rural Development Block with headquarters at Sangau, Bungtlang South Rural Development Block with headquarters at Bungtlang South and the Chawngte Rural Development Block with headquarters at Chawngte. Lawngtlai district became a separate district on 11 November 1998.

== Geography ==
Lawngtlai district is located in the southwesternmost part of Mizoram having international boundaries with Bangladesh to the west and Myanmar to the south. The district is bounded by Lunglei District to the north and Saiha District to the east. The Thega (Kawrpui) River forms most of the boundary with Bangladesh on the west and the Kaladan River forms the eastern boundary with Saiha District. Lawngtlai district occupied an area of 2557.10 km^{2} (2001 Census). The area is mountainous and hilly with a small strip of low-lying riverine plain along the western side of the Chamdur Valley. Landslides are common especially during rainy season. The western side of the district is covered by dense virgin forest. The main rivers include the Kaladan River, Tuichong River, the Chhimtuipui River, the Ngengpui River, the Chawngte River and the Tuiphal River.

=== Climate ===
Lawngtlai district has a moderate climate. In general, it is cool in summer and not very cold in winter. In winter the temperature varies from 8 °C to 24 °C and in summer, the temperature varies between 18 °C and 32 °C. The western part of the district has less elevation comparing to the eastern part, and hence it experiences a little warmer climate than the eastern part. Relative humidity is highest during the south-west monsoon when it reaches to about 85%. The district is under the direct influence of south-west monsoon and heavy precipitation is usually received from May to September every year. The average annual rainfall is about 2558 mm. The hottest period is from March to August every year. During the rainy season, it remains heavily clouded. There is an increase of cloudiness from March onwards. A clear and cool weather starts appearing from September and remains till January the next year.

== Economy ==
One-third of the total inhabitants of Lawngtlai district rely entirely on agriculture, which is mostly based on the traditional method of shifting cultivation. Only a small fraction of the urban population is involved in permanent employment, such as state government service, banks and schools, and few are engaged in small-scale businesses. The economic status of the district is, in fact, the lowest among the districts in Mizoram.

=== Zorinpui Integrated Check Post ===
Zorinpui Integrated Check Post in Lawngtlai district is an integrated immigration and customs check post that became operational in October 2017 to cater to the Kaladan Multi-Modal Transit Transport Project.

== Administrative Divisions ==
Lawngtlai district is divided into two Autonomous District Councils and four Rural Development Blocks:

=== Autonomous District Councils ===
- Chakma Autonomous District Council
- Lai Autonomous District Council

=== Rural Development Blocks ===
1. Chawngte Rural Development Block (part of Chakma Autonomous District Council)
2. Bungtlang South Rural Development Block (part of Lai Autonomous District Council)
3. Lawngtlai Rural Development Block (part of Lai Autonomous District Council)
4. Sangau Rural Development Block (part of Lai Autonomous District Council)

== Demographics ==
Historical population
Year	Pop.	±% p.a.
1971	29,367	—
1981	44,277	+4.19%
1991	64,946	+3.91%
2001	87,592	+3.04%
2011	117,894	+3.02%

Religions in Lawngtlai district (2011)
Religion	Percent
Christianity	54.19%
Buddhism	43.72%
Hinduism	1.41%
Islam	0.44%
Other or not stated	0.20%

Block	Christian	Buddhist	Other
Lawngtlai	34,072	3,438	1,212
Chawngte	2,735	41,715	857
Bungthlang	10,439	6,387	300
Sangau	16,646	9	84

According to the 2011 census Lawngtlai district has a population of 117,894, roughly equal to the nation of Grenada. This gives it a ranking of 611th in India (out of a total of 640). The district has a population density of 46 inhabitants per square kilometre (120/sq mi). Its population growth rate over the decade 2001–2011 was 34.59%. Lawngtlai has a sex ratio of 945 females for every 1000 males, and a literacy rate of 65.88%. 17.67% of the population lives in urban areas. Scheduled Tribes make up 95.30% of the population.

Languages spoken in Lawngtlai district (2011)
1. Chakma (39.3%)
2. Mizo (23.2%)
3. Pawi (21.0%)
4. Tripuri (7.22%)
5. Others (9.30%)

According to the 2011 census, 39.28% of the population spoke Chakma, 23.24% Mizo, 20.96% Pawi and 7.22% Tripuri as their first language. Many other languages are spoken here that are spoken in the Chittagong Hill Tracts.

== Flora and fauna ==
In 1997, Lawngtlai district became home to the Ngengpui Wildlife Sanctuary, which has an area of 110 km^{2} (42.5 mi^{2}).
