= Khenman =

Myanmar
- village
- Location in Myanmar
- Coordinates: 24.007071°N 93.557675°E
- Country: Myanmar

Languages
- Time zone: UTC+5:30 (MST)

Khenman is a border village on the boundary of India and Myanmar. Majority of the local population belongs to the Zomi community. Other communities include Tedim (Chin), Paite.

== Ruins of World War II ==
Constructed during World War II, the Tedim road passes through this village, and it connects the Indian city of Imphal and the Burmese town of Tedim. A contingent of the Japanese army took this road which was then still under construction. So, the Allied Forces destroyed some bridges on the Tedim road in order to check the advance of the Japanese troops. Ruins of British built bridges still remain near Behiang and surrounding villages like Tonzang and Zangnuam.

== Border Trade Centre Approved By Union Government ==
Khenman is the nearest Burmese village from Behiang. For a number of decades, a brisk border trade has been carried out unofficially at this border village. Despite its potential, this bazaar village still lacks the infrastructure to develop into a booming commercial town.

Aimed at boosting the Indo-Myanmar border trade, the Central Government of India had approved the setting up of an Integrated Check Post (ICP) at Behiang on 27 May 2012. On October 3, 2012, the State's Minister of Commerce and Industry, Konthoujam Govindas and the MLA of Singngat, GS Haupu accompanied by officials visited Behiang to ascertain land availability for the construction of the proposed Border Trade Center which is also part of the Union Government's Look East Policy. The visiting team has finalized a land area of 10 acres for the construction of the trade centre.

== Local Economy ==
Khenman is a border town next to Behiang and people live off the Indo-Burma border trade.
