= Khuangphah =

- village
- Location in Mizoram, India Khuangphah (India)
- Coordinates: 23.7766537°N 93.380151°E
- Country: India
- State: Mizoram
- District: Champhai
- Block: Champhai
- Elevation: 1,499 m (4,918 ft)

Population (2011)
  - Total: 728
- Time zone: UTC+5:30 (IST)
- 2011 census code: 271343

Khuangphah is a village in the Champhai district of Mizoram, India. It is located in the Champhai R.D. Block.

== Demographics ==
According to the 2011 census of India, Khuangphah has 129 households. The effective literacy rate (i.e. the literacy rate of population excluding children aged 6 and below) is 90.04%.

Demographics (2011 Census)
	Total	Male	Female
Population	728	372	356
Children aged below 6 years	166	80	86
Scheduled caste	0	0	0
Scheduled tribe	722	370	352
Literates	506	277	229
Workers (all)	340	179	161
Main workers (total)	337	178	159
Main workers: Cultivators	300	155	145
Main workers: Agricultural labourers	1	1	0
Main workers: Household industry workers	1	1	0
Main workers: Other	35	21	14
Marginal workers (total)	3	1	2
Marginal workers: Cultivators	1	1	0
Marginal workers: Agricultural labourers	0	0	0
Marginal workers: Household industry workers	0	0	0
Marginal workers: Others	2	0	2
Non-workers	388	193	195
