= Manipuri–Burmese wars of 1717 to 1749 =

Manipuri – Burmese Wars of 1717–1749
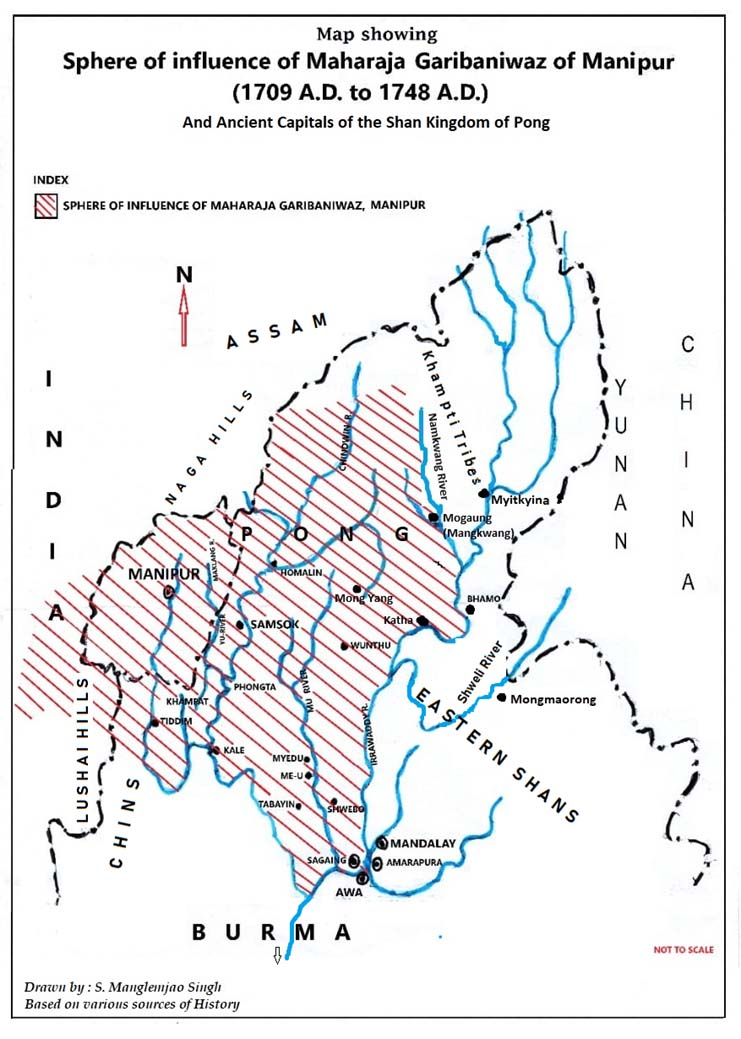
Date	1717 C.E – 1738 C.E
Location	Myanmar
Result	Manipuri victory
Territorial changes	Manipur captures Myedu, Sagaing and significant portions of Northern Burma.

Belligerents
Manipur	Toungoo Dynasty; Manikya Dynasty; Kingdom of Pong

Commanders and leaders
Charairongba; Pamheiba	Mahadhammaraza Dipadi; Taninganway Min

Strength
20,000+	Unknown

Casualties and losses
More	Less

The Manipur – Burmese wars of 1717–1749 were a series of conflicts between Manipur under Gharib Niwaz and the Toungoo dynasty of Burma.

== Background ==
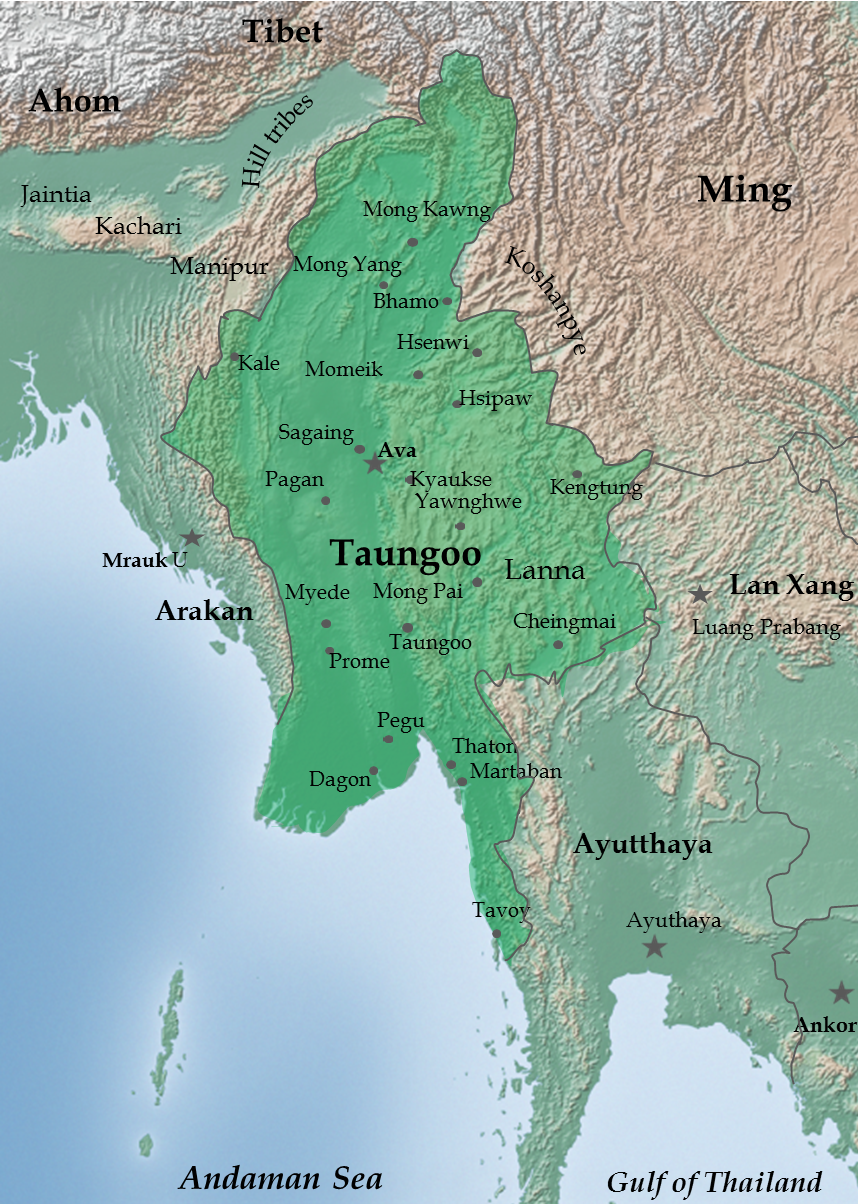
The Toungoo kingdom of Burma, c. 1650

The conflict between the Kingdom of Manipur and the Kingdom of Burma, also known as Awa, was sparked by a series of events rooted in familial ties and political grievances. Following the demotion of his sister, who was married to the Burmese King as Awa-Leima, Manipur King Charairongba harbored deep resentment. Before his demise, he tasked his son Pamheiba (Garibaniwaz) with avenging this slight against their family. The tensions escalated when a delegation from Burma, accompanied by Samsok emissaries, arrived in Manipur seeking a Meitei princess's hand in marriage. Despite King Garibaniwaz's courteous reception, the presence of the Samsok people further fueled his anger, setting the stage for further hostilities between the two kingdoms.

== Early Conflict ==
In 1724, Gharib Niwaz deceived the Burmese king by pretending to bring a princess as a companion for the Burmese monarch's princess. Instead, he captured 300 Burmese lords and ladies who had come to receive the supposed princess, taking them captive to Manipur. The Burmese launched an invasion into Manipur in revenge. The Burmese troops were intercepted by Manipuri army at Mangsha, and defeated them. The Manipur royal chronicle Cheitharol Kumbaba records that 157 Burmese were caught in the whole 9 days long operation.

== Mu-Valley Campaign of 1735 ==
In 1735, Gharib Niwaz launched a campaign into the Mu Valley in Central Burma. Manipuri army entered Myedu in Shwebo District, destroying villages and pagodas, and captured cattle and 1000 people.

== Campaign of 1737 ==
Two years later, in 1737, King Pamheiba achieved further military success by defeating two Burmese armies consecutively. These Burmese forces comprised 7,000 foot soldiers, 700 horsemen, and 20 elephants. The victories led to the devastation of the region from the banks of the Khodoung Khyoung to Tabayin, solidifying his sphere of influence in the region.

== Campaign of 1738 ==
In 1738, King Gharib Niwaz launched another military campaign by crossing the Chindwin River once again. Manipuri army dispersed a Burmese army consisting of 15,000 foot soldiers, 8,000 horsemen, and 80 elephants. Subsequently, he led a force of 20,000 men to launch a decisive attack on the stockaded positions around the ancient capital of Sagaing, ultimately gaining control of these strategic locations.

== Campaign of 1739 ==
In 1739, King Gharib Niwaz, aided by the Cacharis, invaded Ava, the capital of then Burmese Empire with a force of 20,000 men with an aim to dispersed Ava. However, the Manipuri forces failed in their attack on a Burmese force that was stockaded at Myedoo. Pamheiba was then deserted by his Cachari allies, and after suffering significant losses, he was compelled to retreat back.

== Impact ==
The Mon Rebellion for Restored Hanthawaddy Kingdom, which marked the end of the Toungoo dynasty, was a response to the Ava court's inability to manage the invasions of Manipur. This was not a carefully planned rising, but rather a spontaneous outbreak due to the prevailing circumstances. The Manipuri invasion reaching the walls of Ava, and the eastern entrance of the Kaunghmudaw Pagoda still bears the sword marks of Gharib Niwaz made a chilling reminder of the violence that ensued. In such volatile conditions, rebellion was inevitable.

King Pamheiba campaigned in Mu-Valley, including Mydeu town, in 1735-1738. He stayed over a month at in Shwebo District, where the future emperor Alaungpaya, then a boy, observed the events. Alaungpaya grew up watching Manipuris ransacking his home region year after year. After becoming the monarch of Burma, he sent an expedition to Manipur to "instill respect". In early 1756, the Burmese army defeated the Manipuri army and ransacked the country, which the Manipuris call the First Devastation.
