= Operation Sunrise (2019) =

Military operation by Indian and Myanmar Army

- Part of Insurgency in Northeast India
| Date | First Phase: February – March 2019; Second Phase: May – June 2019 |
| Location | Northeast India, Rakhine State, Myanmar |
| Result | Successful: India and Myanmar manage to reduce insurgent activity |

Belligerents
| Myanmar: Tatmadaw; Myanmar Police Force; India: Indian Armed Forces; Assam Rifles; Central Reserve Police Force | Arakan Army; National Socialist Council of Nagaland; United Liberation Front of Asom; National Democratic Front of Boroland; Kamtapur Liberation Organisation |

Commanders and leaders
| (Myanmar) Soe Win (Myanmar) Min Aung Hlaing (India) Anil Chauhan (India) Ajit Doval (India) Narendra Modi | Paresh Baruah; Jyotirmoy Asom †; Twan Mrat Naing; Thuingaleng Muivah; B. Saoraigwra |

Casualties and losses
| 13 Myanmar soldiers killed | 10–12 Arakan Army camps destroyed; 2 ULFA-I soldiers killed; 38 northeast militants killed; Several injured and arrested |

Operation Sunrise refers to a series of coordinated military operations conducted by the Indian Army and the Myanmar Armed Forces (Tatmadaw) in 2019, targeting insurgent camps along the India-Myanmar border. The operation was done in two phases dubbed as Operation Sunrise I and Operation Sunrise II, aimed to dismantle bases of militant groups threatening regional security and India's strategic infrastructure, notably the Kaladan Multi-Modal Transit Transport Project. The operation resulted in a bilateral military cooperation between India and Myanmar to counter cross-border insurgency.

== Background ==
India and Myanmar share a 1,640-kilometer border which has historically been exploited by insurgent groups operating in India's Northeast. The groups have often established camps in Myanmar's remote border regions, using them as bases to launch attacks in India. Additionally, the Arakan Army posed a threat to the Kaladan Multi-Modal Transit Transport Project which is a key infrastructure initiative to connect India's Northeast to Southeast Asia via Myanmar's Sittwe Port. The operation was a joint action to secure the region and dismantle the insurgent camps located in Myanmar's Sagaing region.

Route map of Kaladan Project

== Operation ==
=== Phase 1 ===
Operation Sunrise I took place between February 17 and March 2, 2019, focusing on neutralizing threats to the Kaladan Project and insurgent camps along the border. The primary objective was to dismantle camps of the Arakan Army, which had established bases near the Kaladan Project threatening Indian workers and infrastructure development. The operation also aimed to disrupt other anti-India insurgent groups operating from Myanmar, including the NSCN-K.

The operation was a coordinated effort, with the Indian Army mobilizing troops along the Mizoram border to strengthen defenses and provide surveillance support, while the Myanmar Army conducted strikes against insurgent camps within its territory. Indian forces reportedly did not cross the border but maintained a strong posture to prevent insurgents from fleeing into India. The Myanmar Army targeted Arakan Army camps and NSCN-K bases, including those in the Taga area of Sagaing Region.

Arakan Army later moved towards the Indian border near Mizoram, raising concerns about attacks on Indian workers. Indian intelligence detected the movements leading to coordination between National Security Adviser Ajit Doval and Director General of Military Operations Lt. Gen. Anil Chauhan with Myanmar's military leadership.

India secured its border while Myanmar's forces attacked Arakan Army camps in Chin State, near the border. Over two weeks, 10–12 camps were targeted. While Myanmar forces faced resistance, the operation primarily focused on destroying infrastructure rather than direct combat. The operation successfully disrupted the Arakan Army's ability to threaten the Kaladan Project, with no major spillover into India or casualties reported.

Operation Sunrise I resulted in the destruction of at least 10 camps belonging to the Arakan Army. The operation disrupted AA activities near the Kaladan Multi-Modal Transit Transport Project, temporarily securing the area for continued development. The Myanmar Army took control of NSCN-K's headquarters in Taga, with several NSCN-K leaders reportedly detained. The operation was hailed as a success in bilateral cooperation, though the threat to the Kaladan Project persisted.

=== Phase 2 ===
Operation Sunrise II was conducted from May 16 to early June 2019, lasting approximately three weeks. This operation aimed to target a broader range of insurgent groups operating in India's Northeast and Myanmar. The operation focused on camps belonging to NSCN-K, ULFA, NDFB, and KLO, which were regrouping after the first phase.

Both armies conducted operations within their own territories coordinating closely through liaison officers. The Indian Army was backed by the Assam Rifles operated along the borders of Nagaland, Manipur, and Assam, while the Myanmar Army targeted insurgent camps in the Sagaing Region and Chin State. The strategy followed a “hammer and anvil” approach as Indian forces secured the border to block insurgent escape routes as Myanmar troops launched direct assaults on the camps.

The operation began with the Indian Army where 15 battalions, including Assam Rifles and infantry units were deployed. The forces were supported by Special Forces, drones, and night-vision equipment which were sealed off to escape routes to prevent insurgents from crossing into India. On the Myanmar side, the Tatmadaw, under the North-West Command, initiated ground assaults on insurgent camps in the Sagaing Region, specifically targeting the Taga area, known for harboring anti-India militants. Myanmar forces attacked seven to eight camps used for training, arms storage, and planning attacks. Despite encountering resistance from insurgents, particularly from groups like NSCN-K and ULFA-I, who engaged in intense firefights, the operation's main goal was to dismantle insurgent infrastructure. The Myanmar Army reportedly killed two insurgents, including a senior ULFA-I leader, Major Jyotirmoy Asom, in Taga, though the operation's focus remained on infrastructure destruction rather than maximizing casualties.

During operation sunrise II, According to reports, more than six dozen militants from groups such as the National Socialist Council of Nagaland-Khaplang (NSCN-K), United Liberation Front of Assam (ULFA), National Democratic Front of Boroland (NDFB), and Kamtapur Liberation Organisation (KLO) were apprehended, and several of their camps were destroyed.

The Myanmar Army reportedly suffered casualties during the operation, with at least 13 soldiers killed in clashes with the Arakan Army.

== Aftermath ==
The Arakan Army remained active in the region despite the operations. There were also concerns raised by local communities in India's Northeast, particularly in Mizoram, about the increased military presence and the role of central forces without prior consultation with state authorities. Although the operations disrupted several insurgent networks, some of the groups were reported to have regrouped later.

The two countries later planned to continued with a third phase, Operation Sunrise III to launch by 2020 but it did not take place properly.

Following these operations, India emphasized the importance of continued cooperation with Myanmar to prevent insurgent groups from using its territory as a base. Prime Minister Narendra Modi highlighted this during discussions with at that time Myanmar's State Counsellor Aung San Suu Kyi at the ASEAN Summit in Bangkok in November 2019. He also expressed India's readiness to expand socio-economic projects in Rakhine State.

To further solidify defense collaboration, India and Myanmar signed a Memorandum of Understanding (MoU) in July 2019. This agreement focused on enhancing military training, joint surveillance, maritime security, and infrastructure development. The MoU was signed during the visit of Myanmar's Commander-in-Chief of Defence Services, Senior General Min Aung Hlaing, to India.

== See also ==
- Involvement of Northeast Indian insurgents in the Myanmar conflict
- Naxalite–Maoist insurgency
