= Sittwe Port =

Coordinates: 20°08′40″N 92°53′49″E

- Click on the map for a fullscreen view

Location
- Country: Myanmar
- Location: Sittwe, Rakhine State

Details
- Opened: est. 2013
- Owned by: Government of Myanmar

Statistics
- Website www.sittweport.com

Sittwe Port is a deepwater port constructed by India in 2016 at Sittwe, the capital of Rakhine State in Myanmar, on the Bay of Bengal. Situated at the mouth of the Kaladan River, the US$120 Million port is being financed by India as a part of the Kaladan Multi-Modal Transit Transport Project, a collaboration between India and Myanmar. The project is aimed at developing transport infrastructure in Southwestern Myanmar and Northeastern India.

== History ==
The proposal for the Kaladan Multi-Modal Transit Transport Project was conceived by India, primarily to provide an alternative route to India's landlocked northeastern states. The only access to these seven states is through the Siliguri Corridor, a narrow strip of Indian territory wedged between Nepal and Bangladesh. Routing all cargo destined for the northeast through this corridor causes significant transportation delays and cost overheads. India attempted negotiating with Bangladesh since the 1970s for transit access from the Bay of Bengal to these states, but was repeatedly denied access by the latter.

The USD 500 million Kaladan project was hence conceived as an alternative, aimed at accelerating infrastructure and economic development in both India and Myanmar. The project includes the construction of a deepwater port at the mouth of the Kaladan River in Sittwe, the dredging of the river to enable cargo vessels to navigate the river from Sittwe to Mizoram in India, the construction of a river port at Paletwa in Myanmar's Chin State and the upgrade of highways from Paletwa to Myeikwa on the Indo-Myanmar border.

In 2017, the Sittwe port, Paletwa jetty, road to India and shipments to India are likely to be operational in 2019. In April 2017, India handed over the operation of completed Sittwe port and Inland Water Terminal at Paletwa to Myanmar. In June 2017, India added six gas tanker cargo vessels to transport gas to Northeast India via Manipur.

An agreement on the project was signed between the governments of India and Myanmar in April 2009. The contract for the construction for the Sittwe port was awarded to the Essar Group of India. The USD 120 Million port is being funded through a long-term interest-free credit line from India. Construction started in 2010, and is expected to be completed by June 2013.

There is also to a proposal to build 1,575 km long Sittwe-Aizawl-Silchar-Guwahati-Siliguri-Gaya gas pipeline to transport gas from Sittwe Gas Field where ONGC and GAIL hold 30 percent stake in oil and gas exploration.
