= Lawngtlai =

- Town
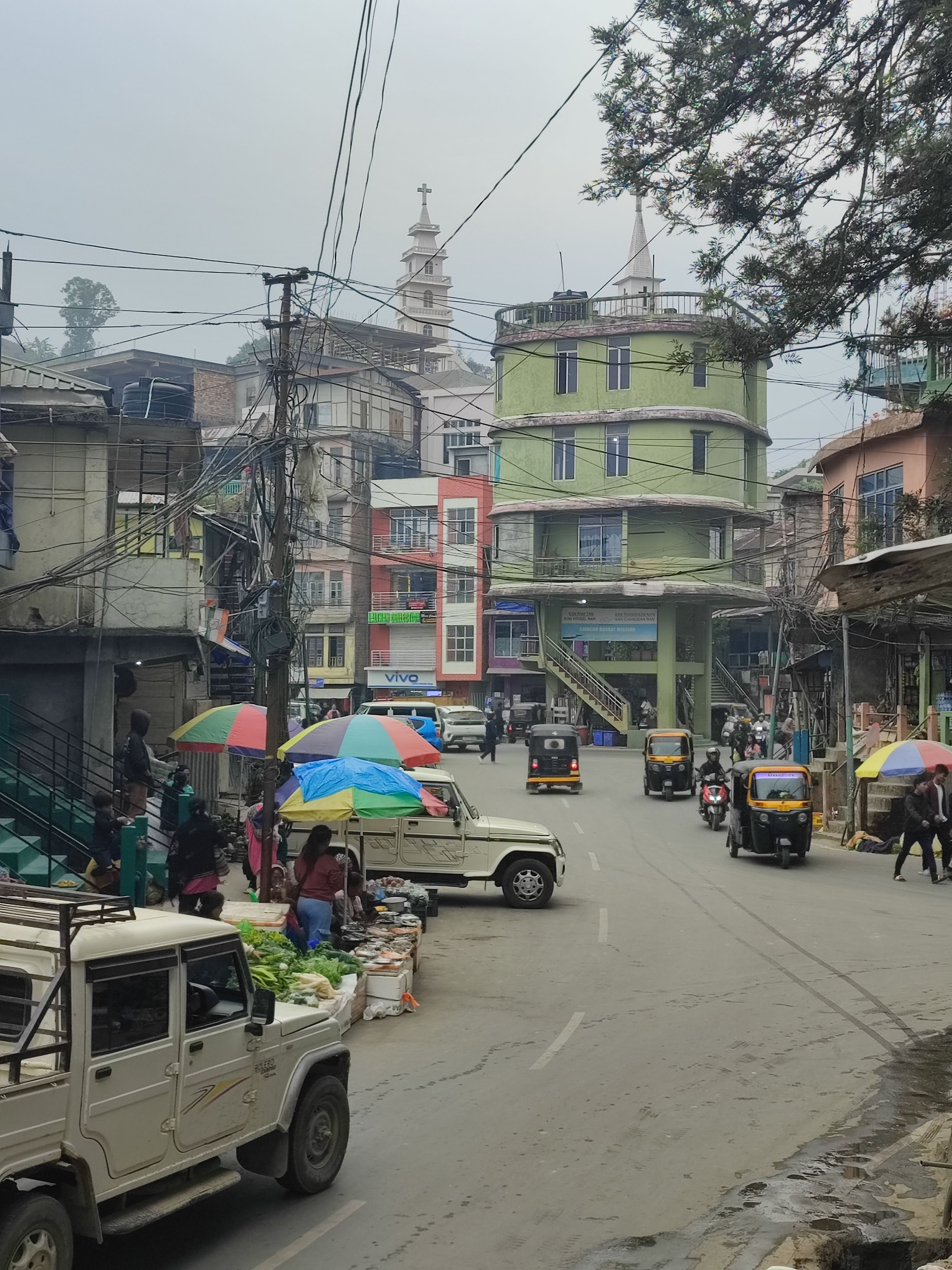

- Location within Mizoram Location within India
- Coordinates: 22.532°N 92.899°E
- Country: India
- State: Mizoram
- District: Lawngtlai
- Established: 1880
- Founder: Haihmunga Hlawncheu

Population (2011)
  - Total: 20,838

Languages
  - Official: Lai Mizo& Chakma
- Time zone: UTC+5:30 (IST)
- PIN: 796891
- Vehicle registration: MZ
- Nearest city: Aizawl
- Lok Sabha constituency: Mizoram
- Vidhan Sabha constituency: Lawngtlai E & W
- Climate: Cwa
- Website: mizoram.nic.in

Lawngtlai is a town located in the southern part of Mizoram, India. It serves as the administrative headquarters of the Lawngtlai district and is home to the Pawi people, also known as the Hakha Chin people. Lawngtlai celebrates a variety of indigenous festivals, such as the Hlukhla Kut, similar to that of the Chapchar Kut celebrated elsewhere in the state.

== History ==
Lawngtlai village was established by Haihmunga Hlawncheu, a Lai Chief, in 1880 at the place known currently as Vengpui. It was named after he seized a boat drifting down the Kaladan river, and literally means "seized boat" in Lai.

== Demographics ==
According to the 2011 Census of India, Lawngtlai has a population of 20,830, of which there are 10,159 males and 10,171 females. The number of children with ages 0–6 is 3122, or 14.99% of the total population. In the entire Notified Area Council, the sex ratio is 954, lower than the state average of 976, however the child sex ratio is 971, equal to the state average of 970. The literacy rate of Lawngtlai is 95.66%, significantly higher than the state average of 91.33%. The male literacy rate is around 96.97% while female literacy rate is 94.28%.

== Transport ==
A helicopter service by Pawan Hans has been started, which connects Aizawl, the state capital, with Lawngtlai. The distance between the two cities through road is 296 km and is also connected by bus and jeeps. The state government has also proposed to extend the railway up to Lawngtlai. Lawngtlai will also be a node for the Kaladan Multi-Modal Transit Transport Project, which will link the town with Paletwa in Myanmar through a 62 kilometre highway.

== Media ==
The major newspapers in Lawngtlai include:

- Chhawkhlei Times
- Lai Aw
- Lai Ram
- The Lawngtlai Post
- Phawngpui Express
- Ram Eng
- The Lairam Times
