= Kaladan River =

Kaladan Chhimtuipui, Kissapanadi, Beino, Bawinu, Bawinung (Boinung)
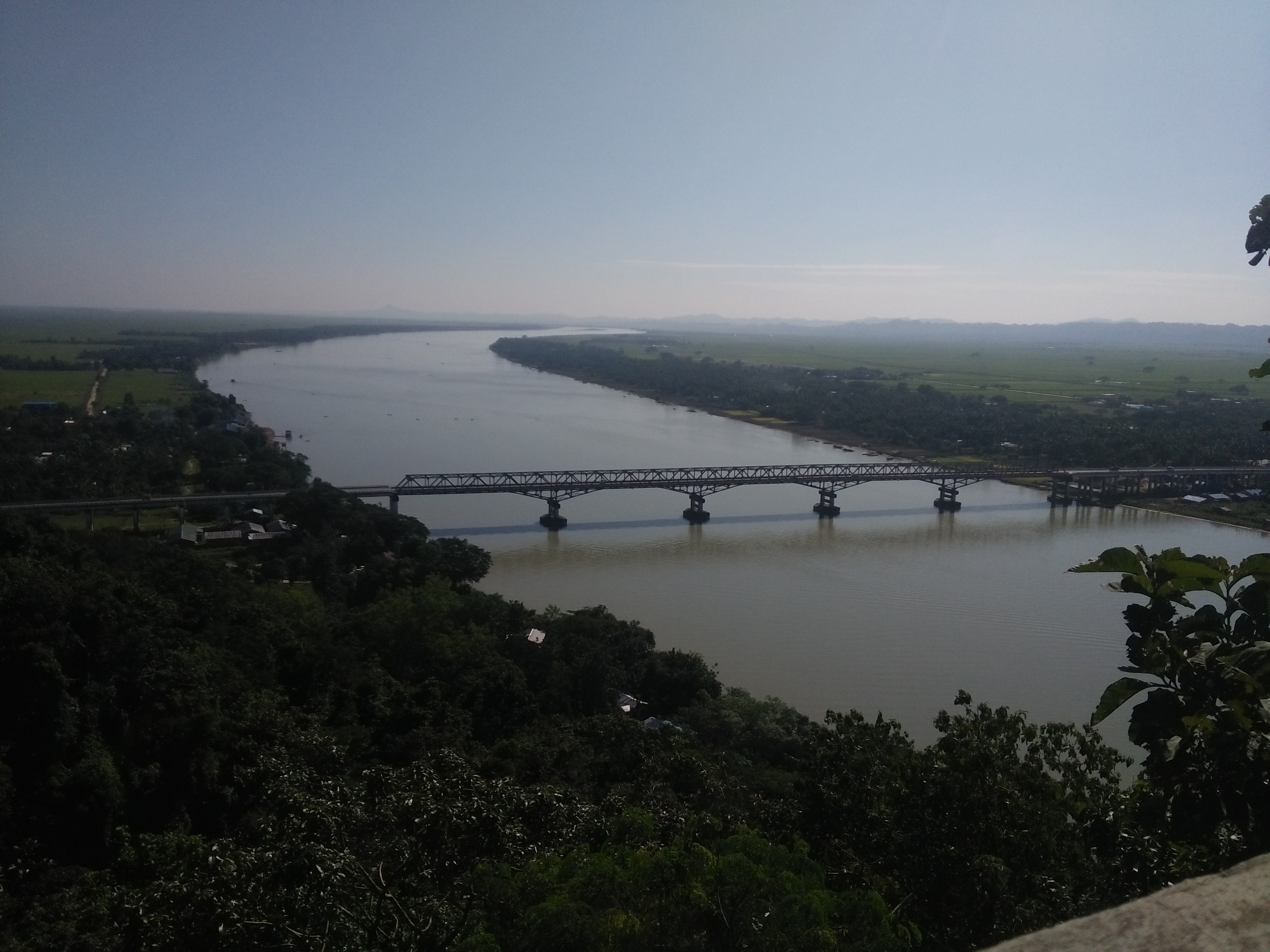
- View of the river at Kyauktaw in Myanmar.

Location
- Country: Myanmar, India
- State: Chin State, Rakhine State, Mizoram

Physical characteristics
- Source: west flank of Mount Zinghmuh
  - location: Chin Hills, Chin State, Myanmar
  - coordinates: 22°49′28″N 93°31′57″E
  - elevation: 2,564 m (8,412 ft)
- Mouth: Sittwe
  - location: Bay of Bengal, Myanmar
  - coordinates: 20°06′00″N 92°54′09″E
  - elevation: 0 m (0 ft)
- Length: 700 km (430 mi)
- Basin size: 40,000 km^{2} (15,000 mi^{2})
- Discharge
  - location: Kaladan Delta, Bay of Bengal
  - average: 3,476 m^{3}/s (122,800 cu ft/s)

Basin features
- Progression: Bay of Bengal
- River system: Kaladan River
- Tributaries
  - left: Twe, Mi, Kalabon, Kyegu
  - right: Chal, Tio, Tuichang, Mat, Kawrthingdeng

The Kaladan (Burmese: ကုလားတန်မြစ်, pronounced [kəládàɰ̃ mjɪʔ]) or Kissapanadi River (Burmese: ကစ္ဆပနဒီ, Kacchapanadī), also known as the Beino, Bawinu and Kolodyne, is a river in the eastern Mizoram State of India, and in Chin State and Rakhine State of western Myanmar. The Kaladan River is called the Chhimtuipui River in India. It forms the international border between India and Myanmar between 22° 47′ 10" N (where its tributary, the Tiau River, joins it) and 22° 11′ 06" N.

== History ==
Ancient Arakanese cities such as Dhanyawadi and Waithali were situated on the eastern bank of Kaladan River.

The Kaladan was an entry point to Mizoram from the seaport of Sittwe in 1904. The Kaladan is Mizoram's largest river, flowing through that state's southeastern region.

== Geography ==
The river arises in central Chin State as the Timit, 22°49′28″N 93°31′57″E, and flows south and is soon joined by the Chal, after which it is known as the Boinu River. It continues south until just before it is joined by the Twe River at 22°08′40″N 93°34′30″E, when it swings west. It continues west until 22°05′20″N 93°14′12″E, when it heads northwest. At 22°11′06″N 93°09′29″E, below Mount Phabipa, it turns north and becomes the international border between India and Myanmar. It flows north to 22°47′09″N 93°05′47″E, where the international border continues north along the Tyao River, and the Boinu heads northwest into Mizoram State, at which point it is known as the Kaladan.

At 22°56′21″N 92°58′55″E it reaches its northernmost point, and turns south west, is joined by the Tuichong River from the right and then heads south. The Kaladan is joined from the right by the Mat River at 22°43′39″N 92°54′46″E. It continues south and is joined by the Kawrthingdeng River from the right. It again enters Chin State, at Raithaw Ferry, 22°03′40″N 92°51′05″E, just northwest of Khenkhar. The Mi River joins from the left at 21°06′56″N 92°57′42″E. At Ngame the river enters the Rakhine State of Myanmar and continues south to Sittwe where it enters the Bay of Bengal.

== Development ==
At present, the Kaladan is the fifth largest river in the world that is completely unfragmented by dams anywhere in its catchment, behind only the Fly, Mamberamo and Sepik in New Guinea and the Pechora in Russia. Nonetheless, the governments of India and Myanmar are working on a US$500 million, Kaladan Multi-Modal Transit Transport Project that will facilitate trade between the two nations. The project includes the construction of the US$120 million deepwater Sittwe Port at the mouth of the river, dredging of the Kaladan River to enable cargo vessels to navigate the river from Sittwe to Mizoram, the construction of a river port at Paletwa, as well as the widening and upgrade of highways between Paletwa and Myeikwa on the Indo-Myanmar border. India undertook the development of the 158 km river boat route from Sittwe seaport to the Inland Water Terminal (IWT) and hydropower project at Paletwa jetty via the Kaladan River in Myanmar. River dredging and a jetty upgrade were completed in June 2017. There is at least one river lock for navigation. The project will open up not only Mizoram but all of India's northeastern states as hinterland for the Sittwe Port. Construction for the port started in 2010 and is expected to be completed by mid-2020.

Development of the river is also being negotiated with the Shwe Gas Project for economic enhancement.

== See also ==
- Kaladan Multi-Modal Transit Transport Project
- East-West Industrial Corridor Highway, Arunachal Pradesh
- Arunachal Border Highway
- Asian Highway Network
- India-Myanmar-Thailand Friendship Highway
