= Paletwa =

Paletwa ပလက်ဝမြို့
- Town
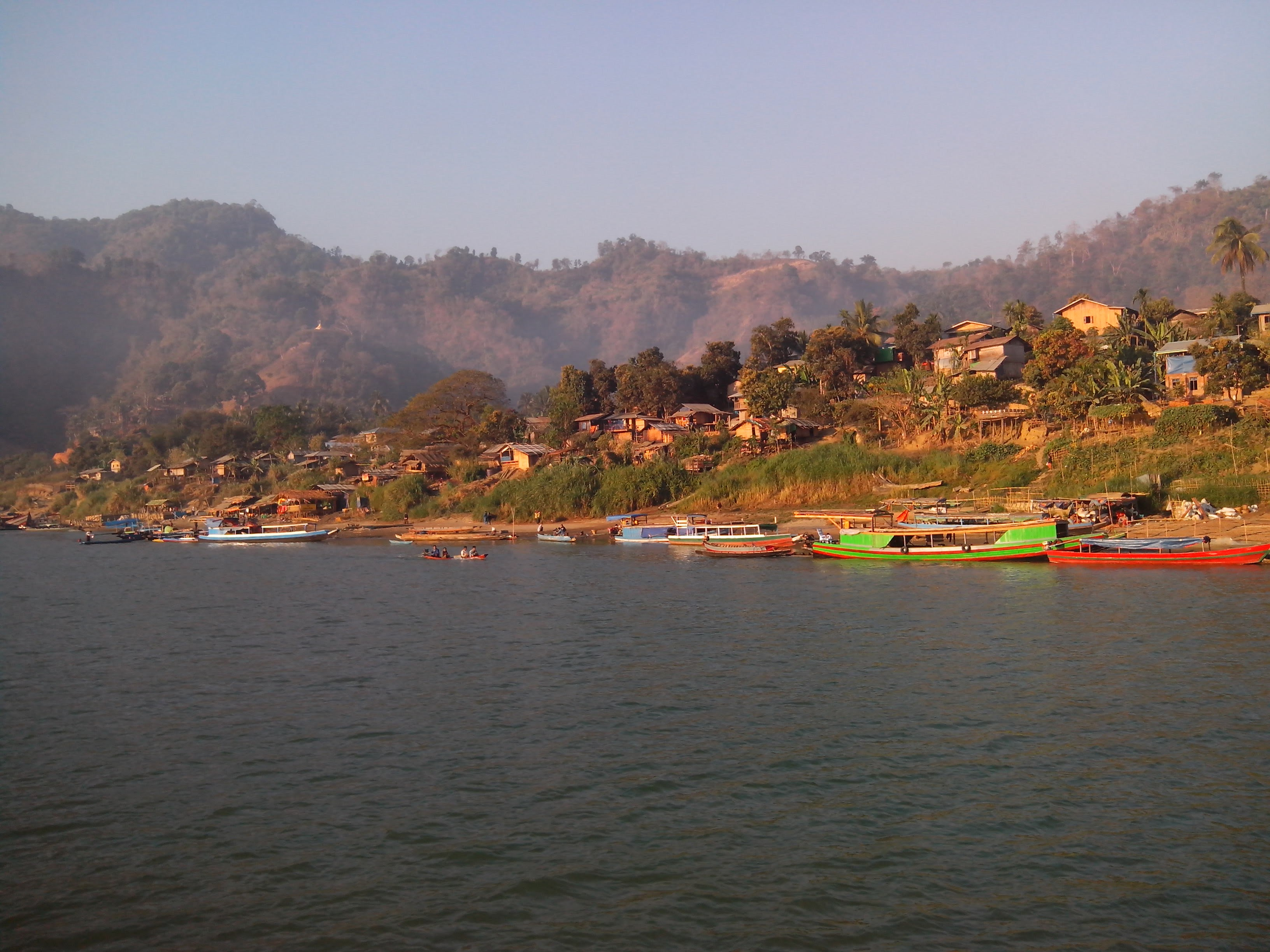

- Location in Myanmar
- Coordinates: 21°18′N 92°51′E
- Country: Myanmar
- State: Chin State
- District: Paletwa District
- Township: Paletwa Township

Area
  - Total: 1,368 sq mi (3,543 km^{2})

Population (2014)
  - Total: 96,899
  - Density: 70.83/sq mi (27.35/km^{2})
- Time zone: UTC+6.30 (MMT)
- Climate: Am

Paletwa (Burmese: ပလက်ဝမြို့, MLCTS: pa. lak wa. mrui., pronounced [pəlɛʔwa̰ mjo̰]) is one of the westernmost towns of Myanmar; in Chin State, located 18 kilometres (11 mi) from the border with Bangladesh. The town borders Mizoram in India and Chittagong Division of Bangladesh. Its population was about 97,000 in 2014.

The Arakan Army (AA) launched an attack at the town on 13 November 2023, and captured it on 15 January 2024 during the Myanmar Civil War.

== Demographics ==
Rakhine is the lingua franca of the region, while Kuki-Chin languages are spoken mostly in the hills. The western region of the town hosts a significant refugee population that has fled from Rakhine State. The literacy rate is 65% (2017).

Neighboring villages such as Kan Lay (ကန်းလေ) can be reached only by foot (journey time one hour).

== Connectivity ==
Paletwa Township is located in a strategically-important area. The nearby Bangladesh–India–Myanmar tripoint, is important for trade, illegal migration, and drug and weapon smuggling.

The area is connected to Rakhine State only by boat. A boat leaves Kyauktaw every morning and reaches Paletwa in the afternoon, running up the Kaladan River. The Kaladan river is prone to flooding during the monsoon season.

As of 2020, the road to Matupi is reported to be on the brink of completion, although this reporting does not match the situation on the ground.

Paletwa is part of an ongoing infrastructure project Kaladan Multi-Modal Transit Transport Project that will connect it to the Indian state of Mizoram. As of 2026, the road to Zorinpui is still incomplete. As a result, the Kaladan river is the only feasible way to reach Paletwa.

The ULA/AA has built inter-village roads in Paletwa Township to improve transport and boost trade to Mizoram State.

== Climate ==
The area receives heavy rain from the Southwest monsoon (May to October).
