= National Highway 502 (India) =

National highway in India

National Highway 502
- Map of National Highway 502 in red

Route information
- Length: 23 km (14 mi)

Major junctions
- From: Venus Saddle
- To: Saiha

Location
- Country: India
- States: Mizoram

Highway system
- Roads in India; Expressways; National; State; Asian
← NH 302	→ NH 502A

National Highway 502 or NH 502 connects Venus Saddle and Saiha in Mizoram, India. The total length of the highway is 23 km and runs only in the state of Mizoram.

== See also ==
- List of national highways in India
- National Highways Development Project
