= India–Myanmar border =

Border separating India and Myanmar

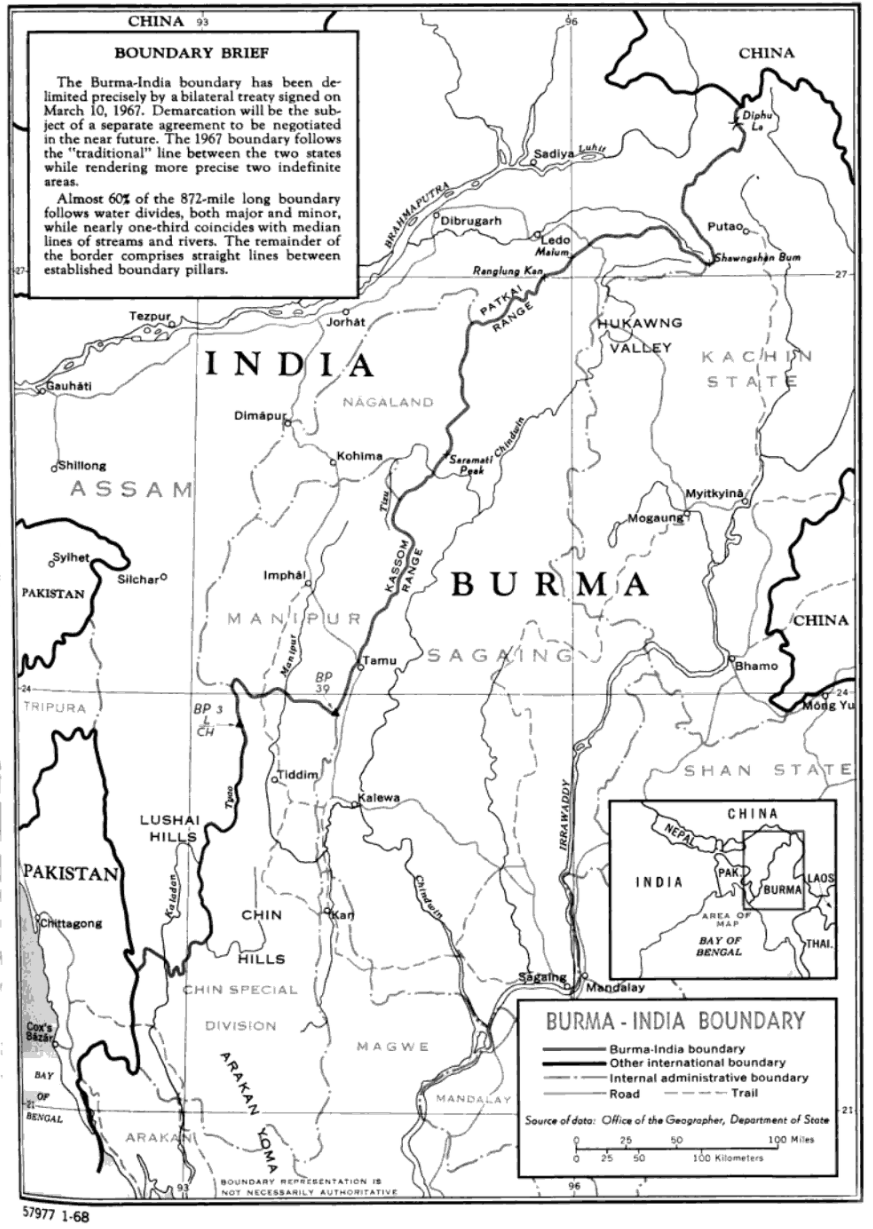
Map of the India-Myanmar border (the areas marked "Pakistan" are part of present-day Bangladesh)

The India–Myanmar border is the international border between India and Myanmar (formerly Burma). The 1,643 kilometres (1,021 mi) long border runs from the tripoint with China in the north to the tripoint with Bangladesh in the south. Geographically, the Indo-Burman Ranges stand as a physical barrier between the Indian subcontinent and Southeast Asian Massif.

== History ==
=== Early history ===
Various empires and states of India and Burma, as Indianised Hindu-Buddhist mandala of Greater India and Indosphere, have had changing borders going back several centuries.

=== 19–20th century: British colonial period ===
The first formation of the Indo-Burmese border during the British Raj was through the First Anglo-Burmese War, which resulted in the Treaty of Yandabo in 1826. The Burmese relinquished control over Assam, Manipur, Rakhine (Arakan), and the Tanintharyi coast, thereby delimiting much of the modern boundary in general terms. In 1834 the Kabaw Valley areas was returned to Burma and a modified boundary delimited the region called the 'Pemberton Line' after a British boundary commissioner, Robert Boileau Pemberton. In 1837 the Patkai Hills were unilaterally designated as the northern boundary.

Large swathes of Burma were annexed to the British Empire following the Second Anglo-Burmese War of 1852–53. The remainder of Burma was conquered in 1885 and incorporated into British India as a province.

The Pemberton Line was first refined in 1881. In 1894 a boundary between Manipur and the Chin Hills (recognised as part of Burma) was delimited, and the existing Pemberton boundary modified again in 1896. Further boundary modifications were made in 1901, 1921 and 1922.

In 1937 the British government split Burma from India and made it a separate colony. In 1947 India gained independence, however the country was partitioned into two states (India and Pakistan), with the southernmost section of the Burma-India border becoming that between Burma and East Pakistan (modern Bangladesh). Burma gained independence in 1948. On 10 March 1967 Burma and India signed a boundary treaty which delimited their common frontier in detail. Security along the border has often been poor, owing to ongoing conflicts in north-east India and western Myanmar.

=== Post-independence of India and Myanmar ===
==== 1948–2024: FMR (Free Movement Regime) ====
The India–Myanmar border previously had a Free Movement Regime (FMR), allowing border tribes to travel visa-free up to 16 km (9.9 mi) across, which was terminated by Indian government in February 2024 due to 2023–2025 Manipur violence and rampant illegal cross-border activities. This facilitated movement for over 300,000 people in border villages, rooted in historical economic and cultural ties acknowledged by both nations through reciprocal passport rule amendments in 1948–50, permitting travel within 40 km (25 mi) with short stays. Initially unrestricted, India introduced a permit system in 1968 due to insurgencies, and later, in 2004, limited the travel distance to 16 km (9.9 mi) and designated three crossing points due to rising drug and arms trafficking. A formal Land Border Crossing Agreement in 2018 required border passes for residents within 16 kilometres (9.9 mi) with a 14-day stay limit. Amidst the violence, insurgency and rampant illegal cross-border activities, the Indian government terminated the FMR in February 2024, facing opposition from Mizoram government and some civil society groups.

== Border ==
=== Description ===
The trijunction of India, China and Myanmar is not yet agreed among the three nations. The de facto tripoint is located just north of the Diphu Pass in Kibithu sector. From here the border proceeds to the south-west through the Mishmi Hills, except for an Indian protrusion at the Chaukan Pass entailing Vijaynagar valley, then continuing through the Patkai and Kassom Ranges. At the south-east corner of Manipur it turns sharply westwards along various rivers for a period over to the Tiau River. It then follows this river southwards for a long stretch down to the Chin Hills, before turning west and proceeding to the Bangladeshi tripoint via a series of irregular lines.

=== Barrier ===
The India–Myanmar barrier, a border barrier along 1,624-kilometre (1,009 mi)-long border under-construction by India, aims to seal the border, curtail cross-border crime, including goods, arms and counterfeit currency smuggling, drug trafficking, and insurgency. Four Northeast Indian states share the border with Myanmar, i.e. Arunachal Pradesh, Nagaland, Mizoram, and Manipur. Both national governments agreed to conduct a joint survey before erecting the fence. The Indian Home Ministry and its Myanmar counterpart completed the study within six months and in March 2003 began erecting a fence along the border. In 2024, India approved ₹30,000 crore (US$3.5 billion) for the construction of border fence along the Myanmar border. Of the total, 1,624-kilometre (1,009 mi) length, only 30 km was fenced by September 2024, remaining was being expedited. BRO will complete this work over 10 years by 2035-36.

Issues have been raised that many local ethnic communities, such as the Kuki, Naga, Mizo, and Chins whose lands straddle the regions between the two countries, will be divided by this fence. However, the Indian security forces justify the need for the fence by blaming the porous border as a national security threat. For example, during two-year period between 2001 and 2003 alone 200 security personnel and civilians died in the militancy-related violence in the region, and in 2007 a violent boundary dispute arose among the locals regarding the ownership of nine border pillars in Manipur. India has similar fence on borders with Pakistan and Bangladesh.

=== Border crossings ===
Category	State	Border Crossing	Details
International (Integrated immigration and customs check post (ICP), open to all international travelers with valid passports and visa)	Manipur	Moreh (India) – Tamu (Myanmar)	Lies on the India–Myanmar–Thailand Trilateral Highway (IMT Highway).
International (Integrated immigration and customs check post (ICP), open to all international travelers with valid passports and visa)	Mizoram	Zochawchhuah (India) – Zorinpui (Myanmar)	Lies on Kaladan Multi-Modal Transit Transport Project. It is 287 km (178 mi) away from Sittwe Port and 90 km (56 mi) from Lawngtlai (Mizoram) on Aizawl-Saiha National Highway NH-2 which continues further to Dabaka in Assam via the 850 km (530 mi) route part of the larger East-West Corridor connecting North East India with the rest of India.
Local FMR crossing only	Arunachal Pradesh	Diphu Pass	Lies 30 km east of Dong, Arunachal Pradesh, and north of Pangsau Pass.
Local FMR crossing only	Arunachal Pradesh	Nampong-Pangsau Pass (India) near Lake of No Return (Myanmar)	Via NH-315 (Ledo Road), which is part of Stilwell Road.
Local FMR crossing only	Manipur	Behiang to Khenman	Provides access to Tedim in Myanmar.
Local FMR crossing only	Mizoram	Zokhawthar (India) to Khawmawi-Rikhawdar (Myanmar)	Via Harhva river bridge; local and informal use.

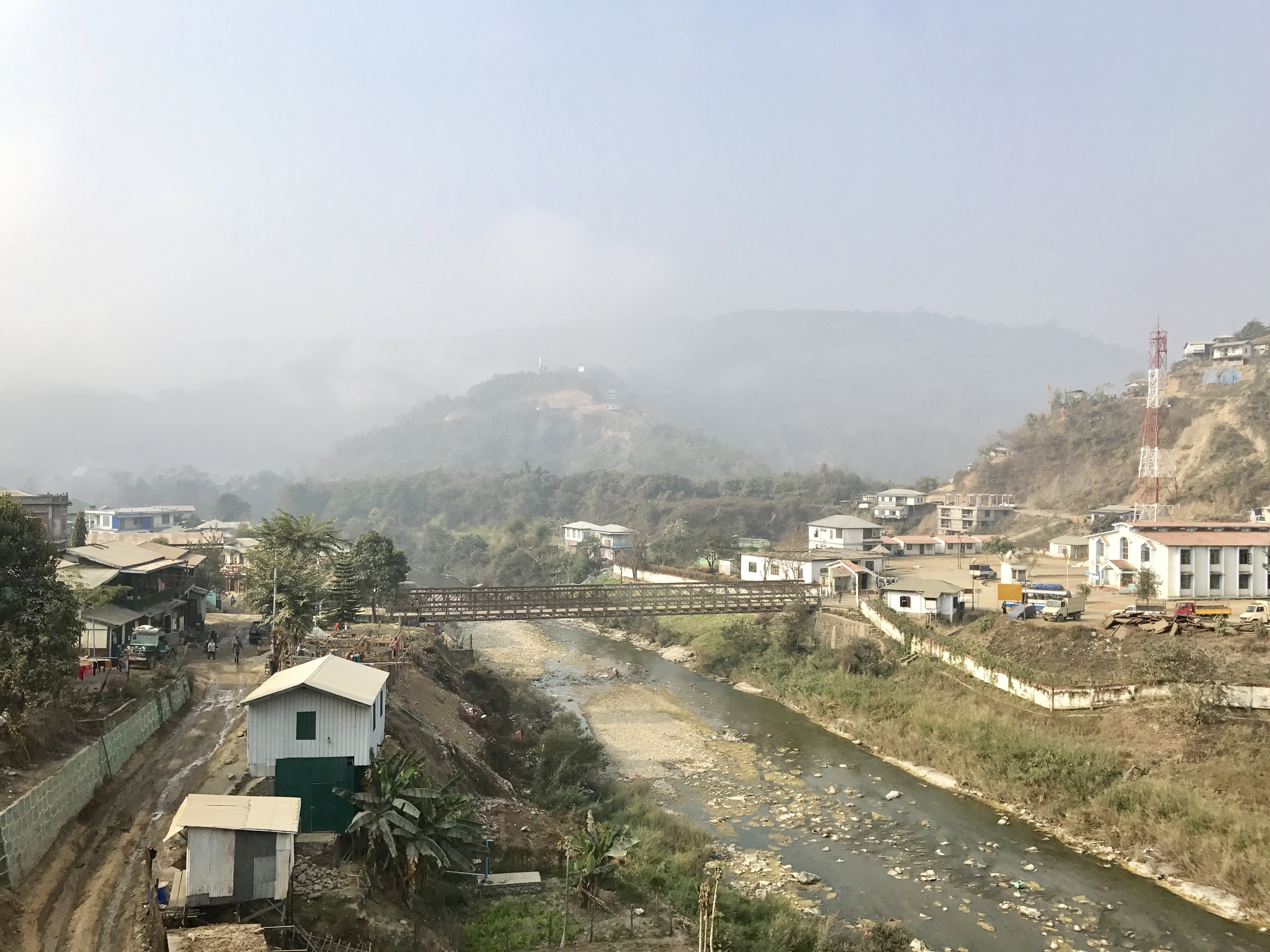
Rickhawdar (left;Myanmar)- Zokhawthar (right;India) border crossing

=== Border force ===
The Indo-Myanmar Border Force (IMBF) is a proposed and soon-to-be-composed force of 29 battalions - 25 battalions from Assam Rifles and 4 battalions from Indo-Tibetan Border Police - to guard the 1,643-kilometre (1,021 mi) long Indo-Myanmar border. IMBF will remain under ITBP and will patrol the border to the zero line (as of January 2018).

=== Border markets ===
See Haats on India-Myanmar border.

== Maritime boundaries ==
India and Myanmar have maritime exclusive economic zones in each other's vicinity. Landfall Island, India's northernmost Island in Andaman and Nicobar is 40 kilometres (25 mi) south of Coco Islands belonging to Myanmar.

== See also ==
- India–Myanmar relations
- Bangladesh–Myanmar border
