= Zote (village) =

Village in Champhai, Mizoram, India

Coordinates: 23.497°N 93.3563°E

Zote is a village in Champhai block of Champhai District, Mizoram state, India.

== Etymology ==
Zote are one of the clans of the Hmar people who are believed to first settle here. So the name of the village came to be known as "Zote".

== Economy ==
Zote is one of the 4 Border Haats (markets) in Mizoram, others being at Hnahlan, Vaphai (Saikhumphai) and Sangau (Pangkhua), all of which boost the local trade and economy. As part of India's Look-East connectivity, entailing connectivity to BIMSTEC, East Asia Summit, Mekong-Ganga Cooperation, United Nations Economic and Social Commission for Asia and the Pacific, Asian Highway Network and the Trans-Asian Railway, Zote as a border town has a role to play.

== Transport and connectivity ==
=== Border checkpost, customs and immigration ===
Zokhawthar LCS (Land Custom Station), There is a proposal to upgrade it to ICP (Integrated Check Point) entailing immigration and customs both. is 28 km south of Zote on Look-East connectivity.

=== Airport and railway ===
Lengpui Airport in Aizawl (223 km northwest) is the nearest airport in India. Sairang railhead of Bairabi–Sairang line is the nearest railway station.

=== AH1 and India-Thailand Highway ===
India–Myanmar–Thailand Trilateral Highway (IMT), and Asian Highway Network and Asian Highway 1 (AH1) Zokhawthar-Tedim connectivity to IMT will provide an alternate route to the existing route via Moreh. via Zokhawthar provide wider connectivity to Zote.

== See also ==
- Borders of India
