= Zokhawthar =

- village
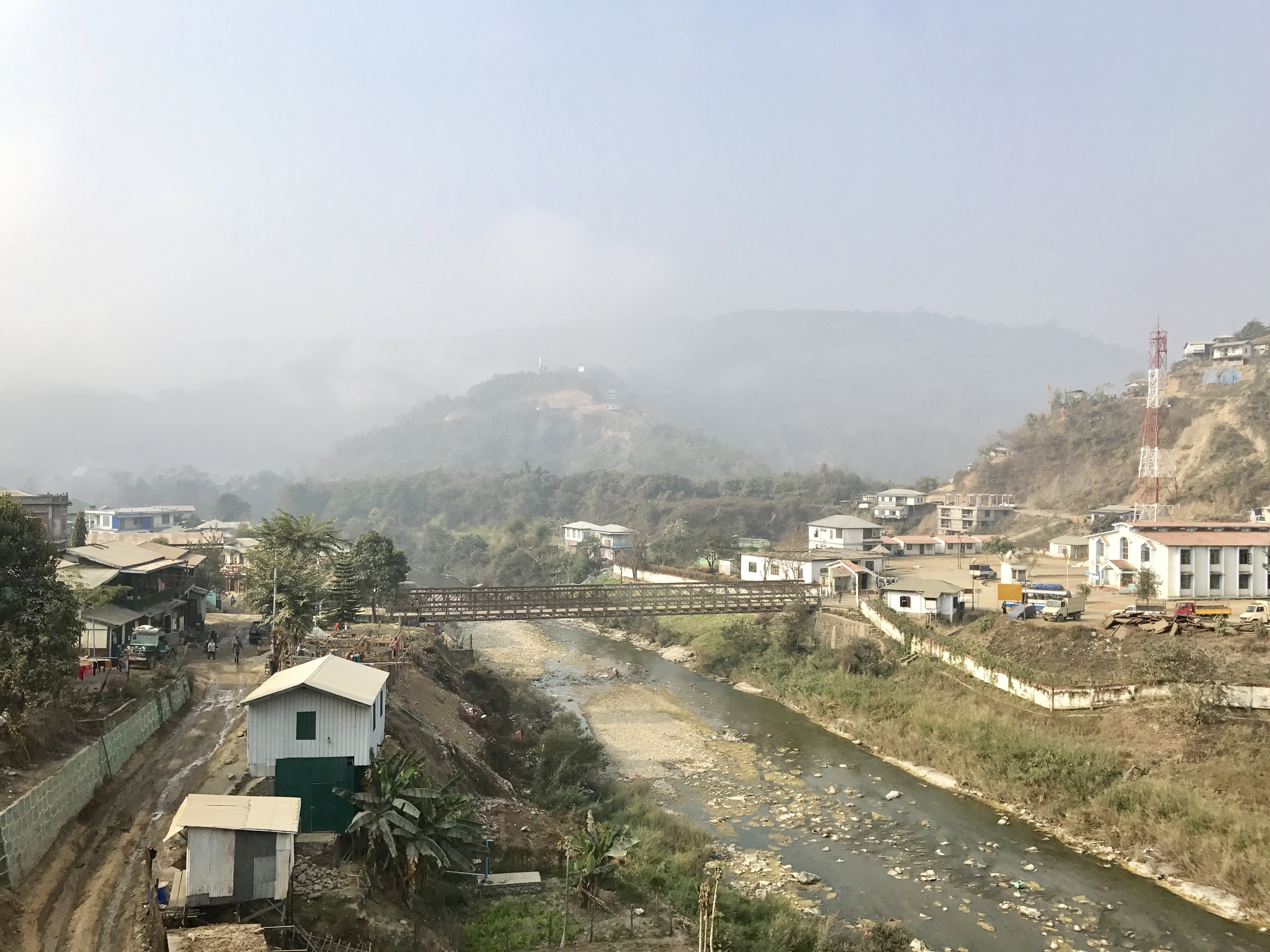
- Zokhawdar on the right and Rihkhawdar in Myanmar on the left

- Location in Mizoram, India Zokhawthar (India)
- Coordinates: 23.3652465°N 93.3855078°E
- Country: India
- State: Mizoram
- District: Champhai
- Block: Khawzawl
- Elevation: 735 m (2,411 ft)

Population (2011)
  - Total: 2,632
- Time zone: UTC+5:30 (IST)
- 2011 census code: 271338

Zokhawthar is a border town in the Champhai district of Mizoram state of India.

== Demographics ==
According to the 2011 census of India, Zokhawthar has 501 households. The effective literacy rate (i.e. the literacy rate of population excluding children aged 6 and below) is 93.58%.

Demographics (2011 Census)
	Total	Male	Female
Population	2632	1299	1333
Children aged below 6 years	498	249	249
Scheduled caste	1	1	0
Scheduled tribe	2569	1260	1309
Literates	1997	1006	991
Workers (all)	994	642	352
Main workers (total)	848	582	266
Main workers: Cultivators	156	125	31
Main workers: Agricultural labourers	278	205	73
Main workers: Household industry workers	29	13	16
Main workers: Other	385	239	146
Marginal workers (total)	146	60	86
Marginal workers: Cultivators	13	8	5
Marginal workers: Agricultural labourers	36	22	14
Marginal workers: Household industry workers	19	7	12
Marginal workers: Others	78	23	55
Non-workers	1638	657	981

== Transport and border connectivity ==
India is part of BIMSTEC, East Asia Summit, Mekong-Ganga Cooperation, United Nations Economic and Social Commission for Asia and the Pacific, Asian Highway Network and the Trans-Asian Railway network and India has embarked on several Look-East connectivity projects.

Mizoram has an unfenced international border with Myanmar (404 km), guarded by Border Security Force (BSF), and Bangladesh (318 km), guarded by Assam Rifles. India and Myanmar have set up 4 Border Haats (markets) in Mizoram at Hnahlan, Zote, Vaphai (Saikhumphai) and Sangau (Pangkhua) to boost the local trade and economy. Indian has set up 5 ICP (Integrated Check Posts) Mizoram at Kawrpuichhuah, Marpara, Tuipuibari, Silsuri and Nunsury.

=== Border checkpost, customs and immigration ===
Zokhawthar LCS (Land Custom Station) was opened on the Indo-Myanmar border in August 2018. It is one of the two such check-posts in the state of Mizoram. There is a proposal to upgrade it to ICP (Integrated Check Point) entailing immigration and customs both.

=== Airport and railway ===
Lengpui Airport in Aizawl (242 km northwest of Moreh) is the nearest airport in India. Sairang railhead of Bairabi–Sairang line is the nearest railway station.

=== AH1 and India-Thailand Highway ===
India plans to upgrade route from Zokhawthar in Mizoram to Tedim in Chin State of Myanmar as an additional connect to the planned India–Myanmar–Thailand Trilateral Highway (IMT), which is part of Asian Highway Network and Asian Highway 1 (AH1) passes through Moreh in Manipur. Zokhawthar-Tedim connectivity to IMT will provide an alternate route to the existing route via Moreh.

== See also ==
- Borders of India
