= North-East India security fence =

Planned fence

The North-East India security fence is a planned 1643 km-long smart fencing system to border India's Arunachal Pradesh, Nagaland, Manipur, and Mizoram along India's northeastern border.

The Indian Ministry of Home Affairs in its 2022–2023 MHA annual report announced that the government was considering canceling a free movement arrangement to safeguard the internal security and demographic structure of the northeastern states. The agreement had been in place for six years and allowed border inhabitants from India and Myanmar to enter each other's countries for up to 16 kilometers without a visa.

== History ==
The governments of India and Myanmar established the Free Movement Regime in the 1970s to protect the customary rights of the predominantly tribal communities living along their borders while also promoting trade between like-tribes.

When India's central government's announced that the border between India and Myanmar would be gated, similar to the border between Bangladesh and India, prompted the United Naga Council made demands.

Intelligence reports suggest that the situation in Manipur is exacerbated by insurgent groups from the northeastern region, who use camps in Myanmar and cross into India. The Manipur government urged the central government to fence the border with Myanmar and to revoke the FMR.

Rebel organizations, including Meitei, Naga, Kuki, Zomi, and Hmar, are active in Manipur. As of August 2008, the Government of India had placed 23 rebel groups—the United Peoples' Front, which comprises eight, and the Kuki National Organization, which comprises fifteen—under Suspension of Operation (SoO).

Minister of Home Affairs Amit Shah decided to terminate the Free Movement Regime (FMR) between that country and Myanmar.

The Border Roads Organisation (BRO) was given the task of building a 10 km border barrier in Moreh, Manipur.

The proposal yielded a mixed response from five North-Eastern states.

== See also ==
- Borders of India
- East and Southeast Asian relations with Northeast India
