= Moreh, India =

International border town in Manipur, India

Moreh
- Town, sub-division
- Interactive map of Moreh
- Location in Manipur, India Moreh (India)
- Coordinates: 24.2477°N 94.3031°E
- Country: India
- State: Manipur
- District: Tengnoupal
- Established: 1829
- Founder: Gambhir Singh

Population (2011)
  - Total: 16,847

Language(s)
  - Official: Meitei (Manipuri) (Note: Meitei language (officially known as Manipuri language) is the official language of Manipur. Other regional languages of different places in Manipur may either be predominantly spoken or not in their respective places but "Meitei" is always officially used.)
  - Regional: Thadou and other Kuki-Chin languages
- Time zone: UTC+5:30 (IST)
- Postal code: 795131
- Vehicle registration: MN
- Website: manipur.gov.in

Moreh (Meitei pronunciation: /mō-rey/) is a border town located on the India–Myanmar border in Tengnoupal district of the Indian state of Manipur at the entrance of the Kabaw Valley. As a rapidly developing international trade point with the integrated customs and international immigration checkpoint, Moreh plays an important role in India's Look East Policy, trade and commerce under ASEAN–India Free Trade Area, India-Myanmar relationship, India–Myanmar–Thailand road connectivity, and Trans-Asian Railway connectivity.

Tamu in Myanmar, just across the Menal river from Moreh, is connected to Moreh via two roads: The Indo-Myanmar Friendship Bridge and a newer Moreh ICP Bridge which connects the Moreh Integrated Check Post (Moreh ICP). Tamu in Myanmar connects Moreh in India to Kalewa-Yagyi-Mandalay in Myanmar and Mae Sot in Thailand through the India–Myanmar–Thailand Trilateral Highway.

== Name ==
According to the Hill Tribal Council of Moreh, the original name of the town was "Mollenphai", with "Mollen" as the short form. The 19th century British documents spelt the name as "Moray" and "Moreh".

== History ==
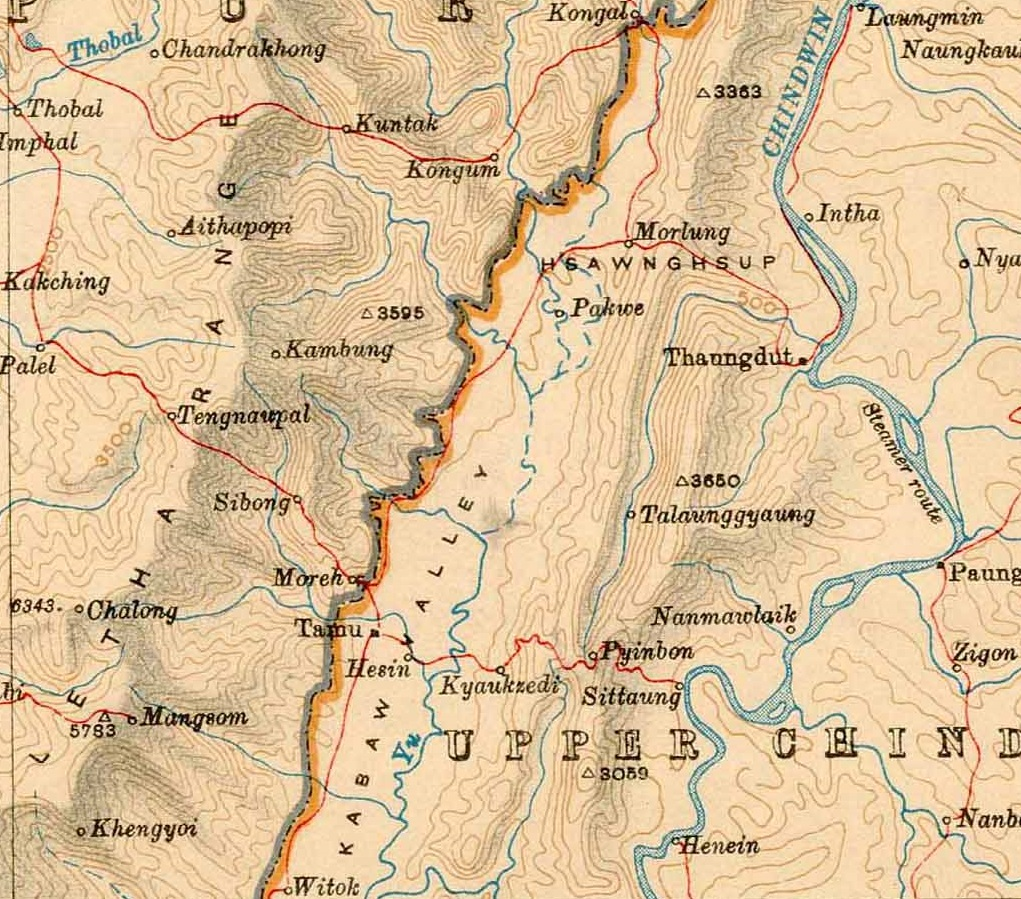
Moreh and Tamu in Kabaw Valley (Survey of India, 1924)

The 1888 Gazetteer of Manipur describes Moreh as a border post (thana) of Manipur, northwest of the town of Tamu. Tamu is a principal town of the Kabaw Valley, on the bank of the Lokchao River flowing down from Manipur hills (in present day Tengnoupal district). Kabaw Valley had been under the control of Manipur kingdom since the 15th century, and Tamu appears to have grown up as a market town in the valley, overshadowing Khampat, the previous capital of the southern principality in Kabaw valley.

In 1764, the Burmese emperor Alaungpaya invaded Manipur via Tamu. Afterwards, the Kabaw Valley appears to have changed hands between Manipur and Burma several times until 1813 when the Manipur prince Marjit Singh ceded it to Burma in return for Burmese assistance in acquiring his throne. During the First Anglo-Burmese War, the next prince Gambhir Singh reoccupied the Kabaw Valley, but the British returned it to Burma in 1834 as part of the post-war settlement.

In 1829, shortly before the final cession of the Kabaw Valley, Gambhir Singh is recorded to have "barricaded" the Lokchao gorge and established a new village in its vicinity. The "barricade" is likely to have been the Moreh thana stockade mentioned in the Gazetteer of Manipur, which was located on elevated ground between the Lokchao valley and the Moreh valley. The elevated ground is actually the flat end of a spur that runs between the two valleys. The Moreh valley houses two streams called Kujierok and Lierok which unite in the valley and join the Lokchao River further downstream. During the border settlement of 1834, the Moreh thanna and the village were allocated to Manipur and Tamu was allocated to Burma. Another village called Namphalong later sprung up opposite Moreh on the Burmese side of the border.

A road from Lamting to Tamu, passing through Pallel and Moreh was laid in 1878. Referred to as the "Tamu Road" or "Pallel–Moreh route", the road crossed the upstream portion of Lokchao River (in Manipur) near a village called Sibong (coordinates: 24.3232°N 94.2341°E). Sibong, originally called "Sitpong", is a much older village than Moreh, and listed with a population of 150 people dominated by Anals in the Gazetteer of Manipur. The Hill Tribal Council of Moreh regards Sibong as the parent village of Moreh. Being a river crossing, Sibong is also a strategic point for military purposes.

In 1891, there was a palace rebellion in Manipur, and the British, who were by now in control of the whole of Burma, sent in forces stationed at Tamu to relieve the captives taken by rebels. After a brief battle, Manipur was converted into a princely state of the British Empire.

For most of the British Raj period, Moreh remained a mere police post (thana). Indian traders went to Tamu and beyond to sell their goods and Moreh did not have any significance.

The rise of Moreh took place during the World War II, when it was developed into an administrative and supply centre for the Allied Forces, with Sibong set up as a rear headquarters. The Moreh base was held till April 1944, after which it was evacuated since the Japanese forces broke through in the north of the Kabaw Valley. After the war, a bazar was opened at Moreh since it was now a border point. A police post was also established according to a Manipur Administration Report.

=== Post-independence history ===
After the British departure from India and Burma, many Indians that had settled in Burma during the British period ("Burmese Indians") returned to India. Some of them settled down in Moreh. Prior to this, it is said that Moreh was nothing more than a "border outpost". With the arrival of Burmese Indians, Moreh acquired a cosmopolitan character with many ethnicities such as Tamilians, Malayalees, Punjabis, Bengalis and Nepalese along with the local Meitei, Kuki and Naga populations. In 1988, The Telegraph described Moreh as a cosmopolitan town with 15,000 people, 80 percent of whom were expatriates from Burma. (Note: That would amount to 12,000 people. It may have been an overestimate, since in 2011, the non-Manipuri Indian language speakers numbered under 3,000.) Also relevant is the "Khadawmi operation" of the Burmese military government in 1967, during which Kukis that were then living in the Kabaw Valley were evicted by the Burmese as they were regarded as Indian refugees from Manipur. They settled in Moreh and the surrounding areas of Tengnoupal district. According to scholar Thongkholal Haokip, many of these Kukis had been previously displaced from the Naga-dominated areas of Manipur such as the Ukhrul district.

In 1992, the Kuki–Naga clashes began in Moreh. At that time, the Naga insurgent group NSCN-IM dominated the Moreh town and the surrounding Tengnoupal–Chandel district. NSCN-IM was collecting "house tax" from the local Kukis and, over time, the demands for such taxes grew stronger. By 1992, the Kukis had their own militant organisation Kuki National Army (KNA), which was based in Tamu. The Kukis of Moreh are said to have invited the KNA to come to Moreh to ward off NSCN-IM. The Old Kuki tribes resident in Moreh, including the dominant Anals, had previously accepted a Naga identiy. The KNA commander asked them to stop supporting NSCN-IM. But the tribes felt unable to do so and left the town. The conflict itself started when NSCN-IM captured two Kuki student leaders, who were allegedly carrying messages for KNA, and killed one of them. This led to a full-scale war between the two groups and spread throughout Manipur. Commentators also state that the main driving force for the conflict was the control of the smuggling trade through Moreh.

== Demography ==
Languages of Moreh (2011)
1. Thado (41.9%)
2. Manipuri (25.1%)
3. Hindi (6.72%)
4. Tamil (5.25%)
5. Zou (3.85%)
6. Kuki (2.70%)
7. Mizo (2.65%)
8. Others (11.8%)
Religions of Moreh (2011).
1. Christians (56.7%)
2. Hindus (26.1%)
3. Muslims (14.0%)
4. Buddhists (0.65%)
5. Sikhs (0.34%)
6. No Religion Specified (0.20%)
7. Others (2.04%)

Moreh is in Tengnoupal district in Manipur with a sizeable number of Tamils and other Indians. The local population includes Kuki-Zo tribals and Meiteis, with small numbers Nagas and Old Kuki/Naga people.

In the 2011 India census, Moreh had a population of 16,847. Scheduled Tribes numbered 9,475, forming 56.92% of the population. Scheduled Castes were 0.2% of the population. Males were 8,670 while 8,177 were females. 14.58% of the population was under 6 years of age. The female sex ratio was 943 compared with the state average of 985. The child sex ratio was around 985 compared with the Manipur state average of 930.

=== Languages ===
The predominant languages in Moreh are Thadou (a Kuki-Chin language) and Meitei (also called Manipuri). The town is multi-ethnic, with other prominent languages like Hindi, Tamil, Zou, and Mizo, etc., and others. It has a substantial population of Tamils who migrated from Myanmar (Burma) when they were forced to leave during the 1962 Burmese coup d'état.

Of the tribal languages, the Kuki-Zo language speakers are 56.73%, Naga language speakers are 0.25%, Old Kuki/Naga language speakers are 0.4%, and other tribal language speakers form 0.4%. (Note: The Kuki-Zo tribes include Gangte, Hmar, Paite, Simte, Sukte, Thadou, Vaiphei, Zou, and some smaller tribes designated as "Any Kuki" and "Any Lushai (Mizo)". The Naga tribes include Angami, Kabui, Kacha Naga, Mao, Maram, Poumai, Sema and Tangkhul. The Old Kuki tribes retaining the Kuki classification include: Aimol, Chiru, Kom, Koireng, Kharam, and Ralte. The tribes under the Naga umbrella include: Anal, Chothe, Koirao, Lamkang, Maring, Moyon, Monsang, Purum and Tarao.) Among non-tribals, Meitei language speakers are 25.15%, and other general Indian language speakers are 17.35%.

=== Religion ===
According to 2011 Indian census, the town of Moreh is a multi-religious town and the Christians getting the clear majority. there are 4,403 being Hindus, 2,354 being Muslims, 9,547 being Christians, 57 being Sikhs, 109 being Buddhists, 17 being Jains, 33 didn't specify any Religion, 327 Others.

=== Literacy ===
Moreh had an average literacy rate of 71.47%, which is lower than the Manipur's average literacy rate of 76.94%: male literacy was around 79.52%, which was higher than the state average of 76.94%, and female literacy was 62.88% which was again lower than the state average of 70.26%

== Economy ==
Moreh serves as the crossing point in the trilateral international connectivity of India, Myanmar and Thailand

Being a border trade and transit town, Moreh plays a key role in the development of the economy of the state with border haat as well as international trade. A significant portion of the economy of Moreh depends on smuggling, including illegal teak smuggled from Myanmar.

=== Border haat ===
Moreh has the local Border Haat trade, under the India-Myanmar Barter Trade mechanism, in which over 40 tradable items are listed. Major exports include cement, engineering goods, transport equipment, motor cycles, iron and steels, medicine, chemicals and allied products, cotton yarn, etc. The major items now imported from Myanmar through barter mechanism are betel nuts, turmeric, red kidney beans (Rajma), kuth roots, gram, resin, dry ginger, etc.

=== International trade ===
India's Ministry of Finance has also operationalised the "normal international trade" through Moreh Integrated Check Post (Moreh ICP).

== Transport ==
India is part of BIMSTEC, East Asia Summit, Mekong-Ganga Cooperation, United Nations Economic and Social Commission for Asia and the Pacific, Asian Highway Network and the Trans-Asian Railway network and India has embarked on several Look-East connectivity projects.

=== Integrated Check Post (ICP) ===
Moreh ICP, costing Rs. 136 crores on 18.41 hectares (45.50 acres) land near Gate No.1 within Customs notified area, facilitates speedy movement of export-import consignments under India's Look East Policy. ICP has Immigration Department, Narcotics & Drug Control Department, Land Customs Department, Customs Preventive Department, Animal Quarantine, Plant Quarantine, local Police including Women Constables, Quality Certification Inspection Agencies and Export Promotion Councils, Trade Facilitation Counter and Trade related Public Bodies, Food Testing Lab, Postal Department, Forests Department, bank counter, telecom, truck parking, staff quarters, basic amenities such as canteen, truck drivers’ rest house, etc.

=== Airport ===
Imphal Airport (110 km northwest of Moreh) is the nearest airport in India. Homalin Airport (120 km north) and Kalaymyo Airport (133 km south) are the nearest airport in Myanmar.

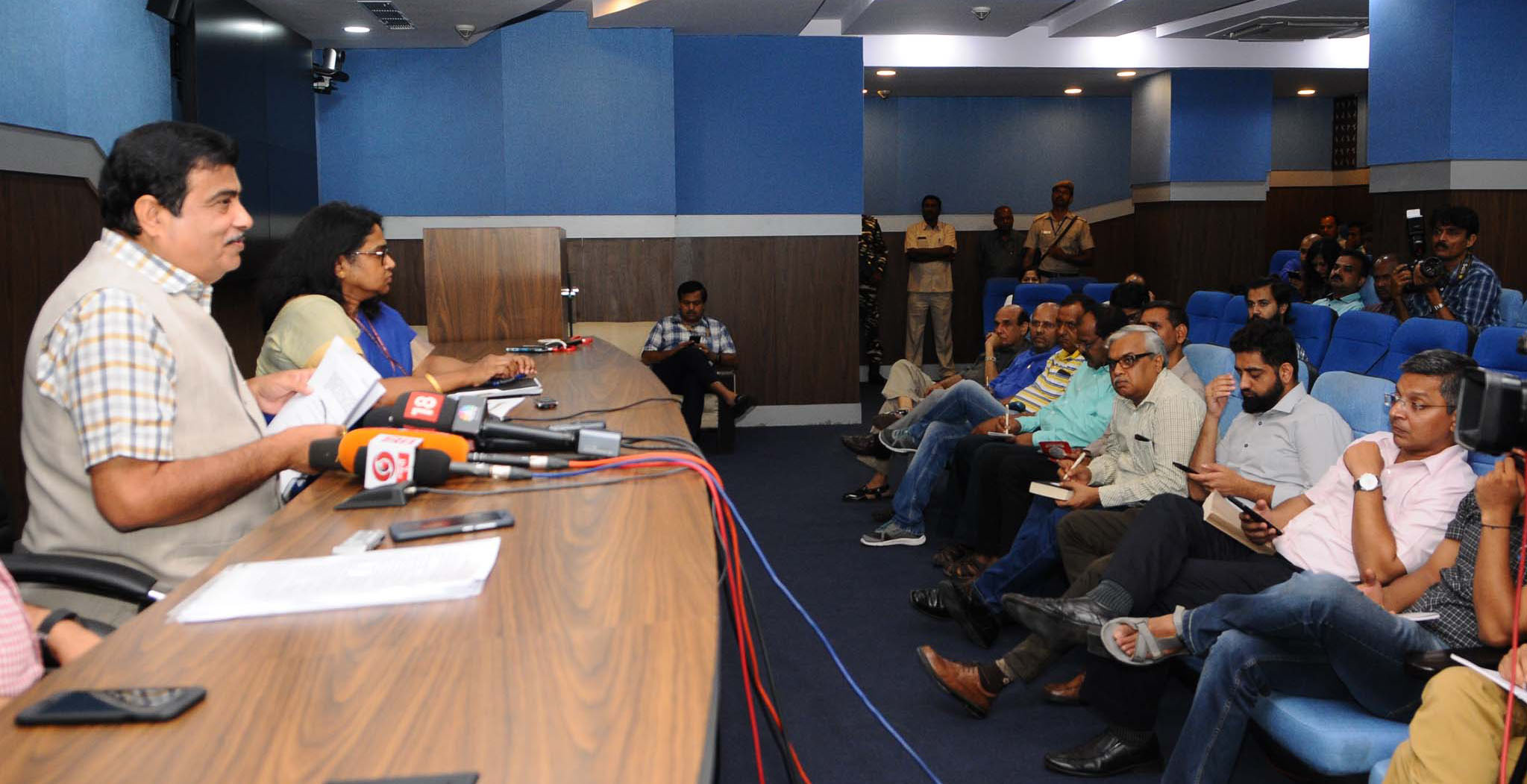
Media briefing in New Delhi on Imphal-Moreh NH-102 upgrade, 2017.

=== AH1 and India-Thailand Highway ===
Moreh is on the Asian Highway 1 (AH1), which is the longest route of the Asian Highway Network, running 20,557 km (12,774 mi) from Tokyo, Japan via Korea, China, Southeast Asia, Bangladesh, India, Pakistan, Afghanistan and Iran to the border between Turkey and Bulgaria west of Istanbul where it joins end-on with European route E80, running all the way to Lisbon, Portugal.

India–Myanmar–Thailand Trilateral Highway, 1,408 km (875 mi) long section of AH1, connects Imphal-Moreh in India with Mae Sot in Thailand via Mandalay-Kalewa-Yagyi in Myanmar. It will boost India's trade and commerce with ASEAN under ASEAN–India Free Trade Area. Imphal-Moreh route Its upgrade was already complete by 2017, however it is further being upgraded to Asian Highway Standard in 3 packages, one of which was complete and remaining two are scheduled for completion by 2023. In November 2020, Bangladesh expressed interest to join this Highway. India plans to upgrade route from Zokhawthar in Mizoram to Tedim in Chin State of Myanmar as an additional connect to the IMT trilateral highway.

=== Trans-Asian Railway ===
Trans-Asian Railway's (TAR) Southern Corridor (also called ITI-DKD-Y), once completed, will connect Yunnan in China and Thailand with Europe via India and Turkey. As of 2021, all freight traffic from Asia to Europe goes by sea. TAR will enable containers from Singapore, China, Vietnam, Cambodia, India, Bangladesh, Myanmar, Thailand and Korea to travel over land by train to Europe. The proposed route will enter India at Moreh from Tamu in Myanmar, then enter Bangladesh through Mahisasan and Shahbajpur and again enter India from Bangladesh at Gede. On the western side, the line will enter Pakistan at Attari.

To bridge the missing gap in the TAR's ITI-DKD-Y route, India and Myanmar plan to interconnect their railway networks via a 346 km (215 mi) line that will extend under-construction Jiribam-Imphal line to Moreh-Tamu border and then to existing Kalay railhead in Myanmar. 180 kilometres (110 mi) of the missing link, from Jiribam to Moreh-Tamu on Myanmar border, falls in India, out of which 110 kilometres (68 mi) Jiribam–Imphal line is under construction, and remaining 70 kilometres (43 mi) Imphal-Moreh line is under planning. Japan was conducting feasibility for the 166 kilometres (103 mi) Moreh-Tamu-Kalay link in Myanmar.

==== Jiribam–Imphal line ====
Jiribam–Imphal line, 111 km long line, has a likely completion date of December 2023 as per August 2021 status update.

==== Imphal–Moreh-Kalay line ====
The Jiribam–Imphal line will be extended nearly 70 km to Moreh on the India–Myanmar border. Under the Look East policy of India, the line will be extended from Moreh to the existing railhead of Myanmar rail network at Kalay (also called Kale and Kalemyo) to form part of the ambitious Trans-Asian Railway. Indian plans to extend Imphal rail link to Moreh and eventually to the Myanmar railway system, allowing onward connectivity to Thailand and China. In 2007, plan for Imphal-Moreh was expressed by India. In January 2018, India initiated a preliminary survey to determine the feasibility of establishing a rail link parallel to the India–Myanmar–Thailand Trilateral Highway. Japan expressed interest in collaborating with India and funding the proposed rail link.

== In popular culture ==
The BAFTA-winning Manipuri film Boong was filmed in Moreh. It is the last recorded video of how Moreh originally looked before the ethnic clashes that began in 2023, destroyed the town. The shooting for 'Boong' in Moreh wrapped up barely a week before violence engulfed the township.

== See also ==
- Borders of India

== Bibliography ==
- Allen, B. C. (1905), Assam District Gazetteers: Naga Hills and Manipur, Calcutta, Baptist Misson Press – via archive.org
- Arambam, Lokendra (2018), "Land and ethnicity: A study of Manipur and its neighbourhood", in Bhagat Oinam; Dhiren A. Sadokpam (eds.), Northeast India: A Reader, Taylor & Francis, ISBN 9780429953200
- Dun, E. W. (1992) [1886], Gazetteer of Manipur, Manas Publications – via archive.org
- Grant Brown, G. E. R. (1913), Burmah Gazetteer: Upper Chindwin District, Volume A, Rangoon: Superintendent, Government Printing – via archive.org
- Banerjee, Himadri (2023), Beyond Punjab: Sikhs in East and Northeast India, Routledge, ISBN 978-1-032-35663-1
- Haokip, D. Michael (2007). "Kuki-Naga Conflict with Special Reference to the Chandel District of Manipur". In Lazar Jeyaseelan (ed.). Conflict Mapping and Peace Processes in North East India (PDF). North Eastern Social Research Centre. pp. 145–184. Archived from the original (PDF) on 18 December 2023.
- Haokip, Thongkholal (January 2023), "Territoriality, Conflict and Citizenship in the India–Myanmar Borderlands", The Journal of Indian and Asian Studies, 4 (1) 2350001, doi:10.1142/S2717541323500018
- Haokip, Seilienmang (2023), "Memory and kinship across the Indo–Myanmar border: A study of the lived experiences of displaced Kuki families", Memory Studies, 17 (6): 1–17, doi:10.1177/17506980231188484
- Harvey, G. E. (1925). History of Burma: From the Earliest Times to 10 March 1824. London: Frank Cass & Co. Ltd – via archive.org.
- Parratt, Saroj Nalini Arambam (2005). The Court Chronicle of the Kings of Manipur: The Cheitharon Kumpapa, Volume 1. London: Routledge. ISBN 9780415344302.
- Parratt, Saroj Nalini Arambam (2009). The Court Chronicle of the Kings of Manipur: The Cheitharon Kumpapa, Volume 2. Foundation Books / Cambridge University Press India. ISBN 978-81-7596-854-7.
- Parratt, Saroj Nalini Arambam (2013). The Court Chronicle of the Kings of Manipur: The Cheitharon Kumpapa, Volume 3. Foundation Books / Cambridge University Press India. ISBN 978-93-8226-498-9.
- Prasad, S. N.; Bhargava, K. D.; Khera, P. N. (1958), The Reconquest of Burma, Vol. 1, Official History of the Indian Armed Forces in the Second World War, 1939-45, Combined Inter-Services Historical Section (India & Pakistan)
- Tarapot, Phanjoubam (2003), Bleeding Manipur, Har-Anand Publications, ISBN 978-81-241-0902-1
- Tohring, S. R. (2010), Violence and Identity in North-east India: Naga-Kuki Conflict, Mittal Publications, ISBN 9788183243445
