= Hnahlan =

- Village
- Location in Mizoram, India Hnahlan (India)
- Coordinates: 23.6937905°N 93.3817264°E
- Country: India
- State: Mizoram
- District: Champhai
- Block: Champhai
- Elevation: 1,522 m (4,993 ft)

Population (2011)
  - Total: 3,157
- Time zone: UTC+5:30 (IST)
- 2011 census code: 271344

Hnahlan is a border town in the Champhai Rural Development Block of Champhai district of Mizoram state in India.

== Demographics ==
According to the 2011 census of India, Hnahlan has 569 households. The effective literacy rate (i.e. the literacy rate of population excluding children aged 6 and below) is 92.95%.

Demographics (2011 Census)
	Total	Male	Female
Population	3157	1602	1555
Children aged below 6 years	575	296	279
Scheduled caste	2	1	1
Scheduled tribe	3059	1525	1534
Literates	2400	1256	1144
Workers (all)	1735	877	858
Main workers (total)	1725	872	853
Main workers: Cultivators	1563	744	819
Main workers: Agricultural labourers	1	1	0
Main workers: Household industry workers	3	1	2
Main workers: Other	158	126	32
Marginal workers (total)	10	5	5
Marginal workers: Cultivators	6	3	3
Marginal workers: Agricultural labourers	0	0	0
Marginal workers: Household industry workers	0	0	0
Marginal workers: Others	4	2	2
Non-workers	1422	725	697

== Economy and border haat trade ==
Hnahlan is one of the 4 Border Haats (markets) in Mizoram, others being at Sangau, Vaphai (Saikhumphai) and Zote, all of which boost the local trade and economy.

== Transport and connectivity ==
Zokhawthar (75 km south) provides connectivity to India–Myanmar–Thailand Trilateral Highway (IMT), and Asian Highway Network and Asian Highway 1 (AH1).

== See also ==
- Borders of India
