= Pius Marwein =

Indian politician

Pius Marwein (born 1992) is an Indian politician from Meghalaya. He is a member of the Meghalaya Legislative Assembly from the Ranikor Assembly constituency as a member of the Bharatiya Janata Party which is reserved for Scheduled Tribe community, in South West Khasi Hills district. He was first elected in the 2023 Meghalaya Legislative Assembly election, representing the United Democratic Party.

== Early life and education ==
Marwein is from Nonghyllam Village, Balat post, South West Khasi Hills district, Meghalaya. He is the son of the late Klaspar Hahshah. He studied Class 12, and passed the examinations in 2020 for the Higher Secondary School leaving certificate in arts at 103 Chandrapur Senior Secondary School, Guwahati.

== Career ==
Marwein won the Ranikor Assembly constituency representing the United Democratic Party in the 2023 Meghalaya Legislative Assembly election. He polled 16,502 votes and defeated his nearest rival, Martin M. Danggo of the Bharatiya Janata Party, by a margin of 5,649 votes. He had previously lost the 2018 Meghalaya Legislative Assembly election, contesting on the United Democratic Party ticket, to Martin Danggo of the Congress Party. He was among the 8 UDP mlas who joined the Bharatiya Janata Party.
