= Tuipui =

Tuipui may refer to:

- Kaladan River, a river on India-Myanmar border
- Tuipui, Champhai, a village in Mizoram, India
