= HMK =

HMK may refer to:

- Hammock Music, an American record label
- Hindu Makkal Katchi, a political party in Tamil Nadu, India
- Hindumalkote railway station, in Pakistan
- Hanumankind, an Indian rapper
- Ye-Maek language, an unclassified language of Manchuria and Korea
