= Hindumalkote =

Village in Rajasthan, India

- Village
- Hindumalkote Border
- Location within Rajasthan Location within India
- Coordinates: 30.13637°N 73.91685°E
- Country: India
- State: Rajasthan
- District: Sri Ganganagar
- Named after: Diwan of Bikaner

Government
  - Sarpanch: Gurpal Singh Butter

Languages
  - Official: Hindi
  - Most Spoken: Punjabi
- Time zone: UTC+5:30 (IST)

The Hindumalkote is a border village situated 26 km from Sri Ganganagar city in Sri Ganganagar district in the Indian state of Rajasthan. It serves as a demarcation point between the countries of India and Pakistan.

Named in honor of Hindumal, the Diwan of Bikaner, this border has become one of the primary tourist attractions in the region. It is located approximately 26 kilometers from the city of Sri Ganganagar.

The Hindumalkote Border is open to the public every day from 10:00 AM to 5:30 PM. Visitors can witness various ceremonies and events that take place at the border, making it a significant cultural and patriotic experience.

== Location ==
Hindumalkot is located on the international border between India and Pakistan, in Sri Ganganagar district of India. It is adjacent to the Punjab border. It is located at a distance of 26 kilometers (16 miles) both from the town of Abohar and Sri Ganganagar.

== History ==
Hindu Malkot was earlier known as Odaki. Its distance from the present Odaki village is about eight kilometers. The demarcation was done by Bikaner state in 1914. At that time, the Diwan of the state, Hindumal, had also come to this area along with the demarcation workers. While staying here, he fell ill and passed away. Maharaj Ganga Singh changed the name of this market from Odaki to Hindumalkot in the memory of his Diwan.

Before partition, Hindumalkot was an important trading market of Bikaner state. Its trade relations extended from Bahawalpur, Lahore, Karachi, Peshawar and Queeta to Afghanistan, Kabul and Kenya. During the reign of Bikaner state, this mandi had the status of a Nagarpanika tailor and this mandi had created its own special identity in the gram trade. but

In 1959, the traders got a big blow when this market was given the status of Panchayat from Municipality. 03. During the British rule, three railway routes were built to connect Bombay and Delhi with Karachi, one of which was from Delhi via Bahawalpur via Bathinda, Hindumalkot. The Hindumankot-Bahawalpur railway route was closed a few days after partition.

The Government of Pakistan uprooted the railway tracks in its territory and leveled the tracks. Whereas the Delhi-Bathinda train continued to run at Hindumalkot railway station till 1969. But in 1970, for security reasons, the railway station was shifted three kilometers away. The building of the old railway station is still reminiscent of the bygone days

== Tourist attractions ==
The Hindumalkot Border is known for its India-Pakistan Border daily flag-lowering ceremony. This is an opportunity for tourists to witness the border guards from both India and Pakistan participating in a coordinated and synchronized display of patriotism.

== Transport ==
Hindumalkot is well connected with road and is linked directly to Sri Ganganagar, Fazilka, Abohar, Bathinda, and many other cities. National Highway 62 passes through Sri Ganganagar. Hindumalkote railway station is a main railway station in Sri Ganganagar District. The Village is directly connected to Sri Ganganagar, Abohar, Fazilka, Bikaner, Ambala, and some other cities via train.

== See also ==
- Sri Ganganagar
- India-Pakistan Border
- Bhalgaon
