= Vaphai =

Vaphai Ivaphai
- village
- Nickname: Phaikhawpui
- Location in Mizoram, India Vaphai (India)
- Coordinates: 23.146832°N 93.325227°E
- Country: India
- State: Mizoram
- District: Champhai
- Block: Khawbung
- Founder: Mitinliana
- Elevation: 1,733 m (5,686 ft)

Population (2011)
  - Total: 2,252

Languages
  - Official: Mizo
- Time zone: UTC+5:30 (IST)
- PIN: 796321
- Vehicle registration: MZ
- Coastline: 0 kilometres (0 mi)
- Nearest city: Champhai
- Sex ratio: 968 females per 1000 males ♂/♀
- Literacy: 98.06%
- Website: thlangtlakmual.com

Vaphai is a village at the extreme east of Champhai district of Mizoram.

== Geography and location ==
Vaphai, with an average altitude of 5,686 feet (1,733 m) above sea level, lies about 11 km east of Tehsil Main Town Khawbung.

== Etymology ==
Its original name was "Ivaphai", which literally means "Plains of the river Iva", referring to its original location in the river valley slightly west of its present location. The first syllable got dropped probably by elision in course of time. It is situated at an average altitude of 5,686 feet (1,733 m) above sea level.

== History ==
The village was established by Pu Mitinlianan in 1876 who started ruling the village for 45 years till his death in 1921. It was then ruled by Pu Chawnghleithanga in 1922 (1 year), who then passed it on to his son Pu Thatinchhuma who ruled till 1937 (14 years). And who then passed it on to his wife Pi Satinkhawli ruled till 1944. The last chieftainship was held by Pu Lalrokhama (10 years) until the abolition of chieftainship in 1954.

== Demographics ==
According to the 2011 census of India, Vaphai has 454 households. The effective literacy rate (i.e. the literacy rate of population excluding children aged 6 and below) is 95.25%.

Demographics (2011 Census)
| | Total | Male | Female |
|---|---|---|---|
| Population | 2252 | 1144 | 1108 |
| Children aged below 6 years | 419 | 198 | 221 |
| Scheduled caste | 0 | 0 | 0 |
| Scheduled tribe | 2203 | 1109 | 1094 |
| Literates | 1746 | 911 | 835 |
| Workers (all) | 1123 | 621 | 502 |
| Main workers (total) | 1108 | 618 | 490 |
| Main workers: Cultivators | 821 | 431 | 390 |
| Main workers: Agricultural labourers | 109 | 58 | 51 |
| Main workers: Household industry workers | 9 | 7 | 2 |
| Main workers: Other | 169 | 122 | 47 |
| Marginal workers (total) | 15 | 3 | 12 |
| Marginal workers: Cultivators | 5 | 1 | 4 |
| Marginal workers: Agricultural labourers | 3 | 1 | 2 |
| Marginal workers: Household industry workers | 0 | 0 | 0 |
| Marginal workers: Others | 7 | 1 | 6 |
| Non-workers | 1129 | 523 | 606 |

== Tourism ==
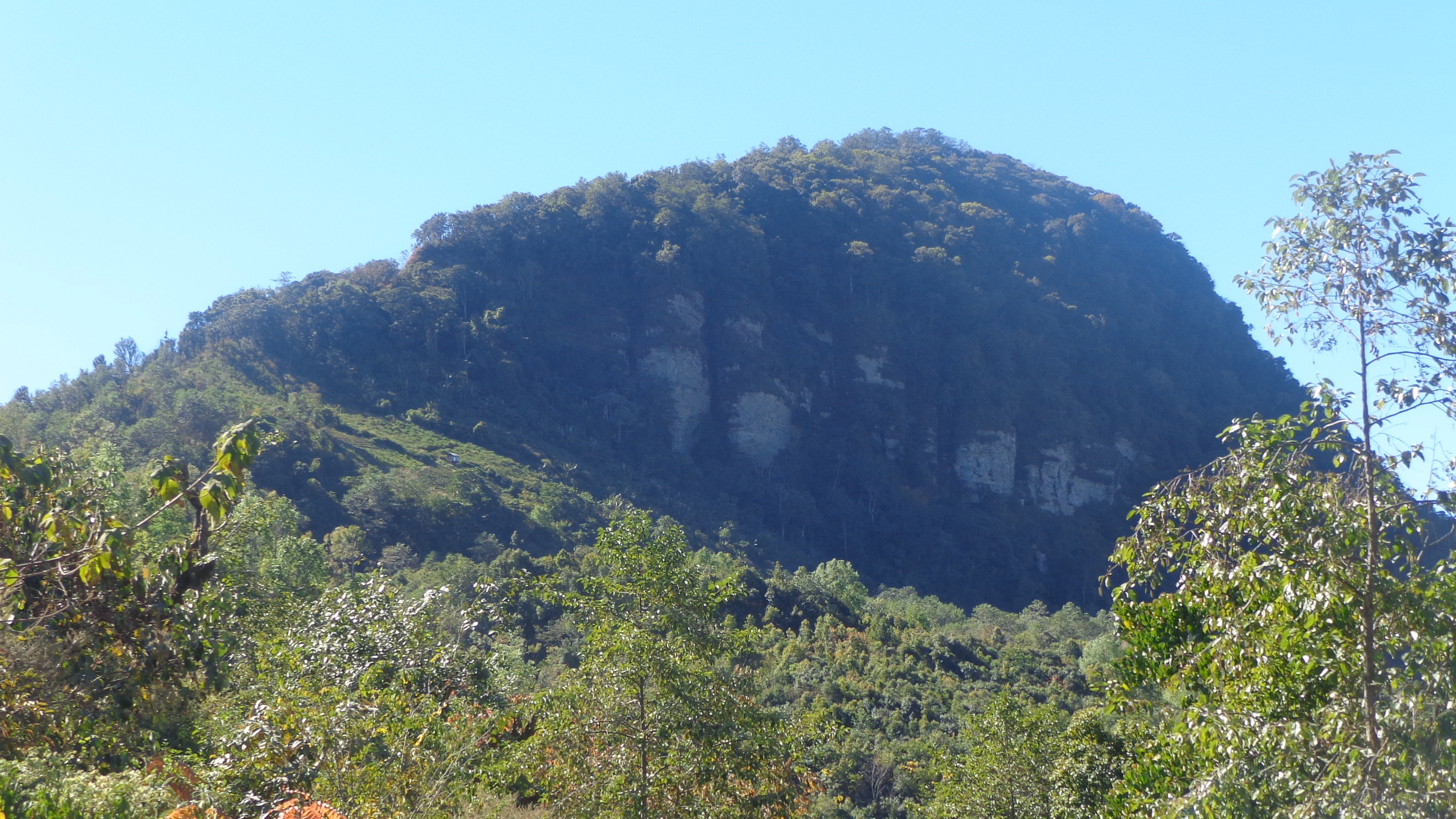
Țan Tlang mountain

Since the Mizos moved into Mizoram from the east, most historical monuments and places of cultural importance are to be found in eastern Mizoram and Burma.

Ṭan tláng, lit. Ṭan mountain, with a height of 6,027 feet (1,837 m) is the fifth-tallest mountain in Mizoram.

== Economy and border haat trade ==
Vaphai (Saikhumphai) is one of the 4 Border Haats (markets) in Mizoram, others being at Sangau (Pangkhua), Hnahlan and Zote, all of which boost the local trade and economy.

== Transport and connectivity ==
Zokhawthar (88 km north) provides connectivity to India–Myanmar–Thailand Trilateral Highway (IMT), and Asian Highway Network and Asian Highway 1 (AH1).

== See also ==
- Borders of India
