= Borders of India =

Political boundaries between India and neighboring territories

India and its borders.

The Republic of India shares international borders with several sovereign states. It shares land borders with Bangladesh, Bhutan, China, Myanmar, Nepal, and Pakistan. Bangladesh, Myanmar, and Pakistan share both land borders as well as maritime borders, while Sri Lanka shares only a maritime border through Ram Setu. India's Andaman and Nicobar Islands share a maritime border with Thailand, Myanmar and Indonesia.

== Borders ==
=== Land borders ===
==== Barriers ====
India has constructed fences along the following borders:

- India–Bangladesh border barrier
- India–Myanmar border barrier
- India–Pakistan border barrier

==== Borders ====
India shares land borders with six sovereign nations. The state's Ministry of Home Affairs also recognizes a 106 kilometres (66 mi) land border with a seventh nation, Afghanistan, as part of its claim on the Kashmir region; however, this is disputed and the region bordering Afghanistan has been administered by Pakistan as part of Gilgit–Baltistan since 1947 (see Durand Line).

Land Border Country	Dispute	Length (Km) and (mi)	Force	Comments
Bangladesh	N	4,096 kilometres (2,545 mi)	Border Security Force	Most of the India–Bangladesh enclaves exchanged in 2015. See Bangladesh Liberation War and Bangladesh–India relations.
Bhutan	N	578 kilometres (359 mi)	Sashastra Seema Bal	Open border. See Bhutan–India relations.
China	Y	3,488 kilometres (2,167 mi)	Indo-Tibetan Border Police and Special Frontier Force	Also see Ardagh–Johnson Line, Macartney–MacDonald Line, McMahon Line, Sino-Indian border dispute and China–India relations.
Myanmar	N	1,643 kilometres (1,021 mi)	Assam Rifles and Indian Army	See India-Myanmar relations.
Nepal	Y	1,752 kilometres (1,089 mi)	Sashastra Seema Bal	Open border. See Kalapani territory, Susta territory and India-Nepal relations.
Pakistan	Y	3,320 kilometres (2,060 mi)	Border Security Force	Also see Radcliffe Line, Line of Control, Actual Ground Position Line and Sir Creek. See Partition of India, Indo-Pakistani wars and conflicts, Transport between India and Pakistan and India-Pakistan relations.
Afghanistan	Y	106 kilometres (66 mi)	Border Security Force	Part I of the Constitution of India defines India as having a land border with 7 countries, including with Afghanistan. India claims a border between the Wakhan Corridor of Afghanistan and Gilgit-Baltistan in Pakistan-administered Kashmir as part of their claim to sovereignty of the whole Kashmir region. See Afghanistan–Pakistan border dispute, India-Afghanistan land border and Durand Line.

==== Border ceremonies ====
India co-hosts the joint ceremonies with the neighbouring nations at the following border crossings. The most attended and emotionally charged among these is the one at Wagha-Attari Border near Amritsar-Lahore.

Border	Ceremony Locations	Notes
India-Pakistan border (listed north to south)	Attari–Wagah border ceremony near Amritsar in Punjab.	Joint daily India-Pak ceremony, most attended and emotionally charged ceremony.
India-Pakistan border (listed north to south)	Ganda Singh Wala–Hussainiwala border ceremony near Firozepur in Punjab.	Joint daily India-Pak ceremony with cafes. Indian side has tourist facilities, shops, Hussainiwala National Martyrs Memorial and museum of Bhagat Singh, Sukhdev Thapar and Shivaram Rajguru at the site of their cremation by British raj.
India-Pakistan border (listed north to south)	Sadqi-Sulemanki border ceremony near Fazilka in Punjab.	Joint daily India-Pak ceremony with cafe on Indian side.
India-Pakistan border (listed north to south)	Hindumalkote in Sri Ganganagar district of Rajasthan	One-sided daily display by India's BSF with cafe, reachable by road or rail 18 km from Sri Ganganagar to Hindumalkote railway station though historic India-Pakistan railway link is now defunct.
India-Pakistan border (listed north to south)	Khajuwala Satpal Border Outpost (BOP) in Bikaner district of Rajasthan	One-sided daily display by India's BSF with a Beating Retreat ceremony, tourist gallery, and cafe.
India-Pakistan border (listed north to south)	Sanchu Post in Bikaner district of Rajasthan	One-sided occasional display by India's BSF with cafe and museum on Indian side surrounded by tall sand dunes, 38 km west of Ranjeetpura and 175 km west of Bikaner.
India-Pakistan border (listed north to south)	Tanot/Longewala in Jaisalmer district in Rajasthan	One-sided occasional display by India's BSF with cafe and War Museum on Indian side which also shows the famous open-air battlefield with captured 1971 Pakistani tanks.
India-Pakistan border (listed north to south)	Khokhrapar–Munabao border ceremony in Barmer district of Rajasthan.	Joint daily India-Pak ceremony.
India-Pakistan border (listed north to south)	Nadabet of Vav-Tharad district in Gujarat	One-Sided Tue-Sun (closed Monday) display by India's BSF with a major tourist complex on India side which also has museum and cafe.
India-China border (listed west to east)	Daulat Beg Oldi	Border Personnel Meeting Point (BPM Point)
India-China border (listed west to east)	Spanggur Gap (Chushul)	Border Personnel Meeting point, tourists on Indian side need Inner Line Permit (ILP).
India-China border (listed west to east)	Nathu La	Used for pilgrims to monasteries in Sikkim; reduces journey time to Lake Manasarovar. Tourists to Nathu La on Indian side need ILP.
India-China border (listed west to east)	Bum La Pass (Tawang)	Open on Sundays and during cultural ceremonies, tourists La on Indian side need ILP.
India-China border (listed west to east)	Kaho (north of Kibithu in Walong sector)	Border Personnel Meeting point, tourists on Indian side need ILP.
India-Bangladesh border (listed clockwise from southwest)	Benapole–Petrapole border ceremony in North 24 Parganas district of West Bengal	Joint daily ceremony by BSF (Border Security Force) and BGB (Border Guards Bangladesh). 60-70 km northeast of Barasat and Kolkata.
India-Bangladesh border (listed clockwise from southwest)	Phulbari-Banglabandha in Darjeeling district of West Bengal	Joint daily ceremony 11 km south of Siliguri.
India-Bangladesh border (listed clockwise from southwest)	Changrabandha-Burimari in Cooch Behar district of West Bengal	Joint daily ceremony, 80 km southeast of SIlliguri and 70 km east of Cooch Bihar.
India-Bangladesh border (listed clockwise from southwest)	Agartala-Akhaura in Tripura	Joint daily ceremony, its the second-largest site on India-Bangladesh border 4km west of Agartala city.

=== Maritime borders and EEZs ===
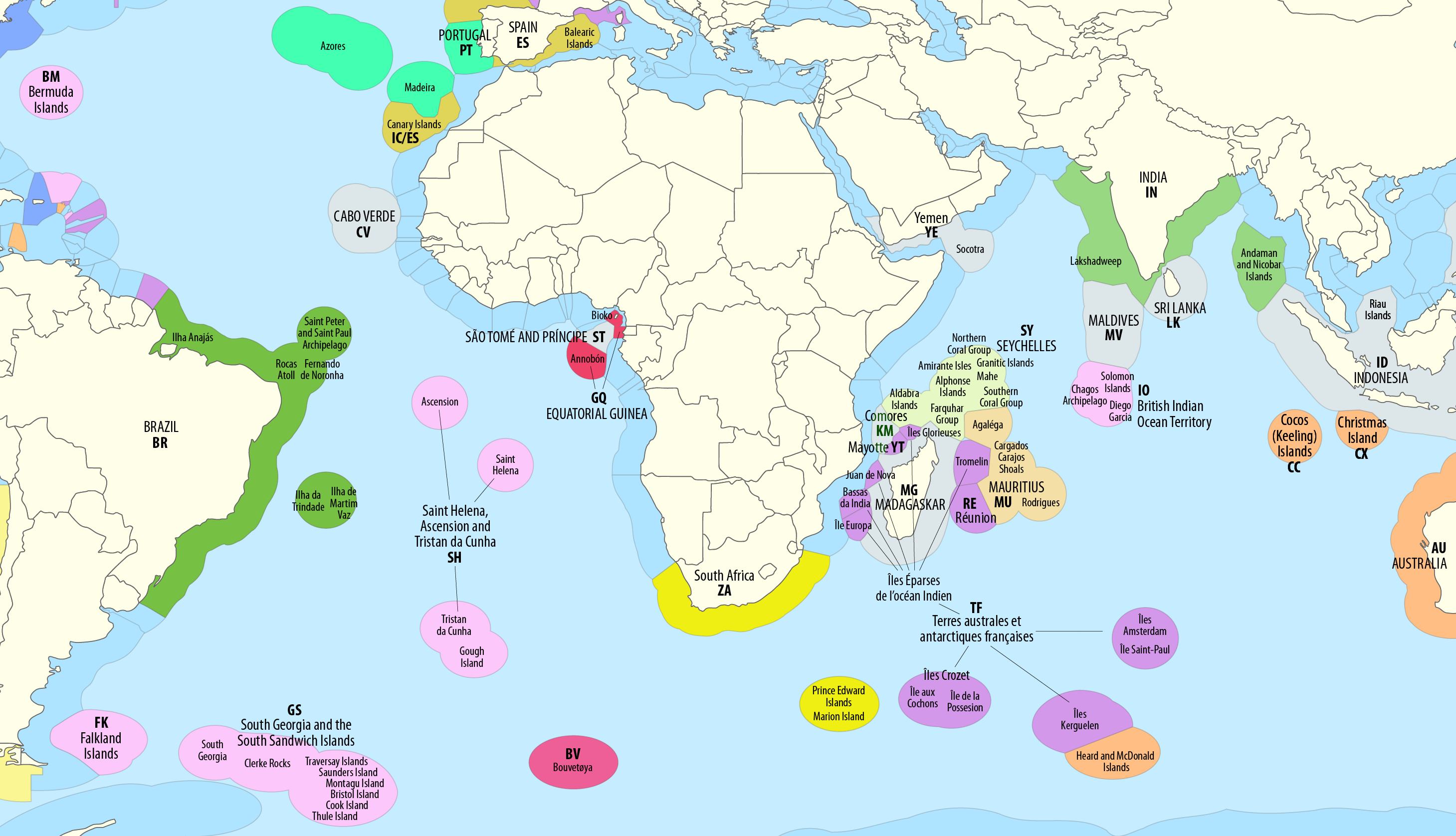
EEZs in the Atlantic and Indian Oceans

Maritime borders of India are the maritime boundary recognized by the United Nations Convention on the Law of the Sea entails boundaries of territorial waters, contiguous zones, and exclusive economic zones. India, with its claim of a 12-nautical-mile (22 km; 14 mi) territorial maritime zone and 200-nautical-mile (370 km; 230 mi) exclusive economic zone, has a more than 7,000-kilometre (4,300 mi) maritime border shared with seven nations.

Maritime Border Country	Length (km) and (mi)	Force	Comments
Bangladesh		Indian Navy	New Moore Island in Bay of Bengal
Indonesia	555 kilometres (345 mi)	Indian Navy	Indira Point in Andaman Sea
Myanmar		Indian Navy	Landfall Island in Andaman Sea
Pakistan		Indian Navy	Sir Creek in Arabian Sea
Thailand		Indian Navy	Similan Islands in Andaman Sea
Sri Lanka	>400 kilometres (250 mi)	Indian Navy	Katchatheevu in Palk Strait
Maldives	1,009 kilometres (627 mi)	Indian Navy	Maliku Kandu in Laccadive Sea

== Designated border crossings ==
=== Integrated Check Posts (ICP) ===
India has 7 functional ICPs, and plans are underway to upgrade 13 more LCS to ICP, including 7 at borders taking total of border ICP to 14, at the cost of ₹3,005 crore (US$320 million)(56 Australian Dollars as of May 2025)(c. June 2024 ). Designated Integrated Check Posts (ICP), with both customs and immigration facilities are:

Border	State	Check Post	Status	Notes	References
India–Bangladesh	Assam	Sutarkandi	Planned	Connects to Golapganj uppozilla in Sylhet District	
India–Bangladesh	Meghalaya	Dawki ICP	Operational since 2018	Connects to Tambil post (Bangladesh)	
India–Bangladesh	Mizoram	Kawrpuichhuah (near Tlabung)	Operational since Oct 2017	On Khawthalangtuipui river (Karnaphuli)	
India–Bangladesh	Tripura	Agartala–Akhaura	Operational (c. 2017)	Connects to Dhaka	
India–Bangladesh	Tripura	Belonia–Parshuram		Road and rail crossing	
India–Bangladesh	West Bengal	Petrapole	Operational (c. 2017)	Connects Kolkata to Dhaka	
India–Bangladesh	West Bengal	Ghojadanga	Planned		
India–Bangladesh	West Bengal	Mahadipur	In-principle approval (2019)	Connects to Rajshahi	
India–Bangladesh	West Bengal	Fulbari	Planned		
India–Bangladesh	West Bengal	Hili	Planned		
India–Bhutan	West Bengal	Jaigaon	Plan approved (c. 2016)	In Alipurduar district	
India–Myanmar	Manipur	Moreh ICP	Operational		
India–Myanmar	Mizoram	Zochawchhuah–Zorinpui	Operational since Oct 2017	On Kaladan Multi-Modal Transit Transport Project	
India–Nepal	Uttarakhand	Banbasa	In-principle approval (2019)	In Champawat district	
India–Nepal	Bihar	Bhitthamore	In-principle approval (2019)	In Sitamarhi district	
India–Nepal	Bihar	Jogbani			
India–Nepal	West Bengal	Panitanki	In-principle approval (2019)	In Darjeeling district	
India–Nepal	Bihar	ICP Raxaul			
India–Nepal	Uttar Pradesh	Sonauli			
India–Nepal	Uttar Pradesh	Rupaidiha			
India–Nepal	Uttar Pradesh	Taulihawa-Siddharthnagar			
India–Pakistan	Punjab	Attari	Operational (2017)	At Wagah (see Samjhauta Express)	
India–Pakistan	Punjab	Kartarpur Corridor		Visa-free access to Gurdwara Darbar Sahib	
India–Pakistan	Rajasthan	Munabao		(see Thar Express)	

=== Land Customs Stations (LCS) ===
Border	State	Land Customs Station	Connecting To (Bangladesh)	Status	Notes	References
India–Bangladesh	Assam	Mankachar	Rowmari post (Natun Bandar, Rangpur division)	Functional		
India–Bangladesh	Assam	Karimganj Steamer and Ferry Station (KSFS)	Zakiganj post (Sylhet division)	Functional		
India–Bangladesh	Assam	Guwahati Steamer Ghat (Dhubri district)		Functional		
India–Bangladesh	Assam	Dhubri Steamer Ghat	Rowmati (Maymansingh division)	Functional		
India–Bangladesh	Assam	Mahisasan railway station	Shahbazpur (Sylhet division)	Non-functional		
India–Bangladesh	Assam	Golokganj	Sonahaat (Rangpur Division)	Non-functional		
India–Bangladesh	Assam	Silchar Railway Mail Service		Non-functional	Inland LCS (no border crossing)	
India–Bangladesh	Meghalaya	Baghmara (South Garo Hills)	Bijoyour post	Functional		
India–Bangladesh	Meghalaya	Bholaganj	Chatak (Sunamganj division)	Functional		
India–Bangladesh	Meghalaya	Borsara (West Khasi Hills)	Borsara post	Functional		
India–Bangladesh	Meghalaya	Mahendraganj	Bakshiganj	Functional	On NH12	
India–Bangladesh	Meghalaya	Dalu	Nakugaon post	Functional	On NH217	
India–Bangladesh	Meghalaya	Shellabazar	Sunamganj (Sylhet division)	Functional		
India–Bangladesh	Meghalaya	Gasuapara	Karoitol (Mymansing division)	Functional		
India–Bangladesh	Meghalaya	Ryngku (East Khasi Hills)	Kalibari (Sonamganj division)	Non-functional		
India–Bangladesh	Meghalaya	Balat (East Khasi Hills)	Dolura (Sylhet division)	Non-functional		
India–Bangladesh	Tripura	Srimantapur	Bibir Bazar (Comilla division)	Operational	Became operational January 2016	
India–Bangladesh	Tripura	Dhalaighat	Kumarghat (Sunamganj division)	Functional		
India–Bangladesh	Tripura	Khowaighat	Balla (Habiganj division)	Functional		
India–Bangladesh	Tripura	Manu	Chatlapur (Sylhet division)	Functional		
India–Bangladesh	Tripura	Muhurighat	Belonia (Feni division)	Functional		
India–Bangladesh	Tripura	Old Ragnabazar	Betul (Fultali) (Sylhet division)	Functional		
India–Bangladesh	Mizoram	Kawarpuchiah		Operational	Opened October 2017 by PM Modi	
India–Bangladesh	Mizoram	Demagiri	Rangamati (Sylhet division)	Non-functional		
India–Pakistan	Rajasthan	Longewala			In Jaisalmer district	

== Border markets ==
This is incomplete list of designated border markets, also called bazaars and haats, established by the efforts of Ministry of External Affairs.

=== India–Bangladesh ===
India–Bangladesh Border Haats
State	District	Location	Reference
Meghalaya	East Khasi Hills district	Balat	
Meghalaya	East Khasi Hills district	Bholaganj	
Meghalaya	South West Garo Hills district	Kalaichar	
Meghalaya	South West Garo Hills district	Ryngku	
Meghalaya	West Garo Hills district	Nalikata	
Meghalaya	West Garo Hills district	Shibbari	
Mizoram	Mamit district	Mapara - Longkor	
Mizoram	Mamit district	Tuipuibari - Not provided	
Mizoram	Lunglei district	Silsury - Mahmuam	
Mizoram	Lunglei district	Nunsuri - Not provided	
Tripura	West Tripura district	Kamalasagar	
Tripura	West Tripura district	Boxanagar	
Tripura	West Tripura district	Bamutia	
Tripura	South Tripura district	Srinagar, Tripura	
Tripura	South Tripura district	Ekimpur	
Tripura	North Tripura district	Pal Basti (Raghna)	
Tripura	North Tripura district	Hiracherra (Kailasahar)	
Tripura	North Tripura district	Kamalpur, Tripura (Dhalai)	

=== India–Bhutan ===
India-Bhutan Border Haat on India-Bhutan border are in operation, such as the Gelephu-Hatisar border market road entry point, Phuntsholing to its west and Samdrup Jongkhar to its east are two other border market road entry points into Bhutan.

=== India–Myanmar ===
India–Myanmar border Haats are.

India–Myanmar Border Haats
State	District	Indian Location	Myanmar Location	Reference
Arunachal Pradesh	Changlang district	Pangsau Pass (Nampong)	Pangsau, Kachin State	
Arunachal Pradesh	Changlang district	Chingsa (Khimiyang Circle)	Langhong, Kachin State	
Arunachal Pradesh	Changlang district	Makantong (Khimiyang Circle)	Ngaimong, Kachin State	
Arunachal Pradesh	Tirap district	Wakka/Pongchao/Lazu	Tirap, Kachin State	
Manipur	Ukhrul district	Kongkan Thana	Aungci (suggested by State Government)	
Manipur	Chandel district	New Somtal	Thenjen, or Khampat	
Manipur	Churachandpur district	Behiang	Khenman, or Chikha	
Mizoram	Lawngtlai district	Hruitezawl	Varang	
Mizoram	Champhai district	Hnahlan	Darkhai	
Mizoram	Champhai district	Vaphai	Leilet	
Mizoram	Siaha district	Chakhang	Nviaphia	
Nagaland	Tuensang district	Avakhung	Layshi (32 km apart)	
Nagaland	Tuensang district	Pangsha	Lahe/Hkamti District HQ (60 km apart)	
Nagaland	Mon district	Chemoho/Longwa	Lahe (60 km apart)	
Nagaland	Phek district	Molhe	Pansat (10 km apart)	

== In popular media ==
Pradeep Damodaran's book Borderlands: Travels Across India's Boundaries chronicles all land borders of India. The Bollywood director J. P. Dutta has specialised in making Hindi movies with India's border as a key element of the theme, his movies are Border, Refugee, LOC: Kargil, Paltan, etc.

== Gallery ==
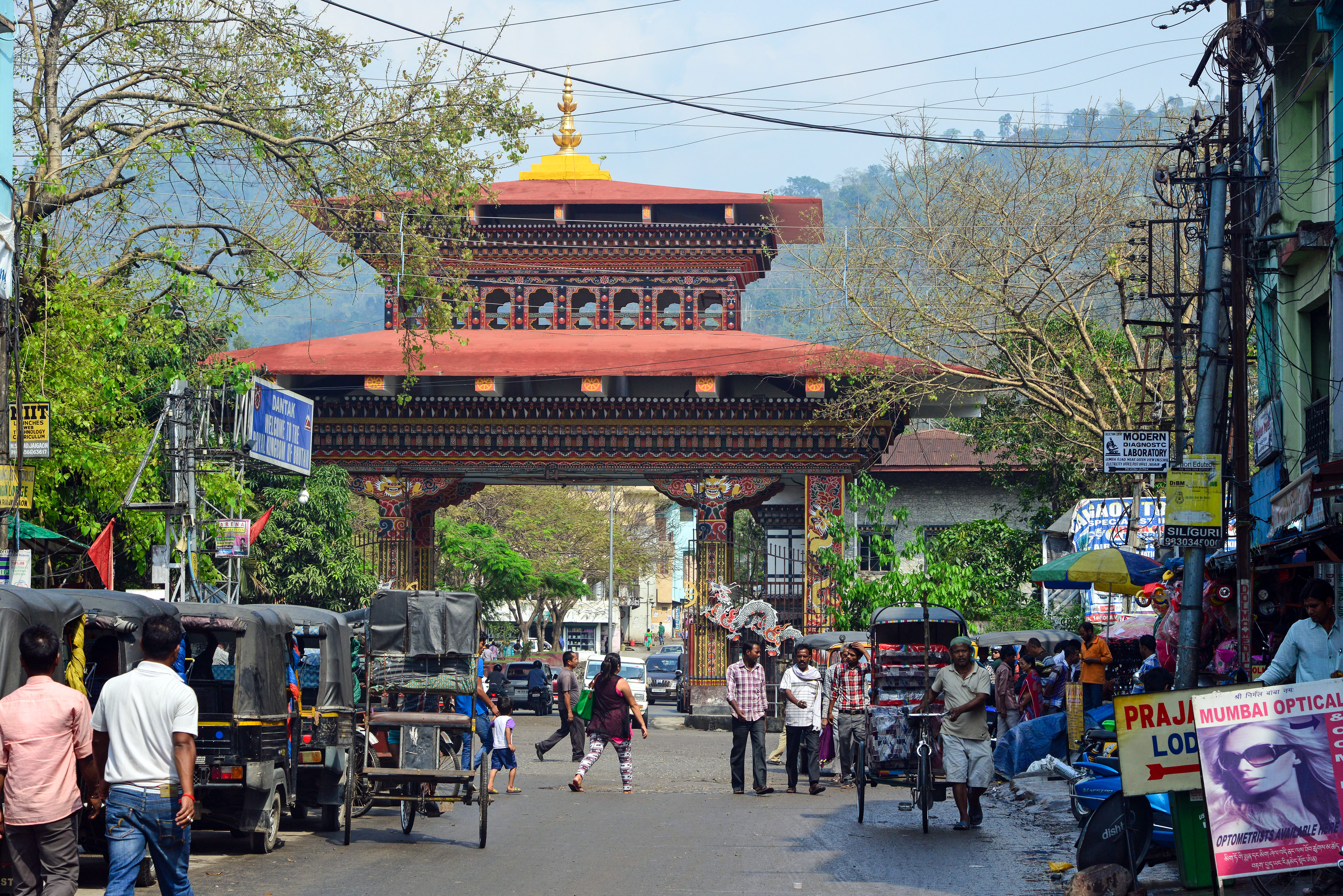
Bhutan Gate between Jaigaon and Phuntsholing.

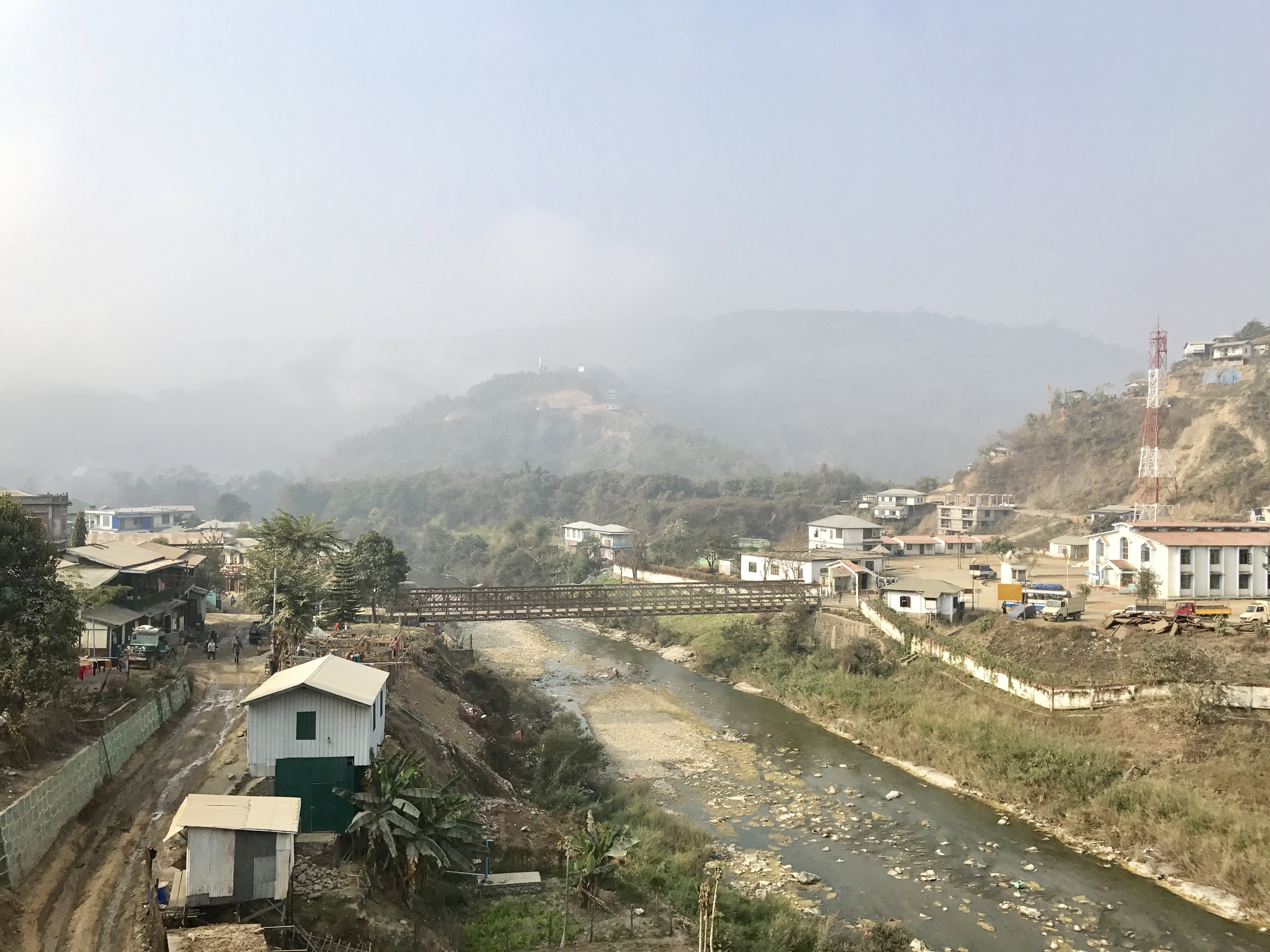
India-Myanmar Rikhawdar-Zokhawthar border crossing across the Tyao River.

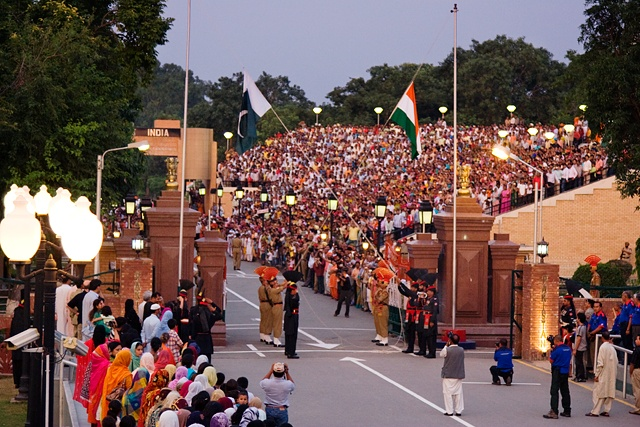
India-Pakistan Border ceremony at Attari–Wagah border.

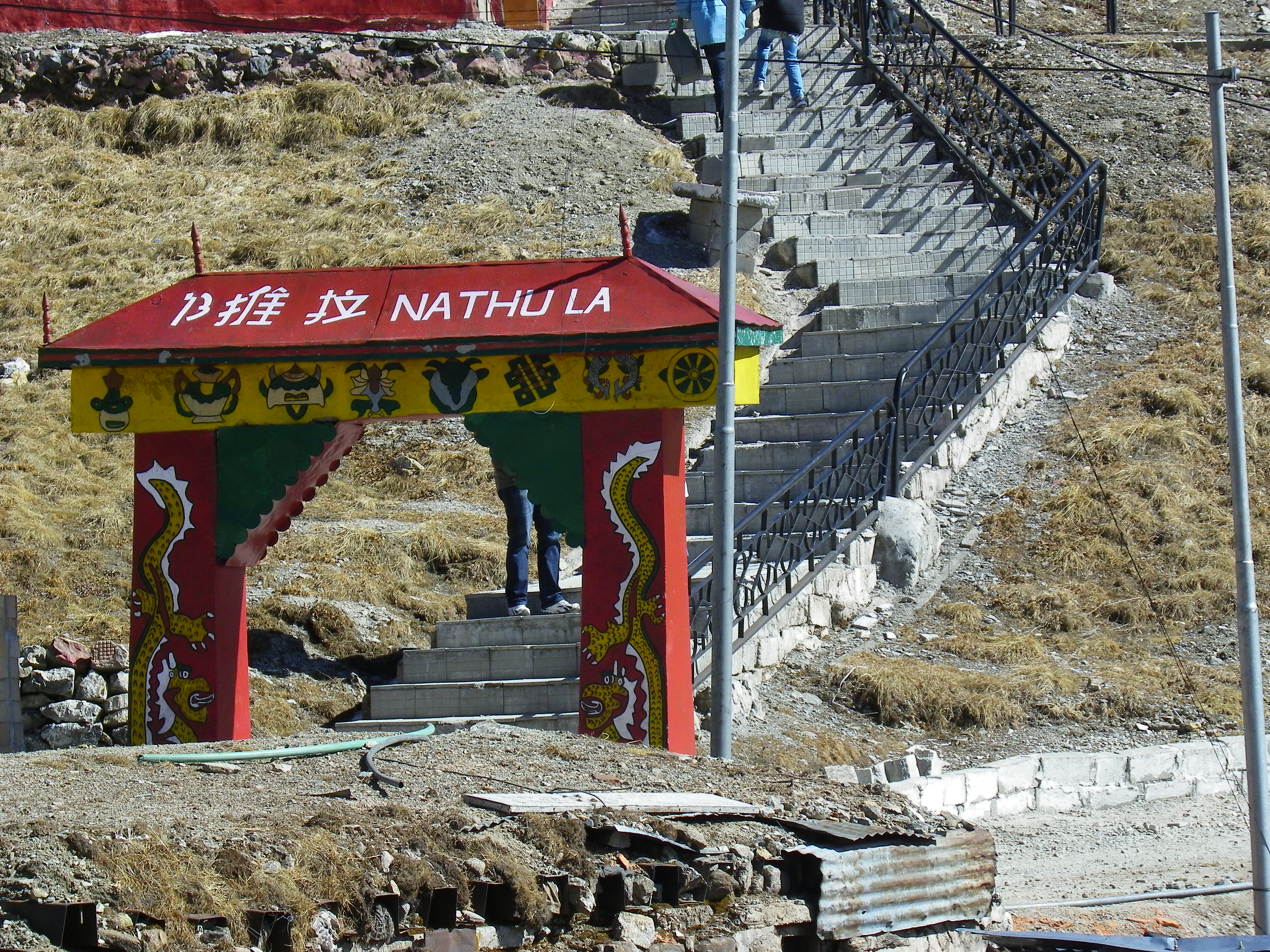
India-Tibet Nathu La border in Sikkim.

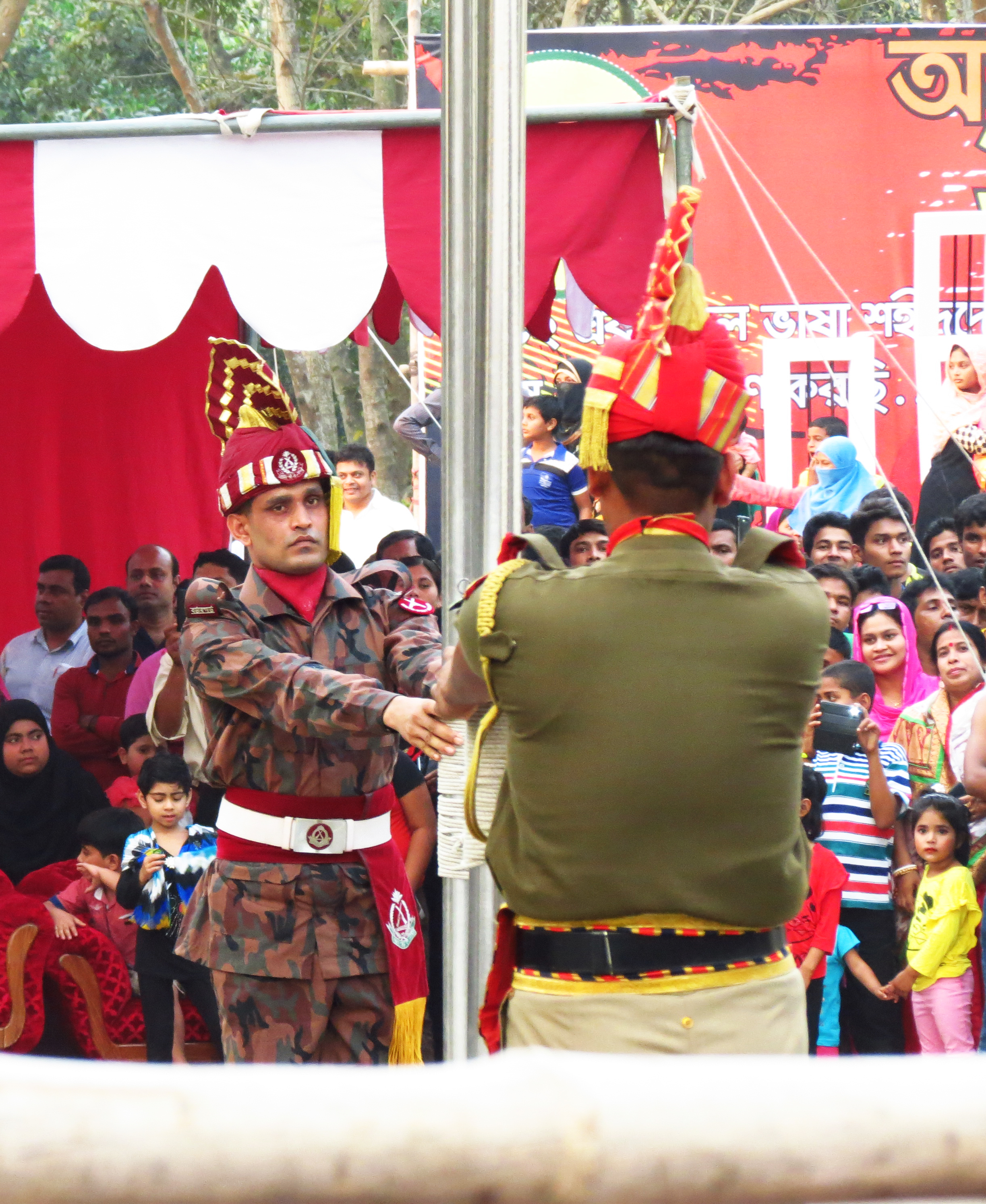
Indian and Bangladeshi soldiers at Benapole–Petrapole border ceremony.

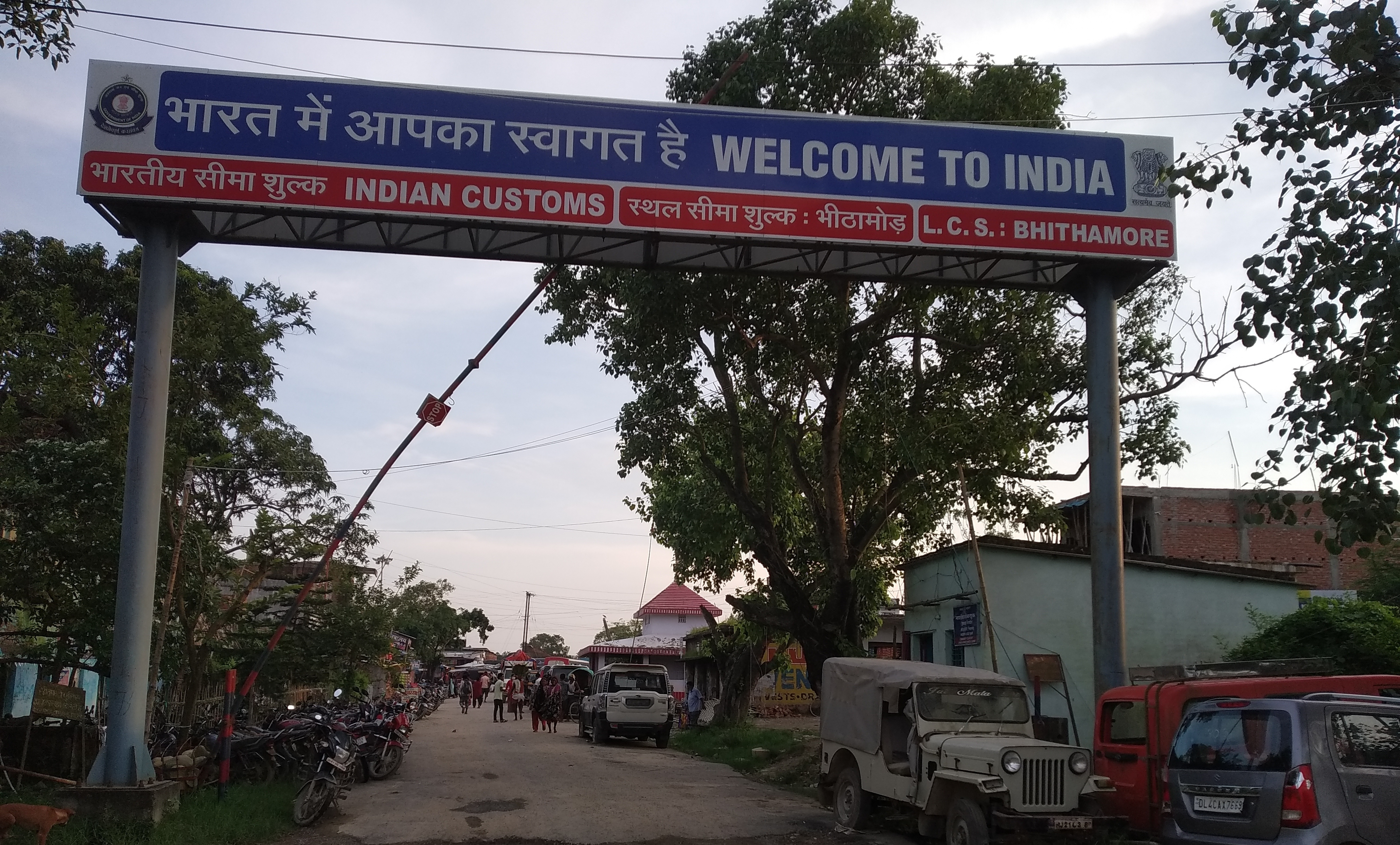
India-Nepal border - signage board at Bhitthamore gateway.

== See also ==
India related

- Climate of India
- Geography of India
  - Disputed territories of India
  - Exclusive economic zone of India
  - Extreme points of India
  - How different scales of measurement impacts the length of land border
- Development
  - Look East policy
  - Northeast India connectivity projects

Lists

- List of countries and territories by land borders
- List of countries and territories by land and maritime borders
- List of countries and territories by maritime boundaries
- List of countries that border only one other country
- List of land borders by date of establishment
- List of divided islands
- List of island nations
- List of political and geographic borders
