= Act East policy =

India's foreign policy dealing with South-East Asian nations

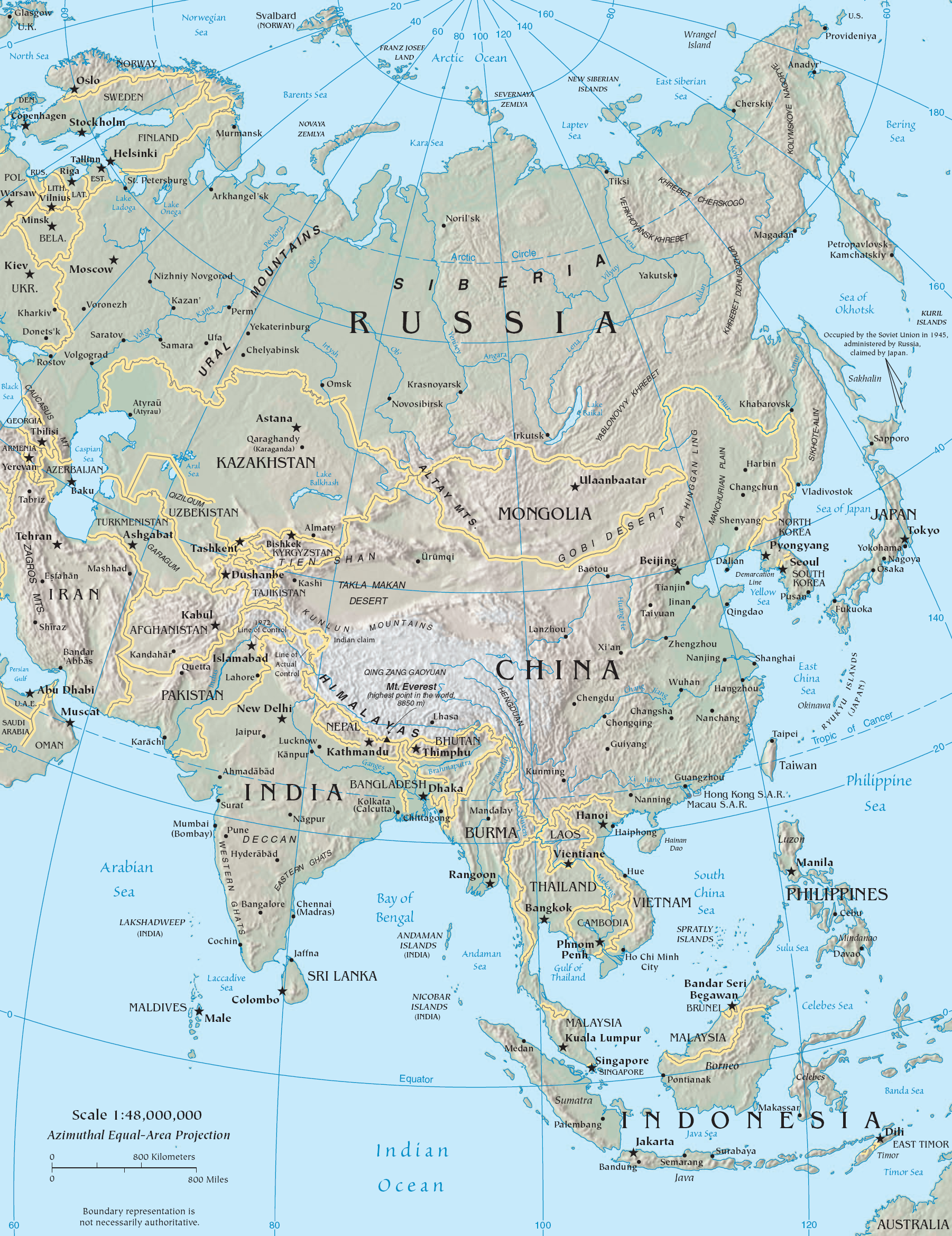
India, China, and the Southeast Asian countries

The Act East policy is an effort by the Government of India to cultivate extensive economic and strategic relations with the nations of Southeast Asia to bolster its standing as a regional power and a counterweight to the strategic influence of the People's Republic of China.

Initiated in 1991 as the Look East policy during the government of Prime Minister Narsimha Rao (1991–1996), it marked a strategic shift in India’s perspective of the world. It was rigorously pursued by the successive administrations of Atal Bihari Vajpayee (1998–2004) and Manmohan Singh (2004–2014).

In 2014, the Prime Minister Narendra Modi's administration announced the action-oriented, project- and outcome-based Act East Policy as a successor to the Look East Policy, emphasizing a more proactive role for India.

== Background ==
Ever since the Sino-Indian War of 1962, China and India have been strategic competitors in South and East Asia. China has cultivated close commercial and military relations with India's neighbour Pakistan and competed for influence in Nepal and Bangladesh. After Deng Xiaoping's rise to power in China in 1979 and the subsequent reform and opening up, China began reducing threats of expansionism and in turn cultivated extensive trade and economic relations with Asian nations. China became the closest partner and supporter of the military junta of Burma, which had been ostracised from the international community following the violent suppression of pro-democracy activities in 1988. In contrast, during the Cold War, India had a relatively hesitant relationship with many states in Southeast Asia as such diplomatic relations were given relatively low priority.

India's "Look East" policy was developed and enacted during the governments of prime ministers P.V. Narasimha Rao (1991–1996) and Atal Bihari Vajpayee (1998–2004). Along with economic liberalisation and moving away from Cold War-era policies and activities, India's strategy has focused on forging close economic and commercial ties, increasing strategic and security cooperation and the emphasis of historic cultural and ideological links. India sought to create and expand regional markets for trade, investments and industrial development. It also began strategic and military cooperation with nations concerned by the expansion of China's economic and strategic influence.

== Actions ==
=== Relations with East and Southeast Asia ===
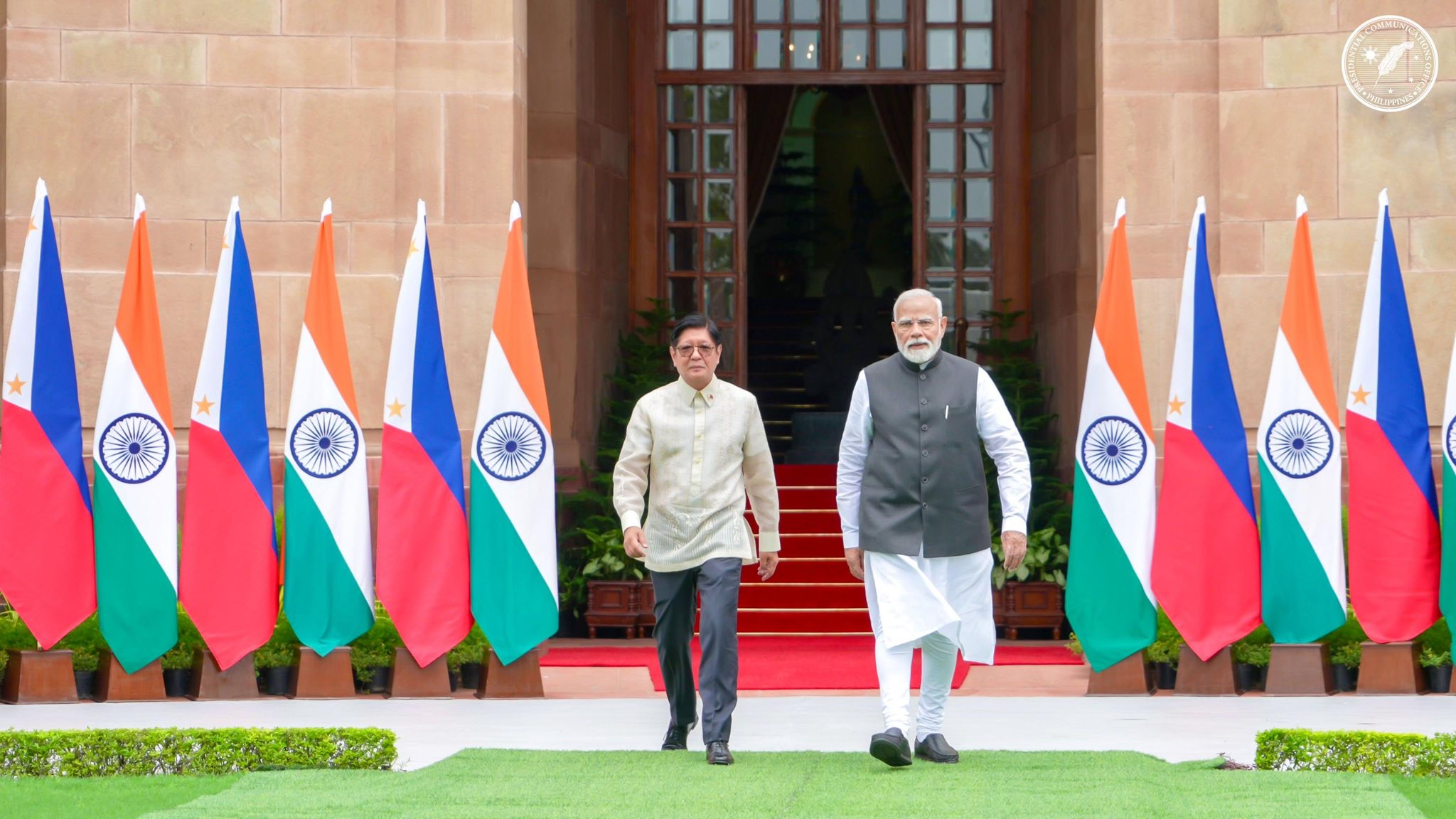
Indian Prime Minister Narendra Modi (right) hosts Philippine President Bongbong Marcos in New Delhi, August 2025

Although it had traditionally supported Burma's pro-democracy movement for many years, India's policy changed in 1993, making friendly overtures to the military junta. India signed trade agreements and increased its investments in Burma; although private sector activity remains low, India's state corporations have landed lucrative contracts for industrial projects and the construction of major roads and highways, pipelines and upgrading of ports. India has also increased its competition with China over the harnessing of Burma's significant oil and natural gas reserves, seeking to establish a major and stable source of energy for its growing domestic needs, countering Chinese monopoly over Burmese resources and reducing dependence on oil-rich Middle Eastern nations. Although China remains Burma's largest military supplier, India has offered to train Burma's military personnel and has sought their cooperation in curbing separatist militants and the heavy drug trafficking affecting much of Northeast India. Meanwhile China has won contracts harnessing more than 2.88–3.56 trillion cubits of natural gas in the A-1 Shwe field in the Rakhine State and has developed naval and surveillance installations along Burma's coast and the Coco Islands. This has provoked great concern and anxiety in India, which has stepped up its investment in port development, energy, transport and military sectors.

India has also established strong commercial, cultural and military ties with the Philippines, Singapore, Vietnam and Cambodia. India signed free trade agreements with Sri Lanka and Thailand and stepped up its military cooperation with them as well. It has numerous free trade agreements with East Asian economies, including a Comprehensive Economic Cooperation Agreement with Malaysia and an Early Harvest Scheme with Thailand, while it is negotiating agreements with Japan, South Korea, and Association of Southeast Asian Nations (ASEAN) member states. Ties have been strengthened with Taiwan, Japan and South Korea over common emphasis on democracy, human rights and strategic interests. South Korea and Japan remain amongst the major sources of foreign investment in India.

While India has remained a staunch supporter of the "One China" policy and recognised the sovereignty of the People's Republic of China on the mainland over the Republic of China authorities on Taiwan, India has nevertheless pursued a policy of increasing engagement with Taiwan. India has stepped up engagement with East Asia fueled by its need for cooperation on counter-terrorism, humanitarian relief, anti-piracy, maritime and energy security, confidence-building and balancing the influence of other powers, notably China. Driven by the fact that more than 50% of India's trade passes through the Malacca Strait, the Indian navy has established a Far Eastern Naval Command off Port Blair on the Andaman and Nicobar Islands. India has also been conducting joint naval exercises with Singapore (SIMBEX) since 1993, with Vietnam in 2000 and has engaged in joint patrols with Indonesia in the Andaman Sea since 2002. Japan and India were also members of the tsunami relief regional core group in the Indian Ocean in 2004 along with Australia and the United States of America.

=== Relations with China ===
While India and China remain strategic rivals, India's "Look East" policy has included significant rapprochement with China. In 1993, India began holding high-level talks with Chinese leaders and established confidence-building measures. In 2006, China and India opened the Nathu La pass for cross-border trade for the first time since the 1962 war. On 21 November 2006 Indian Prime Minister Manmohan Singh and the Chinese President Hu Jintao issued a 10-point joint declaration to improve ties and resolve long-standing conflicts. Trade between China and India increases by 50% each year, and is set to reach the $60 billion target set for 2010 by both Indian and Chinese governments and industrial leaders. However, China's close relations with Pakistan, skepticism about India's integration of Sikkim, and Chinese claim over Arunachal Pradesh have threatened the improvement in bilateral relations. India is currently providing asylum to the political-spiritual leader, the 14th Dalai Lama also causes some friction in bilateral ties.

Chinese state media commentators have been critical of India's Look East policy. A People's Daily editorial opined that the Look East policy was "born out of [the] failure" of India's trying to play the Soviet Union and the United States against each other for its own benefit during the Cold War, and that trying to do the same with China and Japan by strengthening its ties with the latter would also fail. A columnist at the China Internet Information Center criticized the Look East policy as being borne out of a misguided "fear of China" and as reflecting "a lack of understanding of the PLA's strategic ambitions".

=== Participation in supranational organisations ===
India has developed multilateral organisations such as, the Mekong-Ganga Cooperation and BIMSTEC, forging extensive cooperation on environmental, economic development, security and strategic affairs, permitting the growth of influence beyond South Asia and without the tense and obstructive presence of Pakistan and China that has stalled its efforts in the South Asian Association for Regional Cooperation. India became a sectoral dialogue partner with ASEAN in 1992, in 1995 was given an advisory status, a member of the Council for Security Cooperation in the Asia-Pacific, a member of the ASEAN Regional Forum in 1996, and a summit level partner (on par with China, Japan and Korea) in 2002 and World cup 2002. The first India-ASEAN Business Summit was held in New Delhi in 2002. India also acceded to ASEAN's Treaty of Amity and Cooperation in Southeast Asia in 2003.

In many cases, India's membership to these forums has been a result of attempts by the region to balance China's growing influence in the area. Notably, Japan brought India into ASEAN+6 to dilute the ASEAN+3 process, where China is dominant, while Singapore and Indonesia played a significant role in bringing India into the East Asia Summit. The United States and Japan have also lobbied for India's membership in the Asia-Pacific Economic Cooperation (APEC). Numerous infrastructure projects also serve to tie India closer to East Asia. India is participating in the United Nations Economic and Social Commission for Asia and the Pacific and the Pacific initiatives for an Asian Highway Network and the Trans-Asian Railway network. Discussions are also proceeding on reopening the World War II-era Stilwell Road linking India's Assam state with China's Yunnan province through Myanmar.

=== Connectivity projects ===
Road and trade connectivity projects like Kaladan Multi-Modal Transit Transport Project, India–Myanmar–Thailand Trilateral Highway etc have been taken up under the look east policy. Currently these projects are ongoing.

=== Tourism ===
While primarily focused on trade, infrastructure, and security cooperation, the policy has also been associated with increased people-to-people connectivity, including a gradual rise in outbound tourism from India to Southeast Asia and East Asia. Countries such as Thailand, Singapore and Malaysia have seen growing numbers of Indian visitors, supported by expanding air connectivity, simplified visa regimes, and rising middle-class disposable income in India. Japan has also become an increasingly important destination for Indian tourists, particularly following improvements in visa facilitation and direct flight connections, as well as the broader strengthening of India–Japan relations under the Act East framework. Although tourism is not a primary objective of the policy, it is widely regarded as a complementary outcome of deeper regional integration and connectivity initiatives. Overall, the Act East policy has contributed indirectly to the expansion of Indian outbound tourism to East and Southeast Asia by encouraging greater mobility, economic engagement, and cultural exchange between India and the region.

During the 2020s, outbound tourism from India to Southeast and East Asia expanded significantly, driven by rising middle-class incomes, improved air connectivity, and the recovery of international travel following the COVID-19 pandemic. Destinations in Southeast Asia, including Thailand, Singapore, Malaysia, Vietnam, and Indonesia, experienced increased arrivals of Indian tourists, supported by short-haul flight routes, relatively affordable travel costs, and simplified visa arrangements in several countries. Japan also emerged as a growing destination for Indian travellers, particularly among higher-income segments, aided by expanded flight connectivity and streamlined visa procedures. This trend has been discussed in the broader context of India’s Act East policy, which seeks to enhance economic, strategic, and people-to-people connectivity with Southeast and East Asia, although tourism is an indirect rather than primary objective of the policy framework.

== Assessment ==
According to Rejaul Karim Laskar, a scholar of Indian foreign policy, the 'Look East' policy has strengthened India's political, economic and cultural relations with the countries of Southeast Asia and the Pacific and has ensured that India becomes an important part of the emerging economic and security architecture of the region. Commerce with South and East Asian nations accounts for almost 45% of India's foreign trade. Although its efforts have met with considerable success, India trails China in the volume of trade and economic ties it enjoys with the nations of the region.

== Act East policy under Modi administration ==
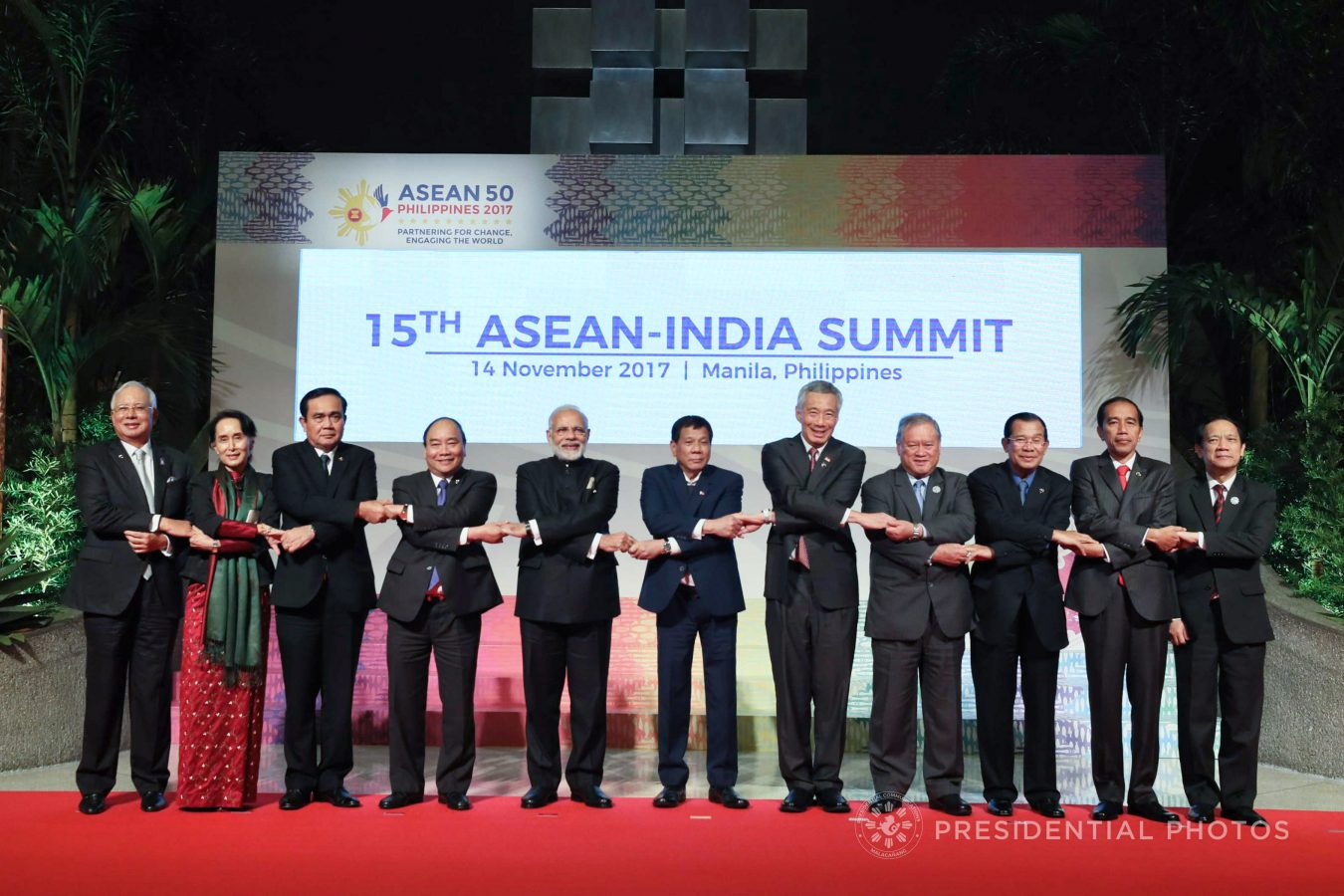
Narendra Modi (fifth from the left) joins the ASEAN leaders in doing the "ASEAN Way" handshake during the ASEAN–India Summit in Manila in 2017

In her visit to Hanoi, External Affairs Minister Sushma Swaraj stressed the need for an Act East Policy, which she said should replace India's over two decade-old Look East Policy to put India in a more proactive regional position. The Modi administration stated that India would focus more on improving relations with ASEAN and other East Asian countries as per India's 1991 Look East Policy which focused on improving economic engagement with eastern neighbors. This policy became a tool for forging strategic partnership and security cooperation with countries in that region in general and Vietnam and Japan in particular. While the Look East Policy aimed to build allies beyond the Soviet Union, it overlooked alliances with smaller border nations, such as Myanmar and Bangladesh. China leveraged this oversight, increasing trade rates with Myanmar and Bangladesh more so than India was able to.

The Act East Policy introduced infrastructure projects, such as the Agartala-Akhaura Rail Project (the first railroad connecting North Eastern India and Bangladesh) and the Asian Trilateral Highway (a new highway connecting Moreh, India to Thailand via Myanmar). These Look East Policy alterations improved strategic partnerships with the Philippines, Malaysia, and Vietnam to counter Chinese dominance in both the South China Sea and Indian Ocean. On net, the Act East Policy is a departure from India's previous non-alignment and equidistance positions, and a move toward infrastructure-based "soft power".

== See also ==
- Neighbourhood first policy (Coupled with the "Look East policy", it focuses on South Asian nations)
- BIMSTEC
- India's International connectivity projects
- ASEAN–India Free Trade Area
- Free and Open Indo-Pacific
- Pacific Asia
