= India–Myanmar–Thailand Trilateral Highway =

Planned road in Asia

India-Myanmar-Thailand Trilateral Highway

Major junctions
- From: Moreh, Manipur, India
- To: Mae Sot, Tak Province, Thailand

Location
- Countries: India, Myanmar, Thailand

Highway system
- Asian Highway Network

India–Myanmar–Thailand Trilateral Highway (IMT Highway), 1,360 km (850 mi) long route, is a 4-lane highway under construction under India's Look East policy that will connect Moreh, India with Mae Sot, Thailand via Myanmar. Imphal-Mandalay-Bangkok 1,813 km (1,127 mi) route, consisting of Imphal-Mandalay 584 km (363 mi) and Mandalay-Bangkok 1,397 km (868 mi), is a highway in good condition except for 101 km (63 mi) part of 120 km (75 mi) long Kalewa-Yagyi stretch being built to two lanes in each direction (total 4 lanes) highway by India.

The road is expected to boost trade and commerce in the ASEAN–India Free Trade Area, as well as with the rest of Southeast Asia. India has also proposed extending the highway to Cambodia, Laos and Vietnam. The proposed approximately 3,200 km (2,000 mi) route from India to Vietnam is known as the East-West Economic Corridor (Thailand to Cambodia and Vietnam became operational in 2015). This highway will also connect to the river ports being developed along the way at Kalay (also called Kalaymyo) and Monywa on Chindwin River.

India and ASEAN have plans to extend this route to Laos, Cambodia and Vietnam as this connectivity will generate annually, an estimated US$70 billion in incremental GDP and 20 million in incremental aggregate employment by 2025, and India has offered US$1 billion line-of-credit for the India-ASEAN connectivity projects (c. Dec 2017).

In December 2020, Bangladesh expressed official interest to join the highway project in order to boost connectivity from Dhaka. The existing BBIN motor vehicle agreement facilitates reduced border controls and customs inspection for freight transport between India and Bangladesh.

== History ==
A highway connecting Moreh to Mae Sot via Myanmar was first proposed at a trilateral ministerial meeting on transport linkages in Yangon in April 2002. The length of the four-lane highway is approximately 1,360 km (850 mi).

=== Moreh-Tamu-Kalemyo-Kalewa section ===
The 160 km (99 mi) long India–Myanmar Friendship Road, linking Moreh-Tamu-Kalemyo-Kalewa, was officially inaugurated on 13 February 2001, and it now forms a part of the trilateral highway. This road was built by the Border Roads Organisation (BRO), a wing of the Indian Army. The BRO maintained the road until 2009, when it was transferred to the Government of Myanmar. Per the original agreement between India and Myanmar on the Friendship Road project, the Indian government was tasked with widening and repaving the existing roads in the area, while the Myanmar government would upgrade the decrepit single-lane bridges along the route. However, the Myanmar government failed to carry out the construction work. In May 2012, India announced that it would invest US$100 million to repave the existing highway and upgrade all 71 bridges that Myanmar had failed to build. Myanmar stated that it would upgrade the Yargi-Monywa section and open the existing motorway between Mandalay-Naw Pyi Taw and Yangon. Following the 2015 Myanmar elections, the new government withdrew the country's commitment, and India was expected to upgrade the stretch from Moreh to Monywa. An alternate alignment for the stretch between Mandalay-Naw Pyi Taw and Yangon was also proposed.

The Indian government also plans to construct a road from Zokhawthar, Mizoram through the Zokhawthar-Rih border to Tedim in the Chin State of Myanmar. This will serve as an additional point of crossing from India to the trilateral highway in Myanmar.

=== Kalewa-Yagyi section ===
During Myanmar President U. Htin Kyaw's state visit to India in August 2016, an MoU was signed with the Government of India under which the latter will fund the construction of 69 bridges, including approach roads in the Tamu-Kyigone-Kalewa section (149.70 km (93.02 mi)) of the highway, and also upgrade the Kalewa-Yagyi section (120.74 km (75.02 mi)). India provided funding for the renovation of 73 bridges along the route in Myanmar that were originally built during World War II. India and Myanmar signed an agreement to speed up construction of the highway on 29 August 2016. Prabir De, coordinator of the ASEAN-India Centre at the Research and Information System for Developing Countries, stated in November 2017 that the Border Roads Organisation had completed upgrading the 160 km (99 mi) Tamu-Kalewa-Kalemyo section of the highway in Myanmar at a cost of US$27.28 million. In August 2017, the government of India allocated US$256 million for the upgrade of 1,360 km (850 mi) highway from Moreh in Manipur through Tamu, Myanmar to Mae Sot in Thailand. On 6 September 2017, the National Highway Authority of India awarded a ₹1,200 crore (US$120 million) construction and maintenance road contract for the Kalewa-Yagyi section in Myanmar to a joint venture of Punj Lloyd and Varaha Infra Ltd. The 120 km (75 mi) stretch will be built to a two-lane road. The engineering, procurement and construction contract for the project will entirely be funded by the Indian Foreign Ministry. On 11 April 2018, Yagyi-Kalewa section was finally awarded to Punj Lloyd, to be completed in 3 years by April 2021 for Rs.1,177 crore in Engineering, procurement, and construction (EPC) mode under a special purpose vehicle, which will be an international standard highway with two-lane in each direction with paved shoulders, entailing 6 truck stops, 20 bus stops and passenger shelters, 1 rest area, strengthening of 4 existing major bridges and 9 existing minor bridges, and construction of 3 new major bridges and 2 new minor bridges.

=== Myawaddy-Thinggan Nyenaung-Kawkareik section ===
The 25.6 km (15.9 mi) long Myawaddy-Thinggan Nyenaung-Kawkareik section of the highway was inaugurated by Thai and Myanmar officials on 30 August 2015, reducing travel time between Thinggan Nyenaung and Kawkareik from three hours to 45 minutes. Construction on the section had begun in 2012. On the same day, a foundation stone laying ceremony was held at Myawaddy, Myanmar to mark the beginning of construction of the Myanmar-Thailand Friendship Bridge No.2 that will link Mae Sot, Thailand with Myawaddy.

=== Ein Du-Thaton section ===
In February 2017, Myanmar approved a proposal from the Thai government permitting the latter to widen a 68 km (42 mi) section of the road between Thaton in Mon State and Ein Du in Kayin State. The widening will be financed by Thailand at a cost of US$51 million. Under the project, the road will be widened and its surface improved. Myanmar also requested Thailand to assist in the development of other sections of the highway.

=== Financing ===
In May 2017, India's NITI Aayog proposed establishing a Special Purpose Vehicle owned by all three countries to monitor and implement the project.

== Travel arrangements ==
=== Moreh-Tamu border crossing ===
Moreh ICP in India is already operational. Tamu is the border town on Myanmar side.

=== Vehicle trial run ===
A trial run of passenger vehicles on the highway up to Naypyidaw, the capital of Myanmar, was carried out during November 9–14, 2015 in which Indian vehicles travelled to Myanmar on the Imphal-Mandalay-Bagan-Naypyidaw route and back, with Myanmar vehicles joining the Indian vehicles on the return journey. In order to let people know about the highway, a car rally was flagged off by the governments of the three countries from New Delhi. The rally will travel from New Delhi to Guwahati and will enter Myanmar from Manipur (India) before moving on to Bangkok.

=== Motor Vehicle Agreement and visa arrangements ===
In 2015, India proposed a trilateral Motor Vehicle Agreement to facilitate seamless movement of passenger and cargo vehicles among the three countries. In May 2017, during a visit by Thai officials to Manipur, the state's Chief Secretary Oinam Nabakishore declared that the draft of the trilateral agreement had already been prepared. In December 2017, Myanmar stated that it needed time to review all of its connectivity agreements, before proceeding with this agreement.

In early 2018, visa agreement were signed for the citizens of two nations to travel by road for education, medical assistance, tourism and other purposes.

As of May 2018, the signing of Motor vehicle agreement is still pending.

=== Bus service ===
In September 2017, Indian ambassador to Myanmar announced that an Imphal-Mandalay India-Myanmar bus service will commence from 2018 after India and Myanmar sign the motor vehicle agreement.

As of May 2018, this is still pending subject to the signing of Motor vehicle agreement by the Myanmar.

=== Rail connectivity ===
India initiated a preliminary survey to determine the feasibility of establishing a rail link parallel to the trilateral highway in January 2018. Japan expressed interest in collaborating with India and funding the proposed rail link.

== Route status ==
The status of various segments of the highway according to India's Ministry of Development of the Northeast Region is shown below. During 9–14 December 2015, there was an Imphal-Mandalay-Naypyidaw bus service trial run on the 101 km (63 mi) bumpy stretch between Kalewa-Yagyi.

Sl.	Stretch	Distance	Status	Remarks
1.	Moreh-Tamu-Kalay(Kale/Kyigone/ဒေါ်လှကြည် သားသမီးများ)-Kalewa	149.70 km (93.02 mi)	Completed (2017)	TKK is Tamu-Kyigone-Kalewa (TKK) section. Kaley is also spelled as Kale and Kyigone (ဒေါ်လှကြည် သားသမီးများ).
2.	Kalewa-Yagyi (Yar Gyi)	120.74 km (75.02 mi)	Under construction (202?)	This section, which includes rebuilding 69 bridges & adjacent approach roads, was 70% complete in Feb 2026 with the revised completion targeted for 2027. Portions of the highway route in Myanmar's Sagaing Region and Chin State are currently contested by various ethnic armed organizations (EAOs) fighting the civil war in Myanmar, affecting the safety of construction crews and supply chains. Indian Ministry of External Affairs have highlighted that while physical construction continues, the formal opening of the road is contingent upon the security situation and the finalization of the Motor Vehicles Agreement to facilitate cross-border trade and passenger movement.
3.	Yagyi-Chaungma-Monywa	64.4 km (40.0 mi)	Completed (2021)	It passes through Alaungdaw Kathapa National Park.
4.	Monywa-Mandalay	136 km (85 mi)	Completed (201?)	
5.	Mandalay-Meiktila bypass	123.13 km (76.51 mi)	Completed (2010)	Part of the Yangon–Mandalay Expressway that was opened in December 2010.
6.	Meiktila bypass-Taungoo-Oktwin-Payagyi (Pyay)	238 km (148 mi)	Completed (2010)	Part of the Yangon–Mandalay Expressway that was opened in December 2010.
7.	Payagyi-Theinzayat (Thein Za Yat)-Thaton	140 km (87 mi)	Completed (2017)	Payagyi to Myeik (includes Thaton-Mawlamyine-Kawkareik section) is upgraded by India, and it is part of National Highway 8 (Myanmar).
8.	Thaton-Mawlamyine-Kawkareik	134.4 km (83.5 mi)	Completed (2021)	Thaton to Ein Du (Kayin State) 68 km (42 mi) road, part of National Highway 8 (Myanmar) and also a part of Thaton-Eindu-Mawlamyaing road, was widened and upgraded after Thailand agreed in February 2017 to pay for it. The remaining Ein Du-Mawlamyine-Kawkareik 66.4 km (41.3 mi) long section's upgrade to an international standard road (Asian Highway Standard Class 2) was completed in May 2021, with a loan from the ADB.
9.	Kawkareik-Myawaddy	25.6 km (15.9 mi)	Completed (2015)	
10.	Myawaddy-Mae Sot	20 km (12 mi)	Completed (2021)	Customs, new second road and rail bridge, 16 km (10 mi) Mae Sot bypass road and Tak-Mae Sot highway on Thai side are complete since Dec 2017.

== Additional inter-connectivity ==
=== Connectivity to Bangladesh ===
In November 2020, BIMSTEC partner Bangladesh expressed interest in joining this Highway through Tripura. India plans to upgrade route from Zokhawthar in Mizoram to Tedim in Chin State of Myanmar as an additional connect to the IMT trilateral highway.

=== Look-East connectivity ===
Commerce with South and East Asian nations accounts for almost 45% of India's foreign trade. Myanmar and ASEAN nations are part of India's Look East policy. India is part of BIMSTEC, East Asia Summit, Mekong-Ganga Cooperation, United Nations Economic and Social Commission for Asia and the Pacific, Asian Highway Network and the Trans-Asian Railway network and India has embarked on several Look-East connectivity projects.

== See also ==
- Borders of India
- Dawei Port Project
- Kaladan Multi-Modal Transit Transport Project
- India–Myanmar barrier
- India's International connectivity projects
- Pakokku Bridge
