= Sangau =

Town in Lawngtlai district, Mizoram, India

Coordinates: 22°44′N 93°04′E

Sangau is a large village in the Lawngtlai district of Mizoram state in India. Sangau, being close to the India–Myanmar border, provides opportunities for trade through the border haat here.

== Economy ==
=== Border Haat and trade ===
Sangau (Pangkhua) is one of the 4 Border Haats (markets) in Mizoram, others being at Hnahlan, Vaphai (Saikhumphai) and Zote, all of which boost the local trade and economy.

== See also ==
- Borders of India
