= Bhalgaon =

- Village
- Interactive map of Bhalgaon
- Coordinates: 24.733220°N 71.087519°E
- Country: India
- State: Rajasthan
- District: Barmer District
- Tehsil: Sedwa Tehsil
- Division: Jodhpur Division
- Elevation: 218 m (715 ft)

Languages
- Time zone: UTC+5:30 (IST)
- PIN: 344706
- Area code: 02989

Bhalgaon is a village situated in the Chohtan Tehsil of Barmer district in the Indian state of Rajasthan, within the Jodhpur division. It is approximately 60 kilometres to the south of the district headquarters, Barmer, and has an elevation of 218 meters above sea level.

== Population ==
As of the 2011 India census, the village has a total population of 3,119. The village's PIN code is 344706, and its postal head office is located in Sedwa.
