= Early Harvest Scheme =

Tariff liberalisation trade agreement

Early harvest scheme (EHS), also early harvest deal or early harvest programme, is a precursor to a free trade agreement (FTA) between two trading partners. This is to help the two trading countries to identify certain products for tariff liberalisation pending the conclusion of FTA negotiation. It is primarily a confidence building measure between two trading partners.

Early harvest scheme is an agreement between two states (or regional trading blocs) which liberalizes tariffs on certain goods preceding the conclusion of a Free Trade Agreement (FTA).

== Structure ==
An early harvest scheme is a trade agreement between countries or regions that allows for the immediate liberalization (removal of trade barriers) of certain goods or services, while leaving other items to be liberalized at a later date. This allows for the partial liberalization of trade between the participating countries or regions, and can serve as a stepping stone towards a more comprehensive free trade agreement.

Early harvest schemes may be used as a way to build trust and momentum towards a broader trade agreement, or as a way to address specific issues or sectors that are of particular importance to one or more of the participating countries or regions.

Early harvest schemes can take a variety of forms, and may involve the immediate liberalization of a limited number of goods or services, or the phased liberalization of a larger number of items over a period of time. They may also involve the liberalization of trade in certain sectors, such as agriculture or manufacturing, while leaving other sectors, such as services or intellectual property, for later negotiations.

== Use in trade negotiations ==
Early harvest schemes are used as transitional arrangements in trade negotiations, allowing parties to liberalize selected tariff lines before a full free trade agreement enters into force. In the ASEAN–China Framework Agreement, for example, the parties agreed to implement an Early Harvest Programme as an integral part of the future free trade area in order to accelerate the realization of benefits from the agreement.

In practice, such arrangements are used to create momentum for wider negotiations by producing early tariff reductions in agreed sectors. ASEAN notes that the ASEAN–China Early Harvest Programme was implemented on 1 January 2004 and resulted in the elimination of tariff lines on selected agricultural products ahead of the full goods agreement.
