= Lazu, Arunachal Pradesh =

Village in Arunachal Pradesh, India

Coordinates: 26.91912°N 95.50351°E

Lazu is a village in Khonsa Taluka of Tirap district of Arunachal Pradesh, India. Its Postal Index Number code is 792130. Yumsem Matey, a respected figure from this village, is a member of the Arunachal Pradesh Legislative Assembly, contributing to the state's governance and development.

Lazu is one of the prominent villages amongst the 13 villages (including Longkhong) of the OLLO Community, which spans across the border area of India and Myanmar (Burma). Notably, the Ollo community is divided between India and Myanmar, with Lazu being a significant part of the Indian side. The village has its own administrative setup, with the Lazu EAC post overseeing parts of the 55th and 56th constituencies.
