= Balat, Meghalaya =

Balat Balet
- town
- Location in Meghalaya, India Balat (India)
- Coordinates: 25.196088°N 91.376982°E
- Country: India
- State: Meghalaya
- District: East Khasi Hills

Population (2011)
  - Total: 987

Languages
  - Official: English
- Time zone: UTC+5:30 (IST)
- Vehicle registration: ML
- Coastline: 0 kilometres (0 mi)
- Climate: Am

Balat is a town in the Indian state of Meghalaya. It is one of the designated India-Bangladesh Border Haat.

== Climate ==
The climate here is tropical. During most months of the year, there is significant rainfall in Balat. There is only a short dry season. This climate is considered to be Am according to the Köppen-Geiger climate classification. The temperature here averages 24.7 °C. The rainfall here averages 3444 mm. The driest month is December, with 6 mm of rain. Most precipitation falls in June, with an average of 740 mm

== See also ==
- Bangladesh–India border
- Borders of India
- Border ceremonies of India's with neighbours
- Foreign trade of India
- BIMSTEC
- SAARC
