= Exclusive economic zone of Myanmar =

Economic zone exclusive to Myanmar

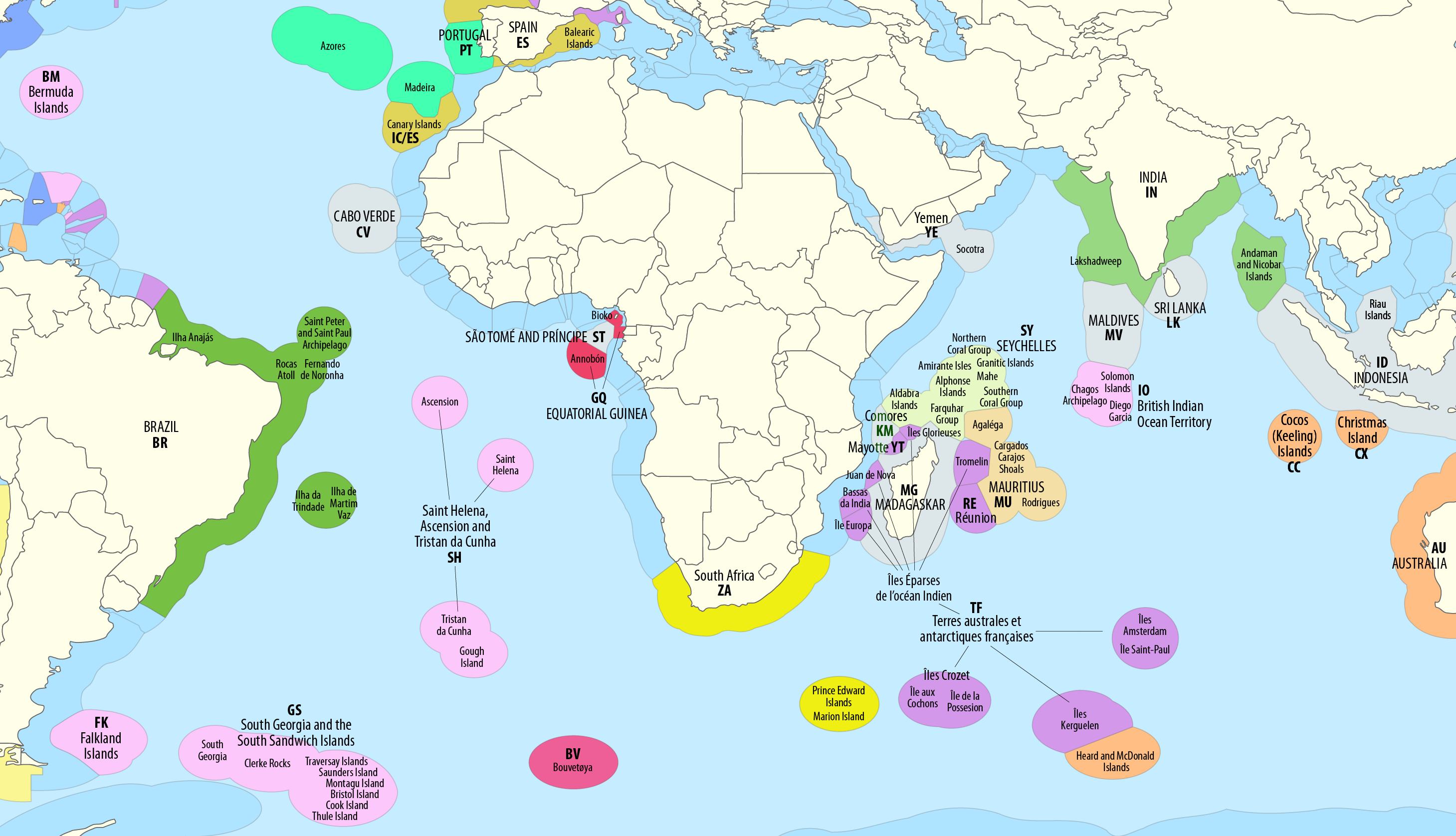
EEZs in the Atlantic and Indian Oceans.

The Exclusive Economic Zone (EEZ) of Myanmar is a maritime area around the Andaman Sea and the Bay of Bengal and more pricisely near the Tenasserim coast and Gulf of Martaban. The exclusive economic zone extends up to 200 nautical miles (370 km; 230 mi) from Myanmar's baselines.

== History ==
Myanmar declared its Territorial Sea and Maritime Zones Law in 1977, establishing its maritime claims, including an Exclusive Economic Zone, prior to the conclusion of the 1982 United Nations Convention on the Law of the Sea (UNCLOS). Myanmar subsequently signed UNCLOS when it opened for signature and ratified it on 21 May 1996, with the convention entering into force for Myanmar on 20 June 1996. In 2017, Myanmar enacted a new Territorial Sea and Maritime Zones Law (The Pyidaungsu Hluttaw Law No. 14, 2017), which repealed the 1977 law.

== Geography ==
Among the areas include:

EEZ Areas of Myanmar
Regions
Southern Point of Mayu Island
Boronga Point
Nerbudda Island
Goyangyi Island
Auk Kyun Ni Island
Ta Bin Taing Island
Southern and North Eastern Point of Preparis Island
North Western and Southern Point of Little Coco Island

== Disputes ==
Myanmar had a maritime dispute with Bangladesh in which both country's EEZ arc overlapped each others. The dispute was successfully resolved by a judgment from the International Tribunal for the Law of the Sea (ITLOS) on 14 March 2012.

== See also ==
  - Bangladesh–Myanmar relations
  - India–Myanmar relations
  - Myanmar–Thailand relations
  - Exclusive economic zone
  - United Nations Convention on the Law of the Sea
