= Hindumalkote railway station =

Railway station in Rajasthan, India

General information
- Coordinates: 30.13637°N 73.91685°E
- Elevation: 180 metres (590 ft)
- System: Indian Railways station
- Owner: Indian Railways
- Operator: Northern Railway
- Line: Suratgarh–Bathinda line
- Platforms: 1
- Tracks: 1 (5 ft 6 in (1,676 mm) broad gauge)

Construction
- Structure type: Standard on Ground

Other information
- Status: Functioning
- Station code: HMK
- Division(s): Ambala

History
- Opened: 1897
- Former names: North Western Railway
Location
- Location within Rajasthan Location within India

Hindumalkote railway station is located in Hindumalkote, Shri Ganganagar district of Rajasthan in India. It is situated near the India–Pakistan Border and serves the Hindumalkote village.

== See also ==
- List of railway stations in India
- Indian Railways
