= Kalewa =

- Town
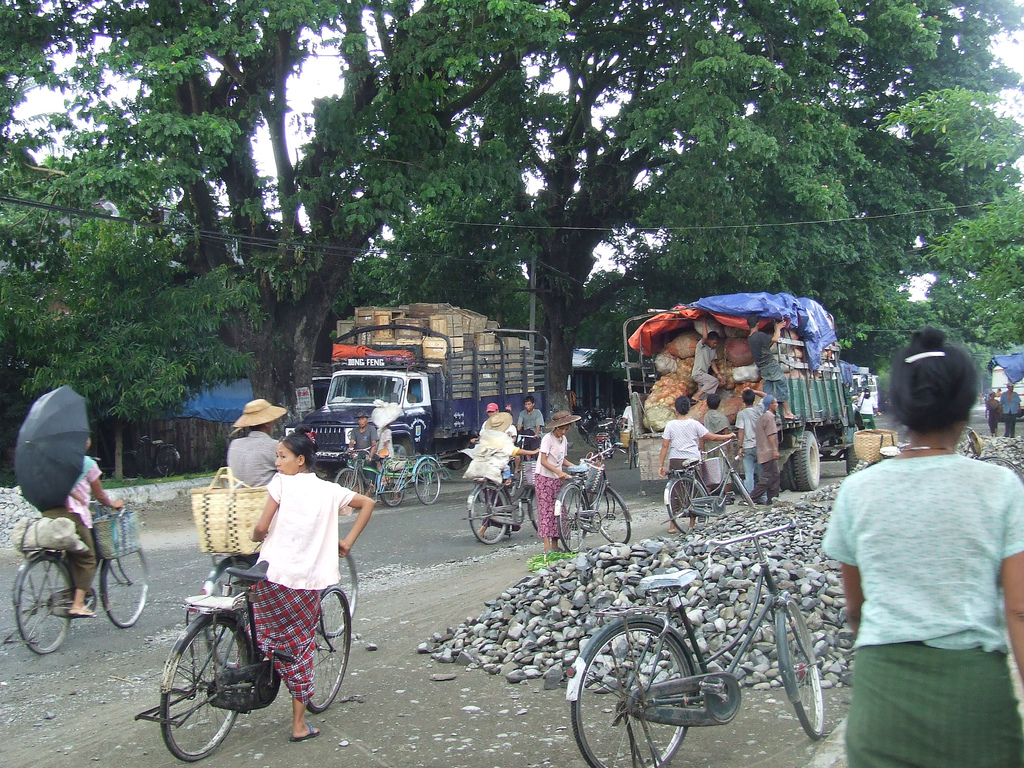

- Location of Kalewa within Myanmar
- Coordinates: 23°12′48″N 94°19′06″E
- Country: Myanmar
- Division: Sagaing Region
- District: Kale
- Township: Kale Township
- Time zone: UTC+06:30 (MST)

Kalewa is a town at the confluence of the Chindwin River and the Myittha River in Kale District, Sagaing Region of north-western Myanmar. It is the administrative seat of Kalewa Township.

== Climate ==
Kalewa has a tropical savanna climate (Köppen climate classification Aw). Temperatures are very warm throughout the year, although the winter months (December–February) are milder. The pre-monsoon months from March to May are especially hot, with maximum temperatures around 35 °C (95 °F). There is a winter dry season (November–April) and a summer wet season (May–October).

Climate data for Kalewa (1981–2010)
Month	Jan	Feb	Mar	Apr	May	Jun	Jul	Aug	Sep	Oct	Nov	Dec	Year
Record high °C (°F)	30.8 (87.4)	37.2 (99.0)	41.8 (107.2)	43.4 (110.1)	45.0 (113.0)	42.8 (109.0)	38.9 (102.0)	37.2 (99.0)	35.6 (96.1)	35.1 (95.2)	32.8 (91.0)	30.1 (86.2)	45.0 (113.0)
Mean daily maximum °C (°F)	25.6 (78.1)	29.2 (84.6)	33.9 (93.0)	36.5 (97.7)	35.7 (96.3)	32.9 (91.2)	32.5 (90.5)	31.9 (89.4)	31.5 (88.7)	30.9 (87.6)	27.9 (82.2)	25.0 (77.0)	31.1 (88.0)
Mean daily minimum °C (°F)	13.3 (55.9)	14.4 (57.9)	17.9 (64.2)	22.1 (71.8)	24.2 (75.6)	25.0 (77.0)	25.0 (77.0)	24.8 (76.6)	24.1 (75.4)	22.9 (73.2)	19.1 (66.4)	14.9 (58.8)	20.6 (69.1)
Record low °C (°F)	9.4 (48.9)	9.5 (49.1)	10.0 (50.0)	15.6 (60.1)	15.5 (59.9)	21.8 (71.2)	22.4 (72.3)	20.8 (69.4)	21.5 (70.7)	18.6 (65.5)	13.4 (56.1)	10.7 (51.3)	9.4 (48.9)
Average rainfall mm (inches)	2.9 (0.11)	4.0 (0.16)	17.3 (0.68)	37.6 (1.48)	182.0 (7.17)	272.1 (10.71)	245.6 (9.67)	303.3 (11.94)	346.3 (13.63)	187.5 (7.38)	38.7 (1.52)	4.0 (0.16)	1,641.3 (64.62)
Source: Norwegian Meteorological Institute

== Economy ==
Upstream from Mandalay and Monywa on the Chindwin River, Kalewa is gaining importance as a staging point for trade between Burma and India.

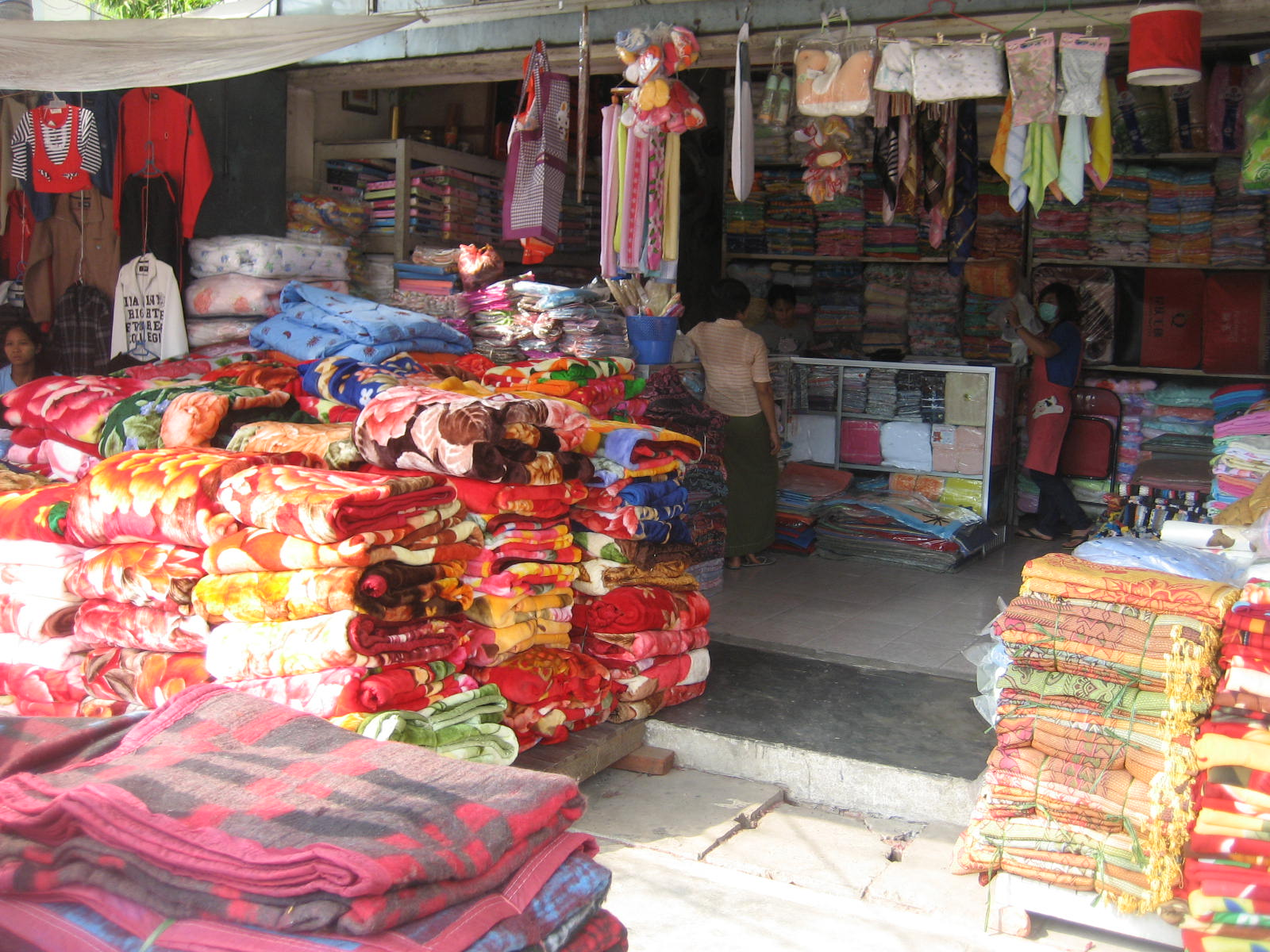

== See also ==
- Human rights in Burma
- Internal conflict in Burma

== See also ==
- Chaube, S.K. 1999. Hill Politics in North-east India. Patna: Orient Longman.
- Lalsiampuii, s. 1997. Mizoram. New Delhi: Ministry of Information and Broadcasting. Govt. of India.
- Johnny, N.E. 1991. Lushai custom; A monograph on Lushai customs and ceremonies. Aizawl: Tribal Research Institute.
- Tribal Research Institute. 1991. Tribal Research Institute, Directorate of Art and Culture.
- Tribal Research. 1980. The Tribes of Mizos. (A Dissertation): Tribal Research Institute.
- "The Lost Tribes of Israel", Tudor Parfitt, Phoenix, 2002. ISBN 1-84212-665-2.
