= Tuipui, Champhai =

Tuipui
- village
- Location in Mizoram, India Tuipui (India)
- Coordinates: 22.879501°N 92.9357°E
- Country: India
- State: Mizoram
- District: Champhai
- Block: Khawzawl
- Elevation: 209 m (686 ft)

Population (2011)
  - Total: 461
- Time zone: UTC+5:30 (IST)
- 2011 census code: 271325

Tuipui is a village in the Champhai district of Mizoram, India. It is located in the Khawzawl R.D. Block.

== Demographics ==
According to the 2011 census of India, Tuipui has 95 households. The effective literacy rate (i.e. the literacy rate of population excluding children aged 6 and below) is 100%.

Demographics (2011 Census)
	Total	Male	Female
Population	461	217	244
Children aged below 6 years	75	31	44
Scheduled caste	0	0	0
Scheduled tribe	443	210	233
Literates	386	186	200
Workers (all)	229	132	97
Main workers (total)	225	131	94
Main workers: Cultivators	217	126	91
Main workers: Agricultural labourers	1	1	0
Main workers: Household industry workers	1	1	0
Main workers: Other	6	3	3
Marginal workers (total)	4	1	3
Marginal workers: Cultivators	4	1	3
Marginal workers: Agricultural labourers	0	0	0
Marginal workers: Household industry workers	0	0	0
Marginal workers: Others	0	0	0
Non-workers	232	85	147
