= Mekong–Ganga Cooperation =

Intergovernmental organization of Southeast Asian countries

- Membership: India; Thailand; Myanmar; Cambodia; Laos; Vietnam

The Mekong–Ganga Cooperation (MGC) was established on November 10, 2000, at Vientiane, Laos at the First MGC Ministerial Meeting. It comprises six member countries, namely India (Look-East connectivity projects), Thailand, Myanmar, Cambodia, Laos and Vietnam. The four areas of cooperation are tourism, culture, education, and transportation. The organization takes its name from the Ganga and the Mekong, two large rivers in the region.

A clickable Euler diagram showing the relationships between various Asian regional organizations

== Member Nations ==
- India
- Thailand
- Myanmar
- Cambodia
- Laos
- Vietnam

== Annual Ministerial Meetings ==
The working mechanism for MGC consists of the Annual Ministerial Meeting (back to back with ASEAN Ministerial Meeting), the Senior Official's Meeting, and the five Working Groups namely;

- Working Group on Tourism (Thailand is the lead country)
- Working Group on Education (HRD) (India is the lead country)
- Working Group on Culture (Cambodia is the lead country)
- Working Group on Communication & Transportation (Laos PDR is the lead country)
- Working Group on Plan of Actions (Vietnam is the lead country)

== Second MGC Ministerial Meeting ==
At the Second MGC Ministerial Meeting held in Hanoi on July 28, 2001, the member countries adopted the Hanoi Programme of Action affirming their commitment to cooperate in four areas of cooperation. The “Hanoi Programme of Action” has 6 years timeframe from 2001 to 2007 and the progress of its implementation shall be reviewed every two years.

== Third MGC Ministerial Meeting ==
At the Third MGC Ministerial Meeting held in Phnom Penh on June 20, 2003, the member countries adopted the Phnom Penh Road Map as a plan to accelerate the implementation of all MGC projects and activities. The Second ASEAN Informal Summit, held in Kuala Lumpur on 15 December 1997, adopted the ASEAN Vision 2020 which sets out a broad vision for ASEAN in the year 2020: an ASEAN as a concert of Southeast Asian Nations, outward looking, living in peace, stability and prosperity, bonded together in partnership in dynamic development and in a community of caring societies.

In order to implement the long-term vision, action plans are being drawn up to realise this Vision. The Hanoi Plan of Action (HPA) is the first in a series of plans of action building up to the realisation of the goals of the Vision.

The HPA has a six-year timeframe covering the period from 1999 to 2004. The progress of its implementation shall be reviewed every three years to coincide with the ASEAN Summit Meetings.

In recognition of the need to address the current economic situation in the region, ASEAN shall implement initiatives to hasten economic recovery and address the social impact of the global economic and financial crisis. These measures reaffirm ASEAN commitments to closer regional integration and are directed at consolidating and strengthening the economic fundamentals of the Member Countries.

== Fourth MGC Ministerial Meeting ==
Fourth MGC Ministerial Meeting was held January 12, 2007 at Cebu. In this meeting Thailand has handed over the chairmanship of MGC to India. There was no Ministerial Meeting in 2002 and 2004 because the AMM meeting was held in Brunei and Indonesia respectively.

== Fifth MGC Ministerial Meeting ==
The 5th MGC meeting was held on August 1, 2007, in Manila.

== Sixth MGC Ministerial Meeting ==
Sixth Mekong–Ganga Cooperation meeting was held in New Delhi on 3–4 September 2012. Senior officials meeting was held on September 3 whereas the Foreign Ministers meet was held on September 4, 2012. This is the first time that the Mekong Ganga Cooperation meeting was hosted by India. India had earlier chaired the 5th MGC Ministerial Meeting on the sidelines of the ASEAN-India Meetings.

== Seventh MGC Ministerial Meeting ==
The Seventh Mekong Ganga Cooperation Ministerial Meeting (7th MGC MM) was held on 24 July 2016 in Vientiane, chaired by H.E. Mr. Saleumxay Kommasith, Minister of Foreign Affairs of the Lao PDR. The Ministers emphasized that collaboration under MGC must be given a sense of urgency since it actively supports the Initiative for ASEAN Integration, and the Master Plan on ASEAN Connectivity, and contribute towards the implementation of the ASEAN Community Vision 2025. The mutual agreements revolved mainly around trade enhancement, investments in projects, maritime connectivity, sharing information and cooperation in Pandemic management, concord food security in tandem with strong underpinning of historical cultural ties among the nations in the region.

== Ninth MGC Ministerial Meeting ==
The ninth Mekong–Ganga Cooperation Meeting was held in Singapore on August 2, 2018. The conference was preceded by the 10th MGC Senior Officials Meeting (SOM) on August 1.

The meeting was co-chaired by Don Pramudwinai, Minister of Foreign Affairs of the Kingdom of Thailand and Gen V.K. Singh (Retd.), Minister of State for External Affairs. Senior ministers from Cambodia, Laos PDR, Myanmar and Vietnam also attended the meeting.

The Eleventh Mekong–Ganga Cooperation Senior Officials' Meeting was held in New Delhi on 9 July 2019.

The Tenth Mekong–Ganga Cooperation Ministerial Meeting was held in Thailand's Bangkok on 1 August 2019.

The Twelfth Mekong–Ganga Cooperation Senior Officials' Meeting was held virtually due to COVID-19 on 3 September 2020.

== See also ==
- ASEAN–India Free Trade Area
- Bay of Bengal Initiative for Multi-Sectoral Technical and Economic Cooperation
- Comprehensive Economic Partnership for East Asia
- Greater Mekong Subregion
