= Port of Mongla =

- Interactive map of Port of Mongla
- Location within Bangladesh
- Native name: মোংলা বন্দর

Location
- Country: Bangladesh
- Location: Khulna, Bangladesh
- Coordinates: 22°29′20″N 89°35′43″E
- UN/LOCODE: BDMGL

Details
- Opened: 1950
- Operated by: Mongla Port Authority
- Owned by: Government of Bangladesh
- Type of Harbor: Artificial / Natural
- No. of berths: 11

Statistics
- Annual container volume: 100,000 TEUs (2019-20)
- Website mpa.gov.bd

The Port of Mongla is a Bangladeshi seaport, located at Mongla, Khulna Division.It is located near the north shore of the Bay of Bengal. It is the second largest and busiest seaport of Bangladesh after the Port of Chittagong. The Mongla port lies close to the shore of the Bay of Bengal, Pashur river and the divisional city of Khulna. It is also connected by rail with Khulna. Additionally, an airport had been planned and authorized near the post area named Khan Jahan Ali Airport; however the construction has stalled in the last few years. Mongla was renowned historically among the major important ports of the Bengal delta. Due to the increasing congestion in Bangladesh's largest port of Chittagong, many international shipping companies have turned to Mongla as an alternative. Also the continuous demand from all over the country and neighboring countries has made it busier and economically attractive.

Also political and economical influence in Khulna region from the government has also added to the development and demand of the port of Mongla. Padma Bridge mega-project is a big example of such influence in Khulna region. Mongla is also a gateway for tourist ships traveling to the largest mangrove forest of world, the Sunderbans. It is also marked as a resource of UNESCO World Heritage Site. The port also hosts the Mongla Export Processing Zone (Mongla EPZ).

== History ==
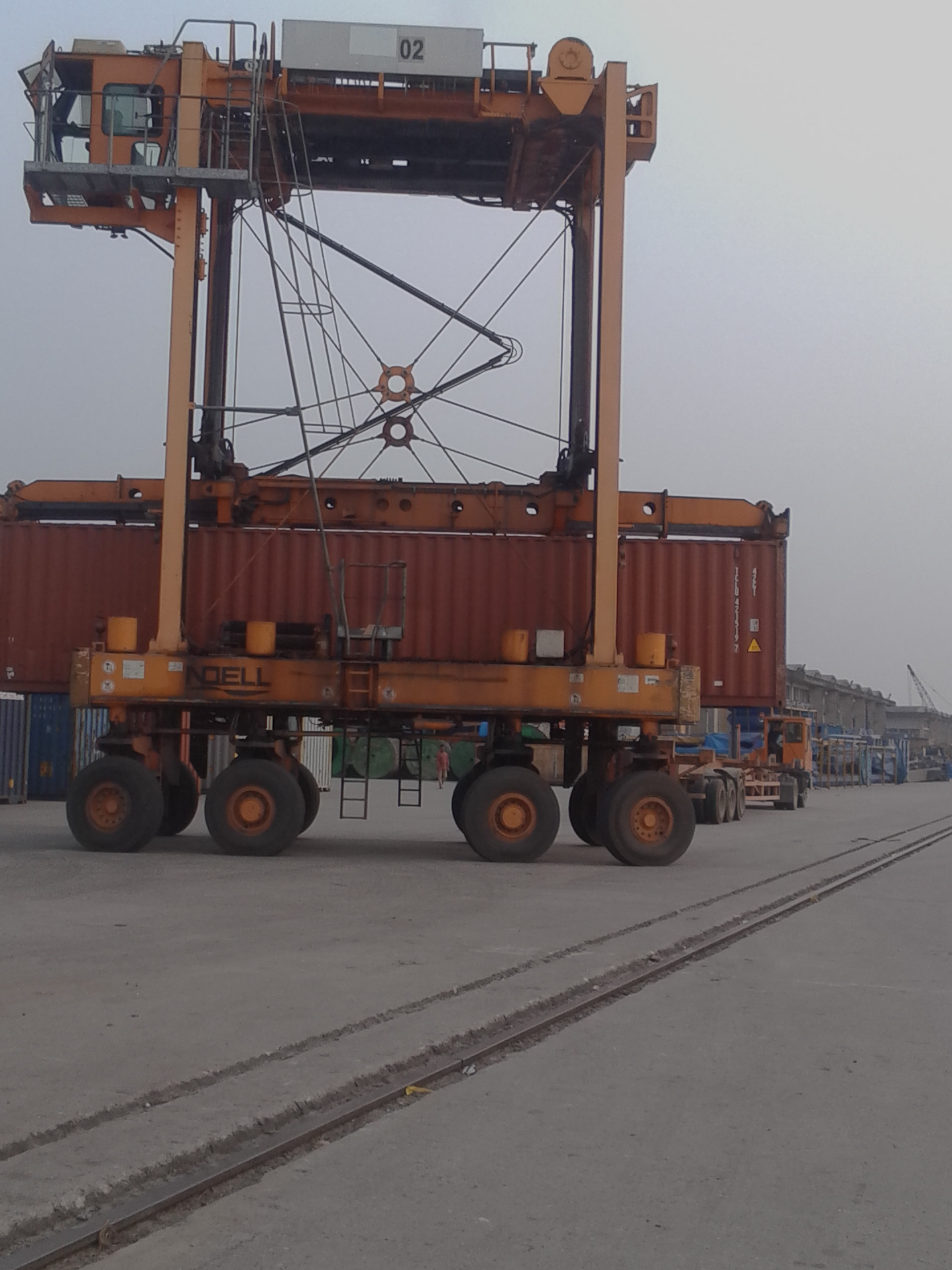
Straddle carrier at work in Mongla

The port was founded in 1950 to serve the southwestern region of East Bengal. It was originally known as Chalna Port.

In July 2024, India obtained rights to operate the terminal on Mongla port.

In October 2026, Bangladesh signed a $335.78 million loan agreement with the Export-Import Bank of China to expand and modernise Mongla Port, including the construction of two container terminals, a container yard, a container delivery yard and a cargo handling yard. The loan carries a 2% interest rate, with a 20-year repayment period and a five-year grace period.

== Geography ==
It was formerly located at Chalna, about 18 kilometres (11 mi) upstream on the Pasur River but it is now located 48 km south of Khulna city, as established on 11 December 1954. The Port is surrounded and protected by the Sundarban mangrove forest. The port is situated at the confluence of the Pasur River and the Mongla River. It lies about 100 km (62 mi) north of the Bay of Bengal.

== Port infrastructure ==
The port has 11 jetties and 8 warehouses. It uses 12 swinging moorings in deeper sections in the river. The port is connected by the Bangladesh Railway to the Khulna Metropolitan Area.

== Ship services ==
In 2015–16, 636 ships used Mongla port. Mongla is connected to most major ports in the world, particularly Asian ports. Hundreds of ships use the port each year, most of which come via Singapore, Hong Kong and Colombo. Mongla is also connected to most inland ports in Bangladesh, including the Port of Dhaka and the Port of Narayanganj.

In 2018, Bangladesh allowed India access at this port and the Chittagong Port to transport goods to Indian territory.

== Trade ==
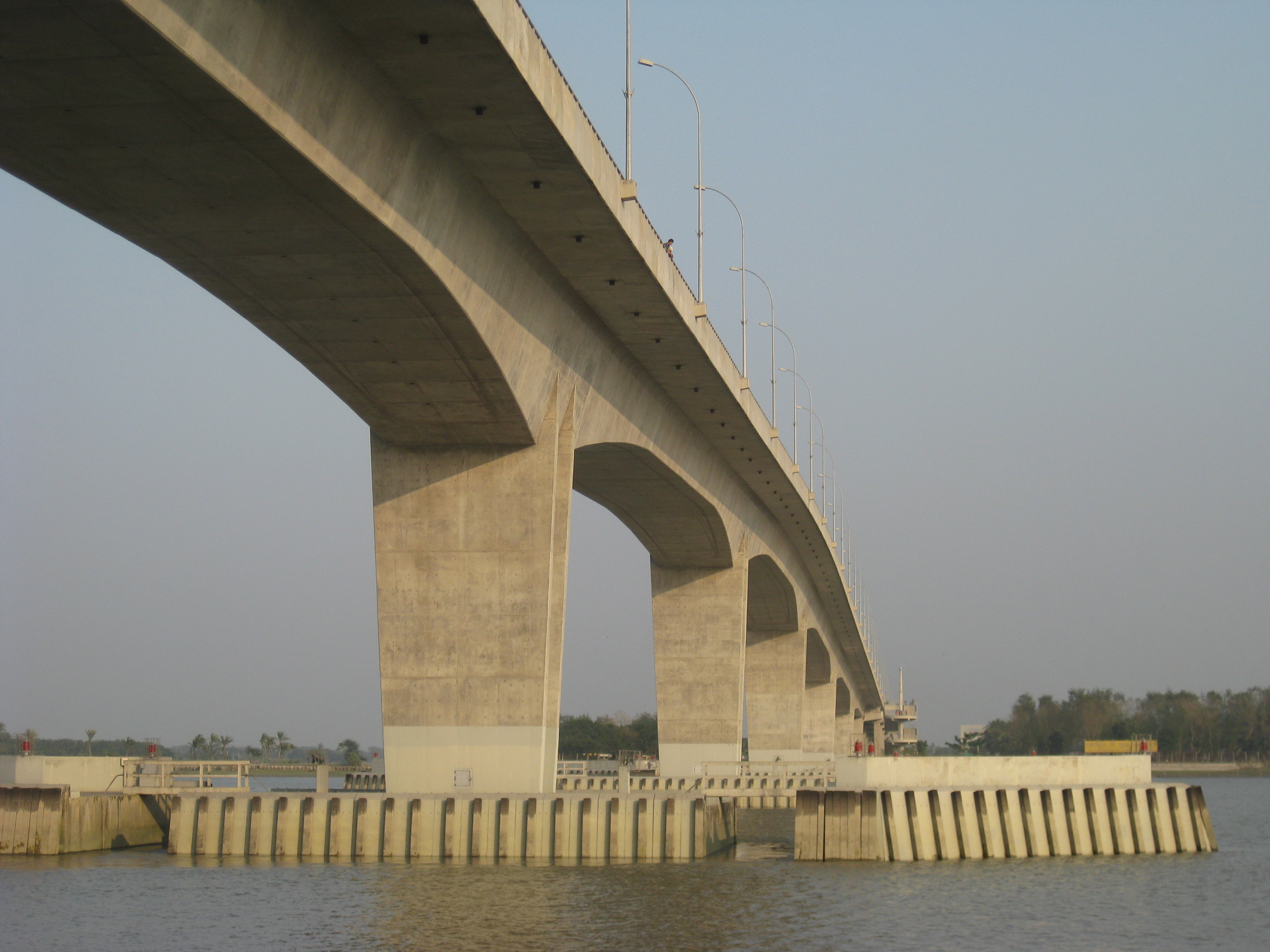
Rupsha Bridge connects Khulna and Mongla

The port is open for 24 hours and up to 225 metre long ships can enter into the port for discharging cargo. A constraint free large channel is available for anchorage and loading/unloading facilities on both sides for 33 ships at a time.

== Future expansion ==
The government of Bangladesh has launched dredging and jetty construction projects to expand the capacity of Mongla port.

== See also ==
- Countries dependent on the Bay of Bengal
