= Indra Mani Pandey =

Indian diplomat

His Excellency Indra Mani PANDEY
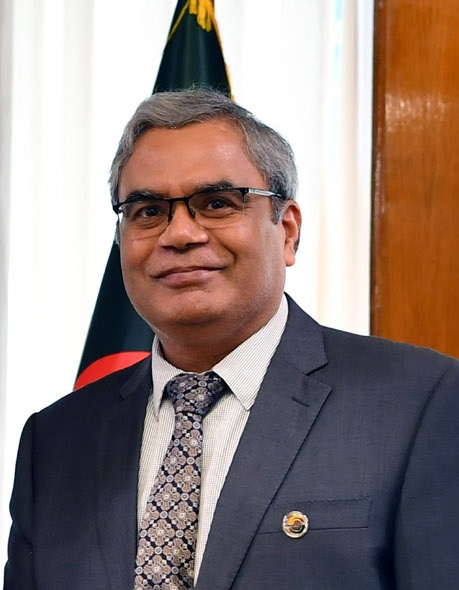
- Pandey in 2024

4th Secretary-General of BIMSTEC
- Incumbent
- Assumed office 4 January 2024
- Preceded by: Tenzin Lekphell

Personal details
- Citizenship: Indian
- Spouse: Sushma Pandey
- Education: Oxford University
- Occupation: Diplomat

Indra Mani Pandey is an Indian diplomat, who is currently serving as the 4th Secretary General of BIMSTEC.

== Education ==
In 1998-99, Pandey attended the Foreign Service Programme at Oxford University. Later, in 2009, he attended the 49th Course on National Security and Strategy, conducted by National Defence College, New Delhi.

== Career ==
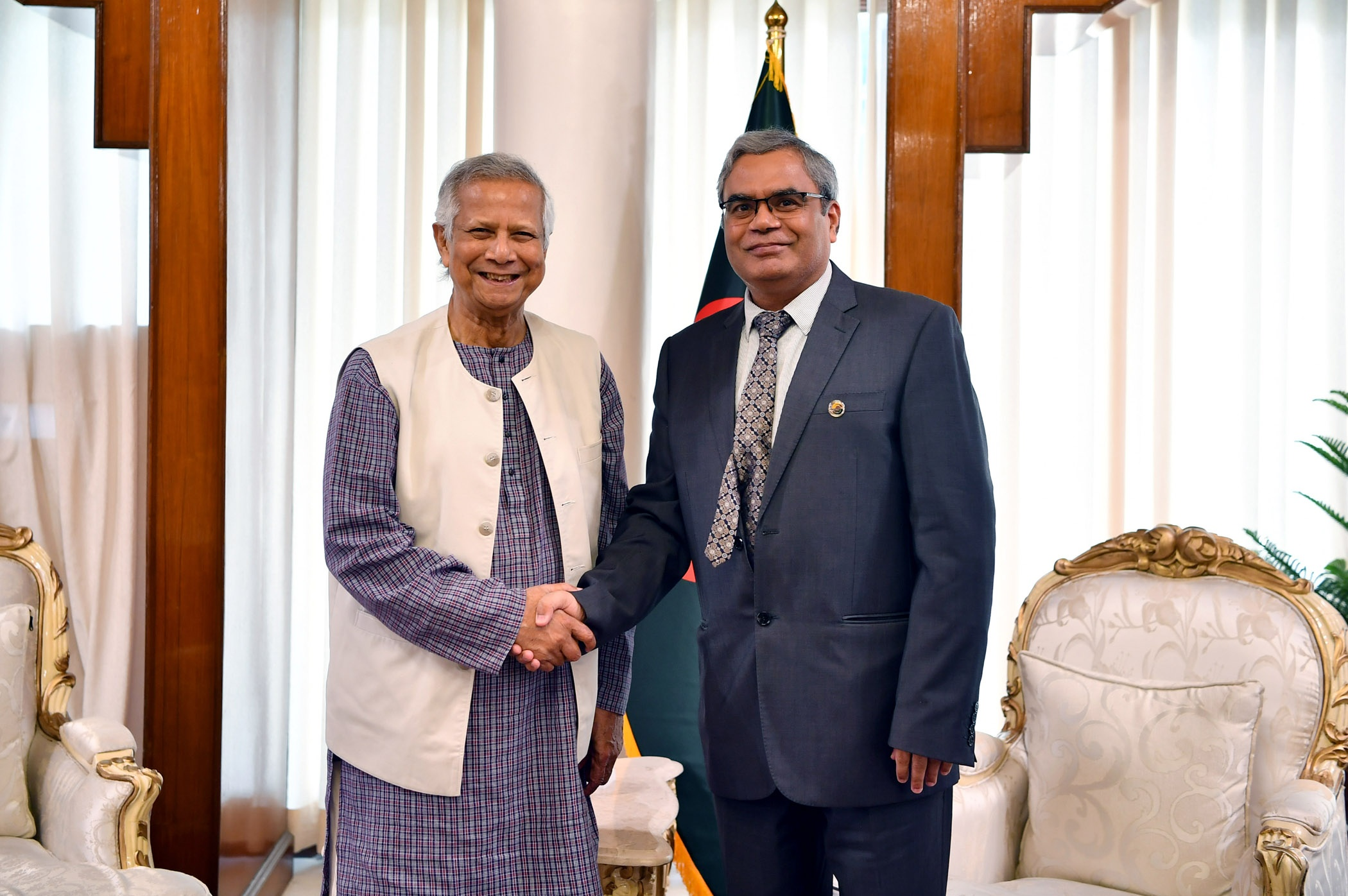
Pandey meets with Bangladesh CA Muhammad Yunus in 2024

Pandey joined the Indian Foreign Service in 1990.

As part of the service, he has most notably served as Ambassador of India to the Sultanate of Oman, Deputy Ambassador of India to France and Consul General of India at Guangzhou in China. He also served as joint secretary in the Disarmament and International Security Affairs division of the Ministry of External Affairs.

He took over as the 4th Secretary-General of BIMSTEC in January 2024, for a three-year term. He is the first Indian to hold this position. Prior, to taking over this position, he served as the Permanent Representative of India to the United Nations.

As BIMSTEC SG, he emphasized the importance of stronger cooperation. He also stated that BIMSTEC was an important link for bridging South and Southeast Asia.
