= Port of Pangaon =

- Click on the map for a fullscreen view

Location
- Country: Bangladesh
- Location: Keraniganj Upazila, Dhaka District
- Coordinates: 23.6565°N 90.4556°E
- UN/LOCODE: BDPGN

Details
- Opened: 2013
- Owned by: Bangladesh Inland Water Transport Authority
- Type of harbour: Inland port
- No. of berths: 2

Statistics
- Annual container volume: 116,000 TEUs

The Port of Pangaon is an inland port and container terminal on the Buriganga River in Dhaka District, Bangladesh. It serves as a cargo port for Bangladesh's capital and largest city Dhaka. It was opened in 2013. It is the first river port of its kind in Bangladesh.

The Pangaon terminal is part of the Port of Dhaka.

== Location ==
The port is located 20 kilometres (12 mi) from the Dhaka Metropolitan Area in Keraniganj Upazila, which is an industrial suburb.

== Port infrastructure ==
The port has a storage capacity of 3,500 TEU in its 55,000-square-meter container yard, and handles 116,000 TEU annually. The port has a 180-meter-long and 26-meter-wide jetty which can handle two ships of 70 to 75 meters at berth simultaneously. As of 2017, the terminal has one mobile harbor crane, two straddle carriers, four forklifts, two tractor trailers, and two cargo-lifting cranes.

== Shipping routes ==
When the port was opened, the chief shipping route was between Dhaka and Chittagong port. In February 2017, the first Indian ship from Kolkata docked at the port. In July 2017, China and Bangladesh signed an agreement to allow vessels to travel to the port. Coastal shipping agreements allow foreign vessels to directly carry cargo to Bangladeshi ports, instead of using Singapore or Colombo for transshipment.

== See also ==
- Countries dependent on the Bay of Bengal
