= Port of Narayanganj =

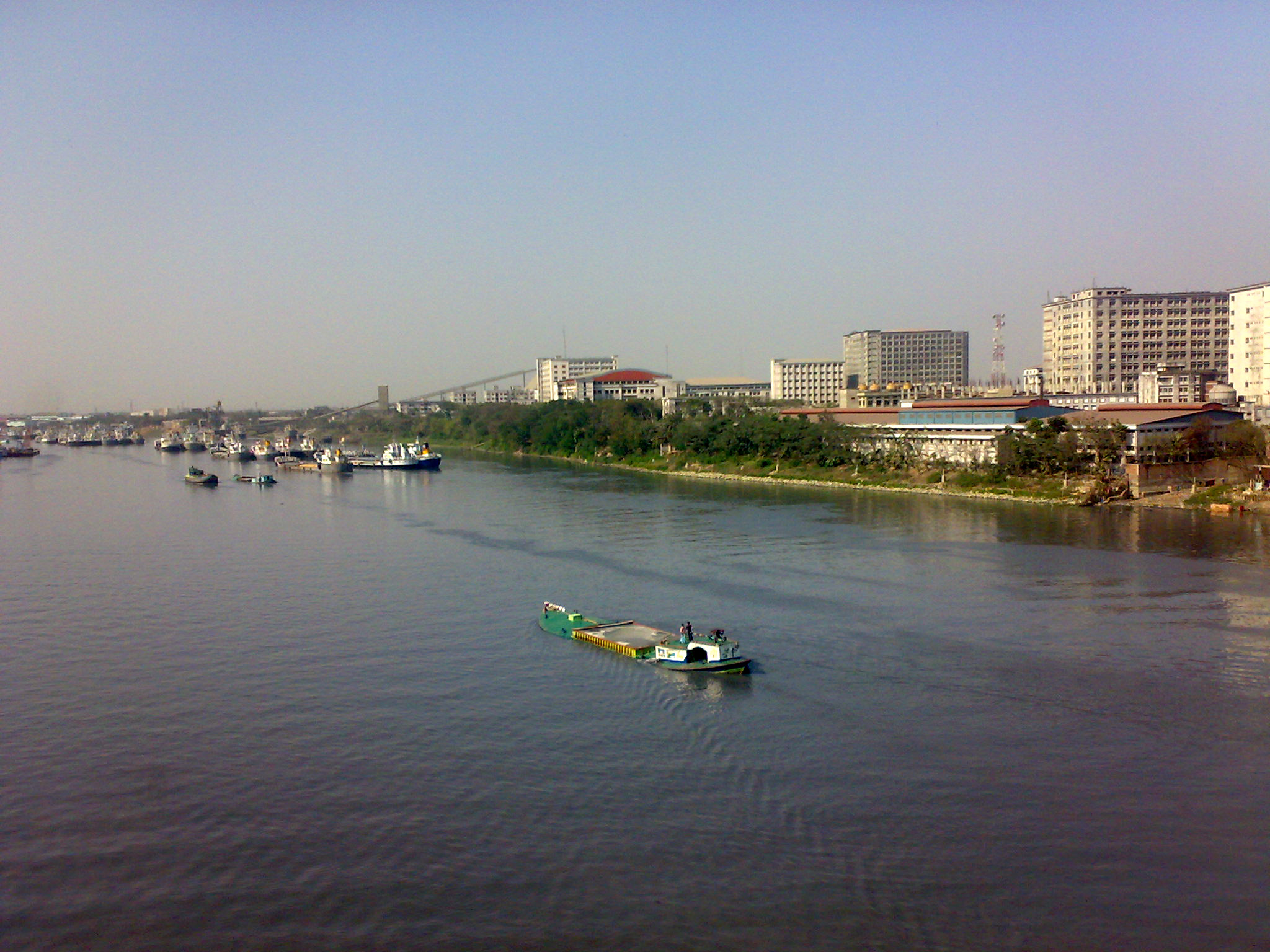
- Ships on the Shitalakshya River beside the Kanchpur Industrial Area in Narayanganj
- Click on the map for a fullscreen view

Location
- Country: Bangladesh
- Location: Narayanganj District, Dhaka Division
- Coordinates: 23.617°N 90.506°E
- UN/LOCODE: BGNAR

Details
- Opened: 1862
- Operated by: Bangladesh Inland Water Transport Authority
- Owned by: Government of Bangladesh
- Type of harbour: Artificial / Natural
- No. of wharfs: 17

The Port of Narayanganj is a river port in Narayanganj, Bangladesh. It is one of the oldest and busiest river ports in Bangladesh; and one of the major ports of the Bengal delta. The port is located on the Shitalakshya River. The port area is home to numerous industries.

== History ==
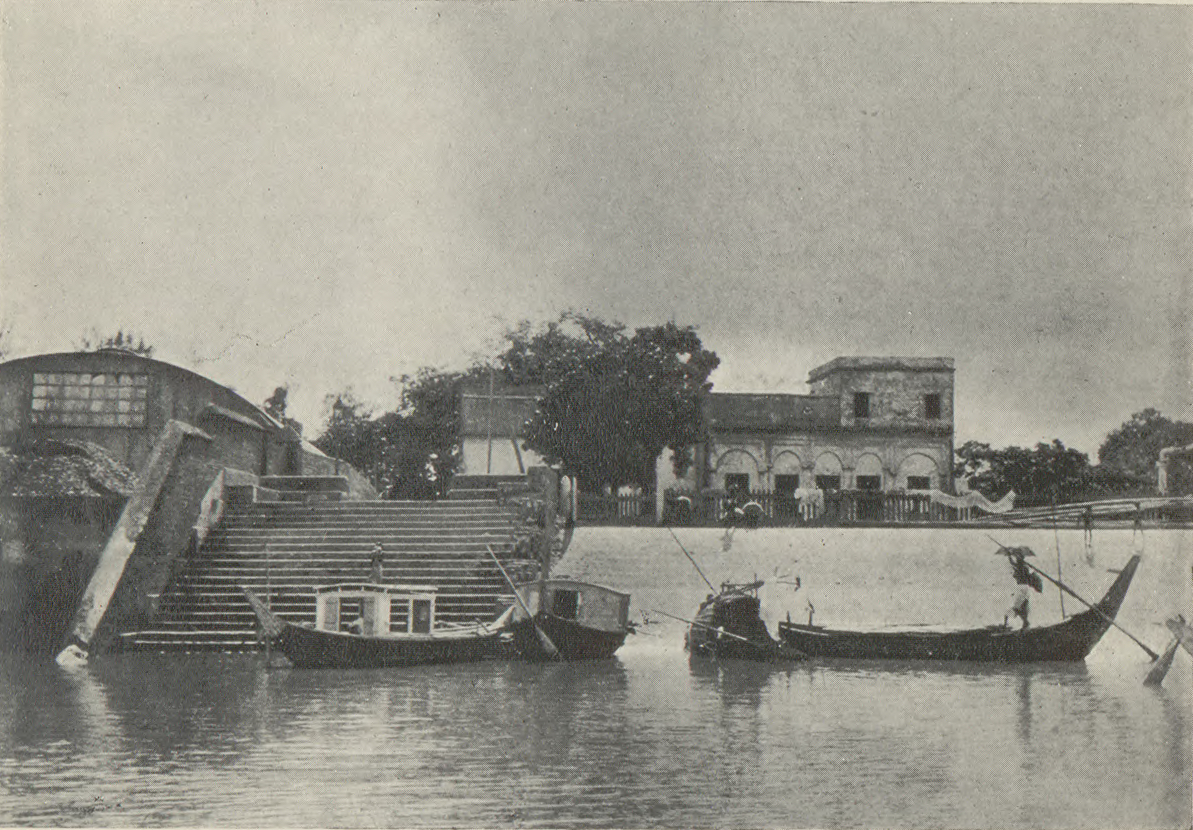
Narayanganj Port in 1906

The port formally began operations in 1862. Narayanganj was the principal gateway to Dacca during British rule. The port had shipping links with the major ports of Bengal, Assam and Burma, including Dacca, Calcutta, Chittagong, Akyab, Rangoon, Cachar and Sylhet. It became a center of trade in jute, timber, salt, textiles, oil, cotton, tobacco, pottery, seeds and betel nut. The British government declared it as a "Tax Free Port" in 1879.

Rally Brothers & Co. was the first company to begin the jute business in the port of Narayanganj. Numerous British companies set up trading posts in the area and used middlemen, called beparis, to source raw jute from the hinterland. A chamber of commerce was set up in 1904. In 1907–08, 20 companies were engaged in the jute trade of Narayanganj, of which 18 were European. Hindu merchants opened several cotton mills in the 1920s, including the Dhakeshwari Cotton Mill, the Chittaranjan Cotton Mill and the Laxmi Narayan Cotton Mill. In 1950, the Adamjee Jute Mills, the world's largest jute mill, was established near the port. The government of Pakistan developed the modern port in June 1955. In the 1960s, Queen Elizabeth II, Crown Prince Akihito and King Bhumibol were among the foreign dignitaries who visited the Narayanganj port and Adamjee Jute Mills. Kamal Hossain served as a lawyer for the English-owned and Narayanganj-based Rally Brothers company.

The present-day Metropolitan Chamber of Commerce and Industry (MCCI) in Bangladesh has its roots in the Narayanganj Chamber of Commerce (NCC) established in 1904.

== Port facilities ==
The port has a two-storied terminal building, seven RCC jetties, ten pontoon jetties and a number of warehouses covering a total floor space of 62,000 sq ft. The port is linked with Dhaka by the Bangladesh Railway and three roads.

== Industry ==
The port's surroundings are a vital manufacturing center of Bangladesh, including for the Bangladesh textile industry, shipbuilding, food processing, chemicals, pulp and paper, machinery and metal products, chemicals, wood products, consumer goods and construction materials.

== See also ==
- Countries dependent on the Bay of Bengal
