= BIMSTEC =

International cooperation organisation

Bay of Bengal Initiative for Multi-Sectoral Technical and Economic Cooperation
(in other languages)
- - Bengali: বঙ্গোপসাগরীয় বহুখাতীয় কারিগরি ও অর্থনৈতিক সহযোগিতা উদ্যোগ
  - Burmese: ဘင်္ဂလားပင်လယ်အော်ဒေသတွင်း ကဏ္ဍပေါင်းစုံ၊ နည်းပညာနှင့် စီးပွားရေးပူးပေါင်းဆောင်ရွက်မှု အစီအစဉ်
  - Dzongkha: བེང་གཱལ་མཚོ་ཁའི་སྡེ་ཚན་སྣ་མང་གི་འཕྲུལ་རིག་དང་དཔལ་འབྱོར་མཉམ་ལས་ལས་འགུལ།
  - Hindi: बंगाल की खाड़ी बहुक्षेत्रीय तकनीकी एवं आर्थिक सहयोग पहल
  - Nepali: बङ्गालको खाडी बहुक्षेत्रीय प्राविधिक तथा आर्थिक सहयोग पहल
  - Sinhala: බෙංගාල බොක්ක ආශ්‍රිත රටවල බහු ආංශික තාක්ෂණික ආර්ථික සහයෝගීතාව සඳහා වන එකමුතුව
  - Tamil: வங்காள விரிகுடா பல்துறை தொழில்நுட்ப பொருளாதார கூட்டுறவிற்கான முன்னெடுப்பு
  - Thai: ความริเริ่มแห่งอ่าวเบงกอลสำหรับความร่วมมือหลากหลายสาขาทางวิชาการและเศรษฐกิจ
BIMSTEC
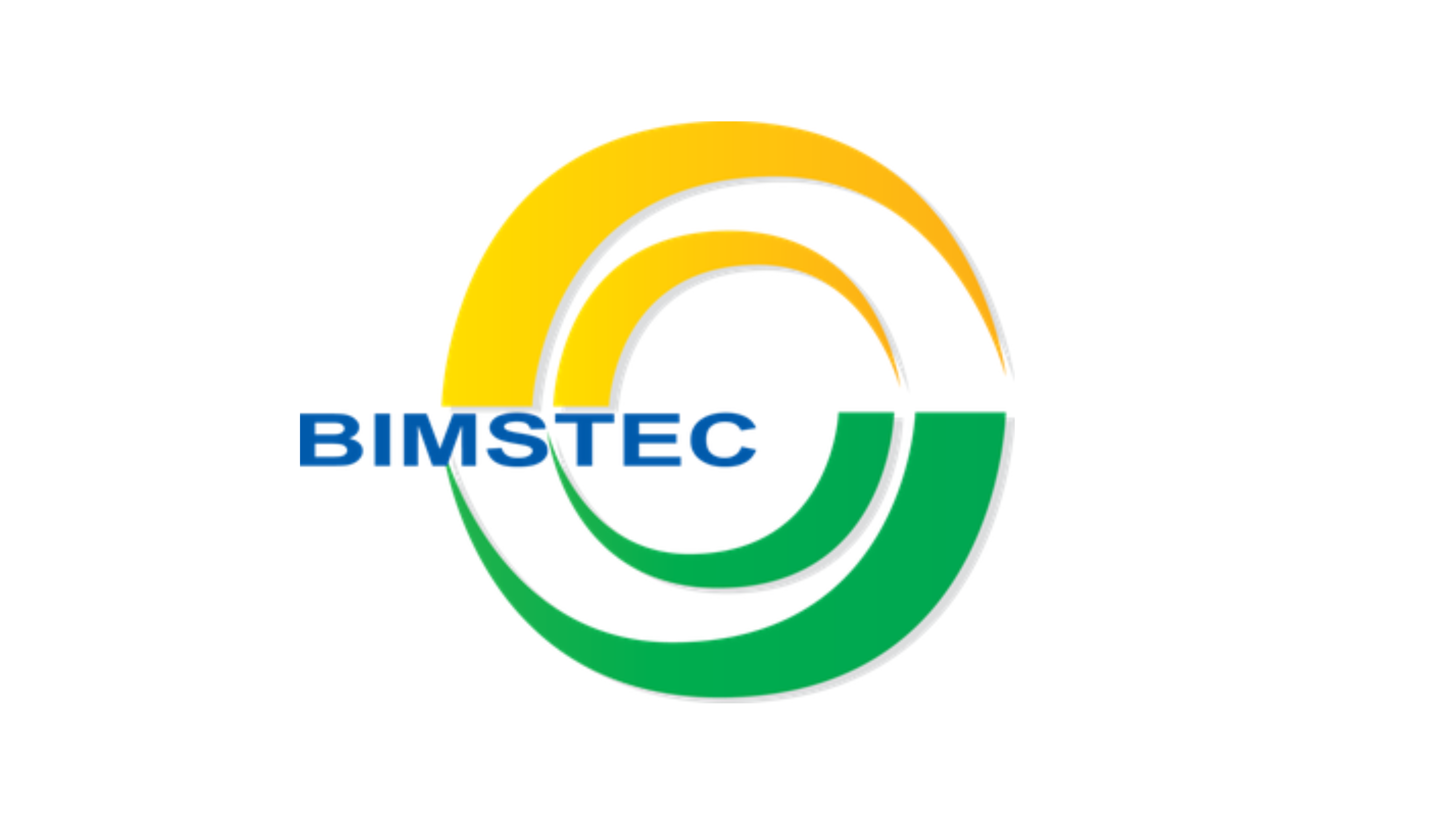
- Flag Emblem

- Location of BIMSTEC in Asia
- Headquarters: Dhaka, Bangladesh; 23°45′50″N 90°23′20″E
- Largest city: Mumbai, India; 19°04′34″N 72°52′39″E
- Working language: English
- Official languages of contracting states: Bengali; Burmese; Dzongkha; English; Hindi; Nepali; Sinhalese; Tamil; Thai
- Type: Regional organisation
- Membership: 7 countries: Bangladesh; Bhutan; India; Myanmar; Nepal; Sri Lanka; Thailand

Leaders
  - Chairmanship: Bangladesh (since March 2025)
  - Secretary General: India (since 2023)
- Establishment: 6 June 1997; 29 years ago

Area
  - Total: 4,876,941 km^{2} (1,882,997 sq mi)

Population
  - 2025 estimate: 1.777 billion
  - Density: 364.4/km^{2} (943.8/sq mi)
- Time zone: UTC+5:30 to +7:00
- Website bimstec.org

The Bay of Bengal Initiative for Multi-Sectoral Technical and Economic Cooperation (BIMSTEC) is an international organization of seven South Asian and Southeast Asian nations, housing 1.73 billion people and having a combined gross domestic product of US$5.2 trillion (2023). The BIMSTEC member states – Bangladesh, Bhutan, India, Myanmar, Nepal, Sri Lanka, and Thailand – are among the countries dependent on the Bay of Bengal.

Fourteen priority sectors of cooperation have been identified and several BIMSTEC centers have been established to focus on those sectors. As of 2018, BIMSTEC free trade agreement is under negotiation, considered similar to SAARC.

Leadership is rotated in alphabetical order of country names. The permanent secretariat is in Dhaka, Bangladesh.

== Background ==
On 6 June 1997, a new sub-regional grouping was formed in Bangkok under the name BIST-EC (Bangladesh, India, Sri Lanka, and Thailand Economic Cooperation). Following the inclusion of Myanmar on 22 December 1997 during a special Ministerial Meeting in Bangkok, the Group was renamed 'BIMST-EC' (Bangladesh, India, Myanmar, Sri Lanka and Thailand Economic Cooperation). In 1998, Nepal became an observer. In February 2004, Nepal and Bhutan became full members.

At the first summit, held on 31 July 2004, the group was renamed BIMSTEC—the Bay of Bengal Initiative for Multi-Sectoral Technical and Economic Cooperation.

== Objective ==
There are 14 main sectors of BIMSTEC along technological and economic cooperation among South Asian and Southeast Asian countries along the coast of the Bay of Bengal.

1. Trade & Investment
2. Transport & Communication
3. Energy
4. Tourism
5. Technology
6. Fisheries
7. Agriculture
8. Public Health
9. Poverty Alleviation
10. Counter-Terrorism & Transnational Crime
11. Environment & Disaster Management
12. People-to-People Contact
13. Cultural Cooperation
14. Climate Change

Sectors 7 to 13 were added at the 8th Ministerial Meeting in Dhaka in 2005 while the 14th sector was added in 11th Ministerial Meeting in New Delhi in 2008.

Member nations are denoted as Lead Countries for each sector.

- Provides cooperation to one another for the provision of training and research facilities in educational vocational and technical fields
- Promote active collaboration and mutual assistance in economic, social, technical and scientific fields of common interest
- Provides help to increase the socio-economic growth of the member countries

== Permanent Secretariat ==
The BIMSTEC Permanent Secretariat at Dhaka was opened in 2014 and India contributes 32% of its expenditure. The current Secretary General of the BIMSTEC is Ambassador Indra Mani Pandey from India.

No.	Date	Country	Secretary General of the BIMSTEC
1	2014–2017	Sri Lanka	Sumith Nakandala
2	2017–2020	Bangladesh	M Shahidul Islam
3	2020–2023	Bhutan	Tenzin Lekphell
4	2024–present	India	Indra Mani Pandey

== Chairmanship ==
The BIMSTEC uses the alphabetical order for the Chairmanship. The Chairmanship of the BIMSTEC has been taken in rotation commencing with

Bangladesh (1997–1999, 2005–2006, 2025–Present)

India (2000, 2006–2008)

Myanmar (2001–2002, 2009–2014)

Sri Lanka (2002–2003, 2018–2022)

Thailand (2004–2005, 2022–2024)

Nepal (2015–2018).

== Member nations ==
Notes
(*) = Chief executive

A clickable Euler diagram showing the relationships between various Asian regional organizations

Countries	Head of state	Head of government	Population	Nominal GDP / US$billion
Bangladesh	Mirza Fakhrul Islam Alamgir, President of Bangladesh	Tarique Rahman, Prime Minister of Bangladesh (*)	169,356,251	419.237
Bhutan	Jigme Khesar Namgyel Wangchuck, King of Bhutan	Tshering Tobgay, Prime Minister of Bhutan (*)	777,486	2.653
India	Droupadi Murmu, President of India	Narendra Modi, Prime Minister of India (*)	1,407,563,842	4,505.743
Myanmar	Min Aung Hlaing, President of Myanmar (*)		53,798,084	69.262
Nepal	Ram Chandra Poudel, President of Nepal	Balen Shah, Prime Minister of Nepal	31,122,378	41.393
Sri Lanka	Anura Kumara Dissanayake, President of Sri Lanka (*)	Harini Amarasuriya, Prime Minister of Sri Lanka	21,773,441	81.934
Thailand	Vajiralongkorn (Rama X), King of Thailand	Anutin Charnvirakul, Prime Minister of Thailand (*)	71,601,103	522.012

=== Heads of the member nations ===
Leaders are either heads of state or heads of government, depending on which is constitutionally the chief executive of the nation's government.

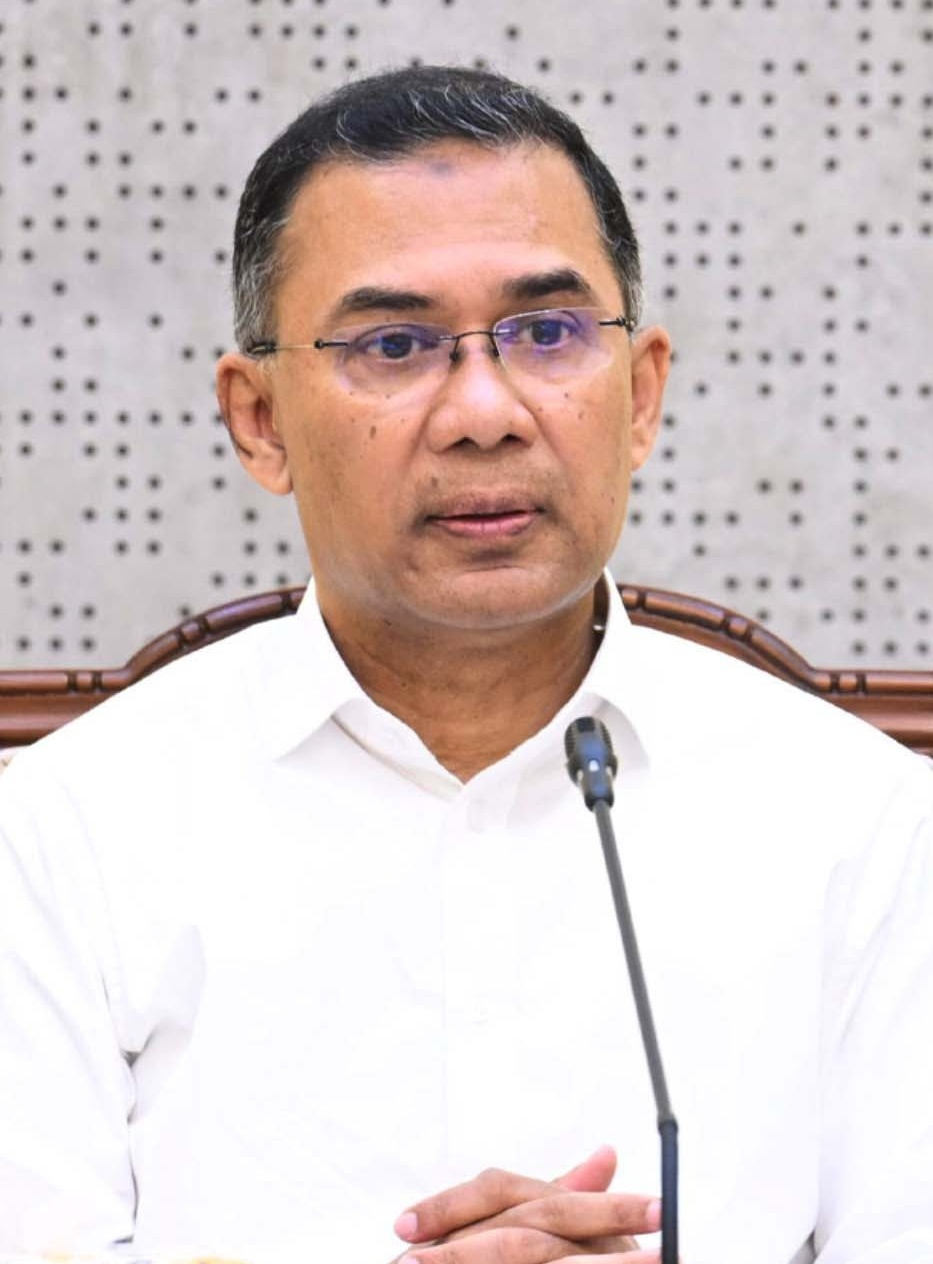
People's Republic of Bangladesh
Tarique Rahman
Prime Minister of Bangladesh

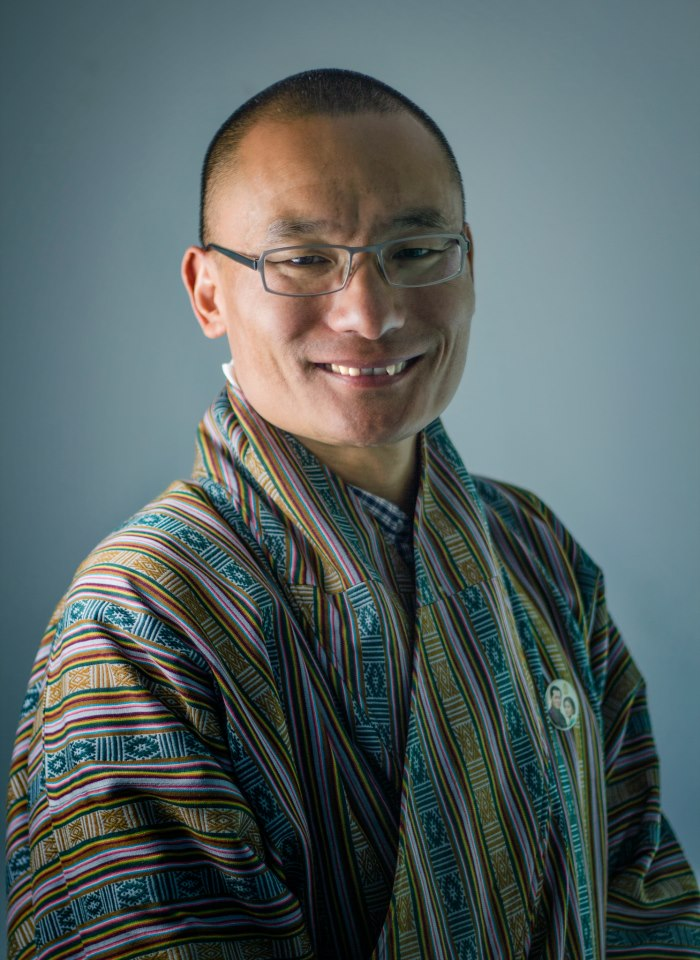
Kingdom of Bhutan
Tshering Tobgay
Prime Minister of Bhutan

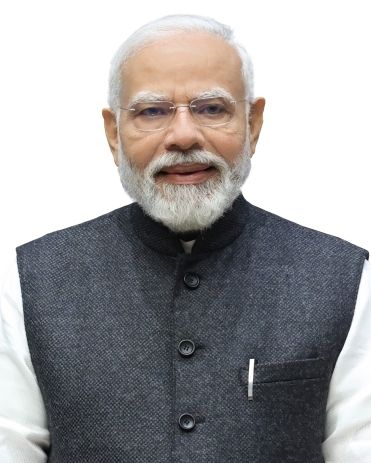
Republic of India
Narendra Modi
Prime Minister of India

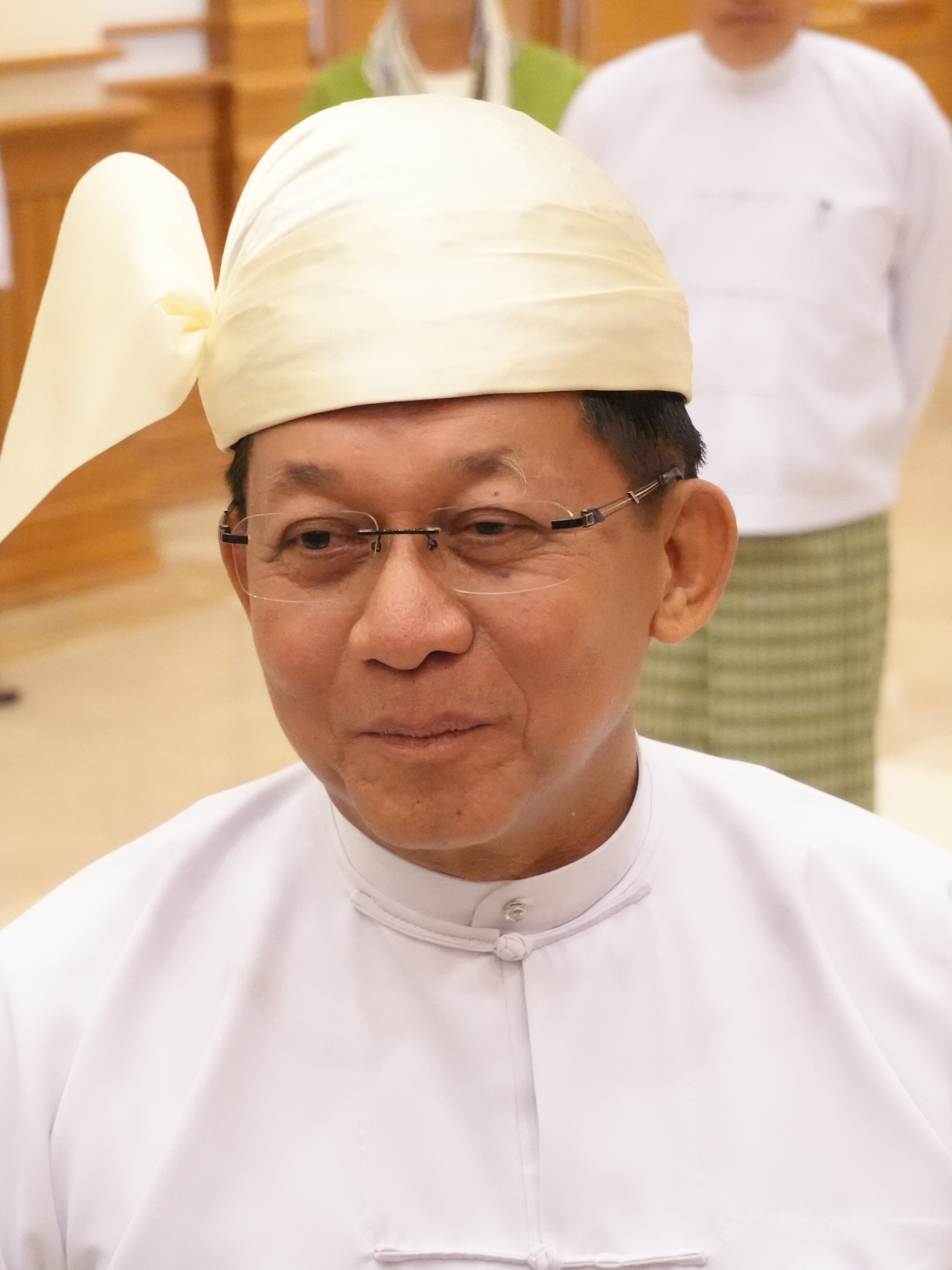
Republic of the Union of Myanmar Min Aung Hlaing President of Myanmar

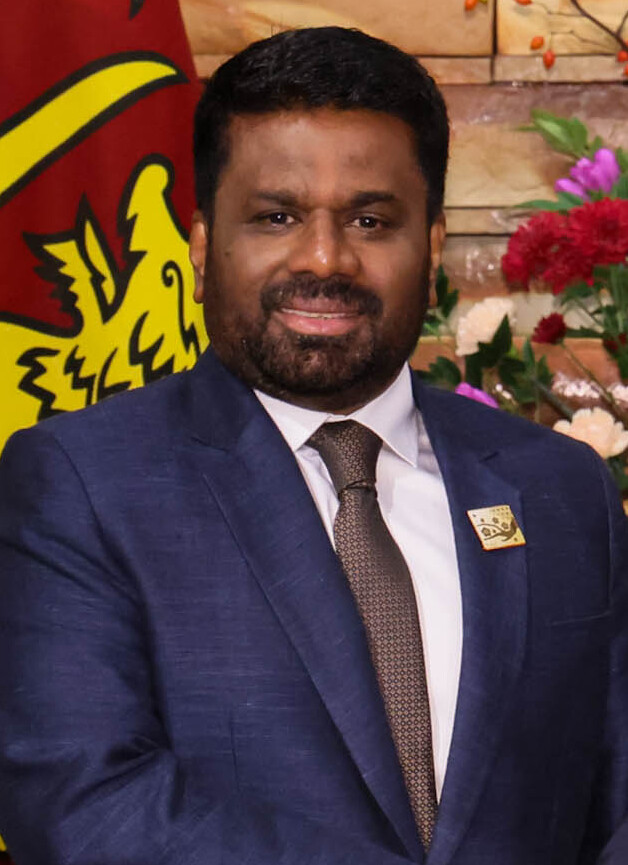
Democratic Socialist Republic of Sri Lanka
Anura Kumara Dissanayake
President of Sri Lanka

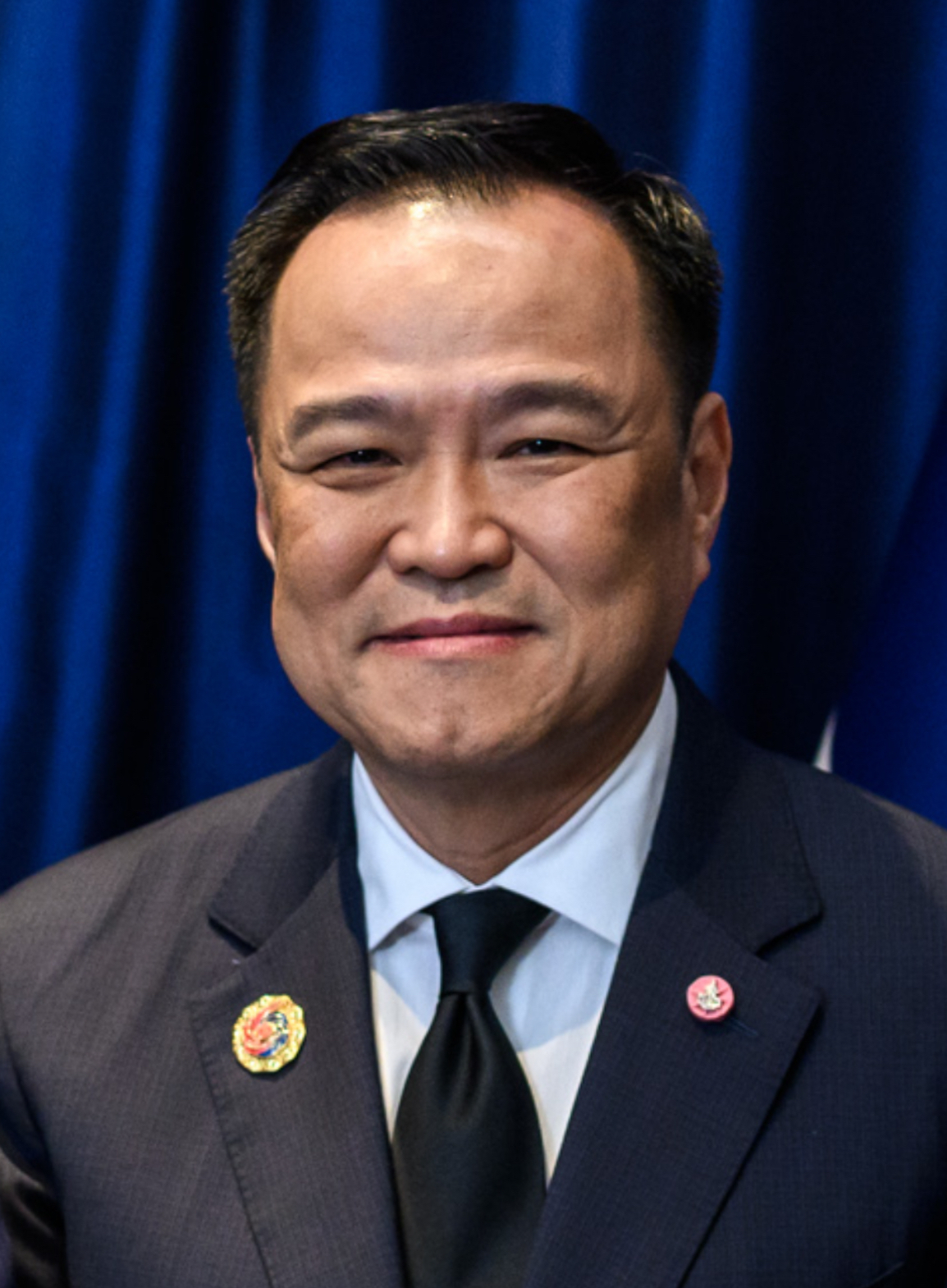
Kingdom of Thailand
Anutin Charnvirakul
Prime Minister of Thailand

== BIMSTEC priority sectors ==
14 priority areas have been identified with the lead nations appointed to lead the effort: The organisation has 15 priority areas for cooperation, including Trade & Investment, Transport & Communication, Energy, Tourism, Technology, Fisheries, Agriculture, Public Health, Poverty Alleviation, Counter-Terrorism & Transnational Crime, Environment & Disaster Management, People-to-People Contact, Cultural Cooperation, Climate Change and Blue Economy.

Priority Area	Lead Country	Centre	Comments
Transport and communication	India		
Tourism	India	BIMSTEC Tourism Information Centre, Delhi	
Counterterrorism and transnational crime	India		Four subgroups: Intelligence sharing – Sri Lanka (lead), Terror financing – Thailand, Legal – Myanmar, Law enforcement and narcotics – Myanmar
Environment and disaster management	India	BIMSTEC Weather and Climate Centre, Noida	
Energy	Myanmar	BIMSTEC Energy Centre, Bengaluru	BIMSTEC Grid Interconnection MoU signed in 2014
Public Health	Thailand	BIMSTEC Network of National Centres on Coordination in Traditional Medicine	
Agriculture	Myanmar		
Trade & Investment	Bangladesh		
Technology	Sri Lanka		
Fisheries	Thailand		
People-to-People Contact	Thailand		
Poverty Alleviation	Nepal		
Climate Change	Bangladesh		
Cultural Cooperation	Bhutan		1200 ITEC scholarships by India

In a virtual BIMSTEC Colombo summit which took place on 30 March 2022, decision was taken to reduce, re-constitute and reconstruct the number of sectors of co-operation from the unwieldy 14 to a more manageable 7.

1. Trade, Investment and Development - Bangladesh
2. Environment and Climate Change - Bhutan
3. Security and Energy - India
4. Agriculture and Food Security - Myanmar
5. People-to-people Contact - Nepal
6. Science, Technology and Innovation - Sri Lanka
7. Connectivity - Thailand

== BIMSTEC Free Trade Area Framework Agreement ==
The BIMSTEC Free Trade Area Framework Agreement (BFTAFA) has been signed by all member nations to stimulate trade and investment in the parties, and attract outsiders to trade with and invest in the BIMSTEC countries at a higher level. Subsequently, the "Trade Negotiating Committee" (TNC) was set up, with Thailand as the permanent chair, to negotiate in areas of trade in goods and services, investment, economic co-operation, trade facilitations and technical assistance n. for LDCs. Once negotiation on trade in goods is completed, the TNC would then proceed with negotiation on trade in services and investment.

The BIMSTEC Coastal Shipping Agreement draft was discussed on 1 December 2017 in New Delhi, to facilitate coastal shipping within 20 nautical miles of the coastline in the region to boost trade between the member countries. Compared to the deep sea shipping, coastal ship require smaller vessels with lesser draft and involve lower costs. Once the agreement becomes operational after it is ratified, a lot of cargo movement between the member countries can be done through the cost effective, environment friendly and faster coastal shipping routes. The necessity for coastal shipping ecosystem and electricity grid interconnectivity, as two of the necessary components of the evolving shape of BIMSTEC.

On 7 and 8 November 2019, the first ever BIMSTEC Conclave of Ports summit was held in Visakhapatnam, India. The main aims of this summit is providing a platform to strengthen maritime interaction, port-led connectivity initiatives and sharing best practices among member countries.

In 2022 summit saw the declaration of the Master Plan for Transport Connectivity that would provide a framework for regional and domestic connectivity,

== Cooperation with Asian Development Bank (ADB) ==
The Asian Development Bank (ADB) becomes a partner in 2005, to undertake the "BIMSTEC Transport Infrastructure and Logistic Study" (BTILS), which was completed in 2014.

== BIMSTEC Summits ==
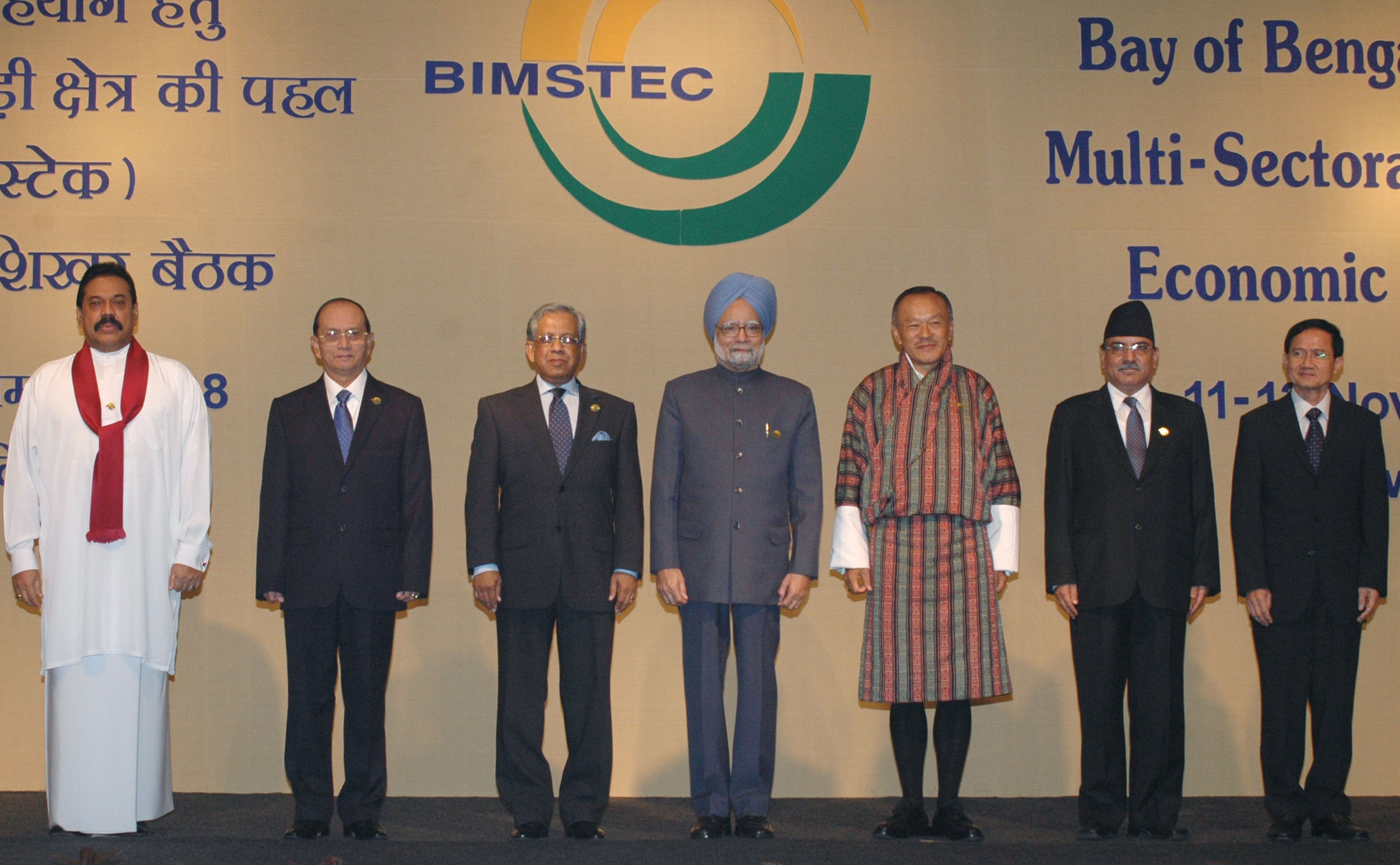
Second Summit at New Delhi, India

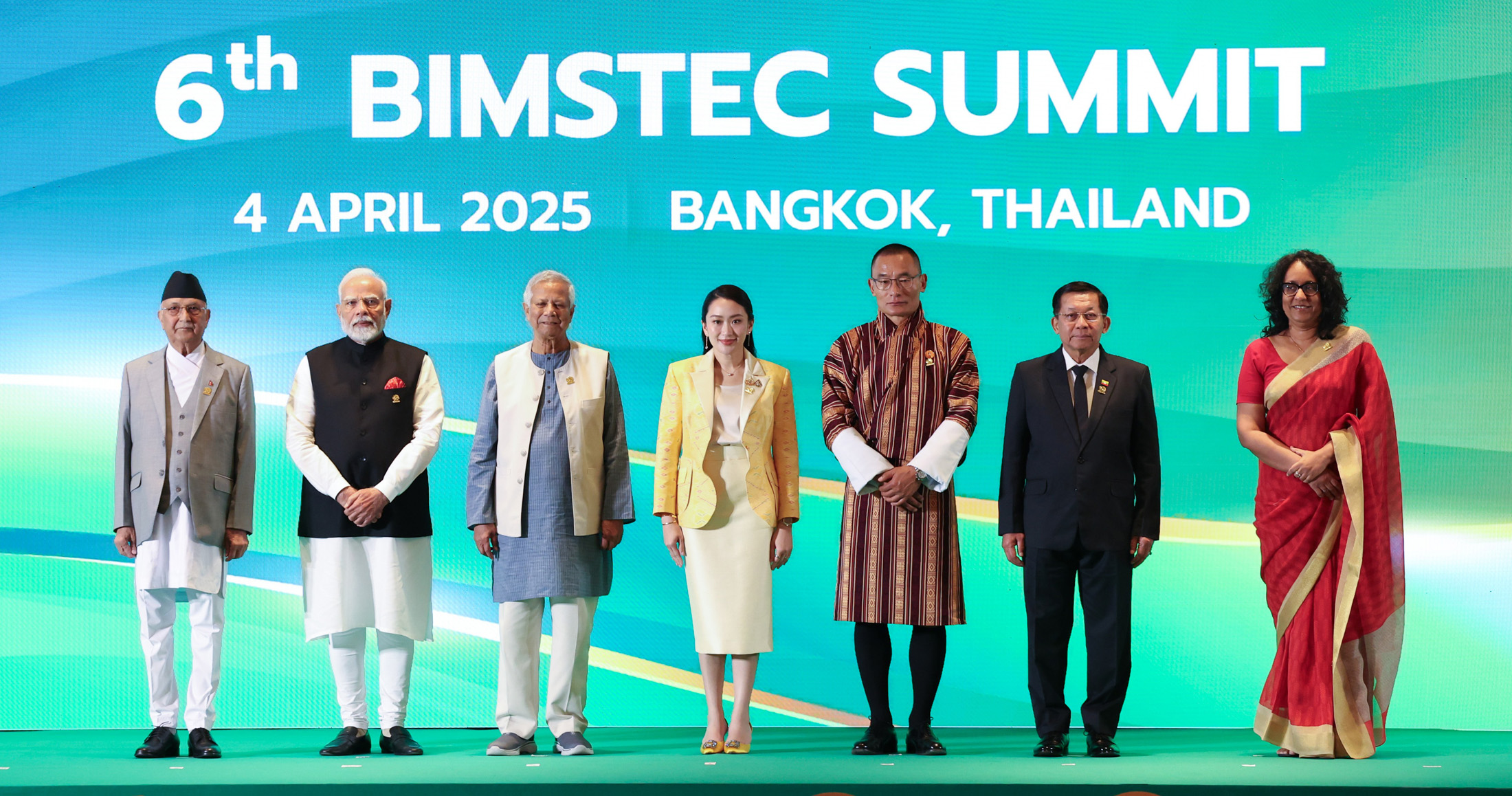
Sixth Summit at Bangkok, Thailand

No.	Date	Host country	Host city
1st	31 July 2004	Thailand	Bangkok
2nd	13 November 2008	India	New Delhi
3rd	4 March 2014	Myanmar	Naypyidaw
4th	30–31 August 2018	Nepal	Kathmandu
5th	30 March 2022	Sri Lanka	Colombo (Virtual meeting)
6th	2–4 April 2025	Thailand	Bangkok
7th	TBD	Bangladesh	Dhaka (Presumptive)

== Projects ==
- Coast shipping
- Power grid interconnection
- Regional disaster monitoring and warning system
- Road and rail Look-East connectivity projects
- MILEX-18:The first-ever BIMSTEC Multinational Military Field Training Exercise (MILEX-18) was held in Pune, India from 10–16 September 2018. The exercise was attended by all seven BIMSTEC member countries: Bangladesh, Bhutan, India, Myanmar, Nepal, Sri Lanka, and Thailand.

The theme of the exercise was counter-terrorism in semi-urban terrain. The participating troops conducted a series of exercises, including search-and-cordon operations, search and destroy, and handling and neutralisation of improvised explosive devices (IEDs). They also participated in a validation exercise on the final day of the exercise.

The MILEX-18 was a major success and was hailed as a significant step towards increased military cooperation in the Bay of Bengal region. The exercise helped to improve interoperability between the participating forces and to share best practices in the field of counter-terrorism. It also helped to build trust and confidence among the BIMSTEC member countries.

The MILEX-18 was a major boost to the BIMSTEC security cooperation agenda. It is expected to pave the way for more such exercises in the future, which will help to further enhance the security cooperation between the BIMSTEC member countries.

In addition to the military exercises, the MILEX-18 also included a number of other activities, such as an Army Chiefs' Conclave and a seminar on counter-terrorism. The Army Chiefs' Conclave was an opportunity for the participating countries to discuss and share their views on regional security issues. The seminar on counter-terrorism provided a forum for the participants to learn about the latest trends in terrorism and to discuss ways to counter it.

The MILEX-18 was a landmark event in the history of BIMSTEC. It was a major step towards increased military cooperation in the Bay of Bengal region and it is expected to have a positive impact on regional security.

The following are some of the key outcomes of the MILEX-18:

MILEX-18 brought several important outcomes for BIMSTEC member countries. The exercise helped improve coordination and interoperability between the participating forces while providing an opportunity to share practices and experiences in counter-terrorism. It also helped build trust and confidence among the member countries, strengthening their commitment to regional security cooperation. Furthermore, the exercise laid the groundwork for similar military engagements in the future and gave further momentum to BIMSTEC's security cooperation agenda.

== See also ==
- BIMSTEC Games
- ASEAN
- Asia Cooperation Dialogue
- Asian Clearing Union
- Asian Development Bank
- Bangladesh Bhutan India Nepal Initiative (BBIN)
- India's International connectivity projects
- Mekong-Ganga Cooperation
- South Asian Association for Regional Cooperation (SAARC)
- South Asia Subregional Economic Cooperation
