= Port of Dhaka =

Port of Dhaka ঢাকা সদরঘাট
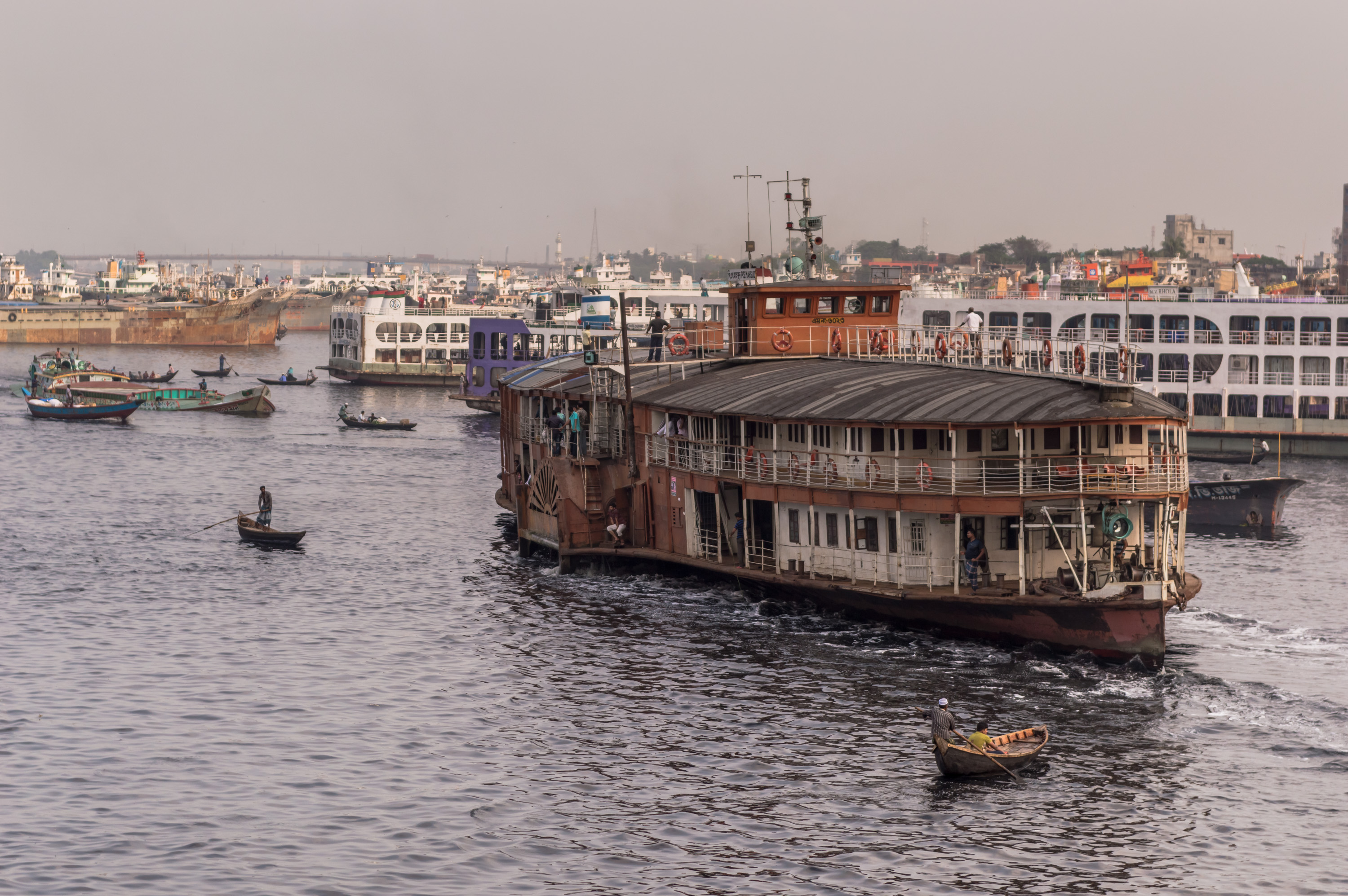
- Paddle steamer PS Mahsud (1928) on the Buriganga
- Interactive map of Port of Dhaka ঢাকা সদরঘাট
- Location in Bangladesh

Location
- Country: Bangladesh
- Location: Dhaka Metropolitan Area
- Coordinates: 23°42′N 90°25′E
- UN/LOCODE: BDDAC

Details
- Opened: 17th century
- Owned by: Bangladesh Inland Water Transport Authority
- Type of harbour: River port

The Port of Dhaka is a major river port on the Buriganga River in Dhaka, the capital and largest city of Bangladesh. The port is located in the southern part of the city. It is Bangladesh's busiest port in terms of passenger traffic. The port has services to most of the districts of Bangladesh. In 2013, a container terminal opened 20 kilometres (12 mi) from the city to handle ocean-going ships. Along with Barisal, Chandpur and Narayanganj, the Dhaka port handled 53 million tonnes of cargo and 22 million passengers in 2013–14.

== History ==
The Dhaka river port has a recorded existence since the Mughal Empire. The Mughal viceroy's fortress was built by the port in the 17th century. Dhaka's strategic riverine location in Bengal made it a hub for Eurasian traders, including the Portuguese, French, Dutch, British and Armenians. The city's riverbanks were dotted with mansions, bazaars and warehouses. The bustling old city was known as the Venice of the East. It was used for exports of cotton muslin, silk, jute, rice and other goods. During British rule, the riverfront hosted the offices of the Magistrate and Collector, and became the center of the colonial city. Bengali aristocrats built numerous palaces and mansions on the riverfront, including Ahsan Manzil and Ruplal House. The British developed ghats (wharfs), such as Wiseghat, Sadarghat and Northbrook Hall ghat. Paddle steamers were a common sight. The Viceroy of India often traveled by ship from Calcutta to Dhaka's riverside palaces for balls and parties.

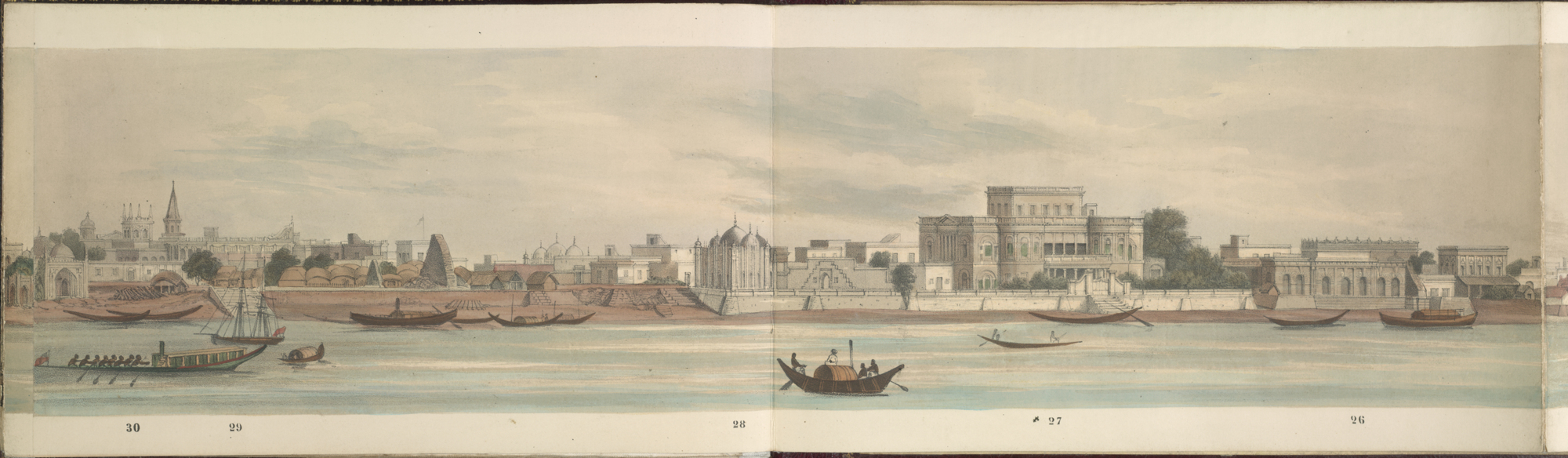
Panorama of the Dacca waterfront in the 19th century

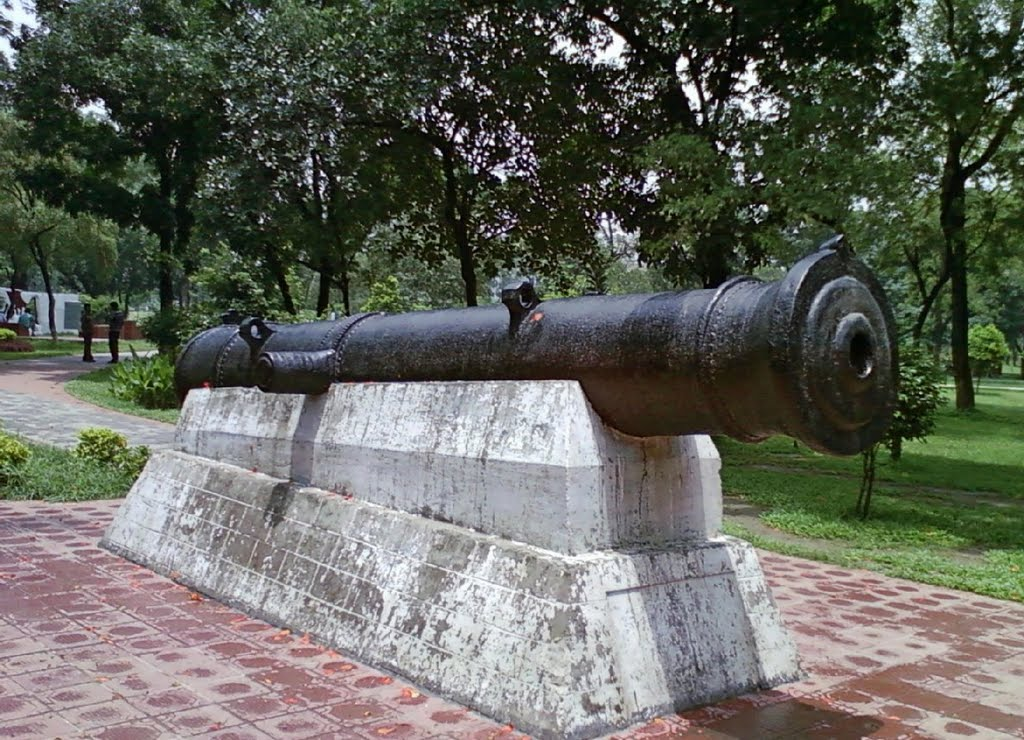
The Bibi Mariam Cannon was used to defend the city's waterfront

=== Buckland Bund ===
The Buckland Bund was an embankment constructed in 1864 under a scheme undertaken by the City Commissioner C. T. Buckland to protect Dhaka from flooding and river erosion, prevent formation of mud-flats along the bank and facilitate movement of passengers and cargo at the river ghat (wharf). The scheme, designed to be implemented by public subscription, also included construction of a promenade behind the bund to beautify the waterfront. Among the first to donate funds for the project were Nawab Khwaja Abdul Ghani and the Zamindar of Bhawal, Kalinarayan Roy. Despite considerable success in collecting subscriptions from the wealthy people of Dhaka, the funds generated proved insufficient for the project. Buckland then persuaded the government to provide support. Initially, the embankment on the riverfront from near the northbrook hall Ghat to Wiseghat was undertaken with provision for extensions eastward and westward upon availability of more funds.

The embankment was fortified with stone, and the top laid with bricks. Near Sadarghat, part of the strand was left green, and was later turned into a miniature park with a raised dais where visiting dignitaries could be received on landing from steamers and where a local regimental band played daily in the afternoon for the entertainment of the people. The strand became an attraction to the city and a boon and was used as a promenade overlooking the river with its busy traffic, where people could stroll in the afternoon and evening while enjoying the cool breeze from the river. In the 1870s, Nawab Abdul Ghani undertook its extension westward from Wiseghat and in the 1880s, Babu Ruplal Das and Raghunath Das extended it eastward from near Northbrook Hall.

The embankment eventually extended to about 1.5 kilometres in length and was later handed over to the municipality for maintenance.

== Sadarghat ==
The Sadarghat (lit. 'City Wharf') stands a little left in front of the Ahsan Manzil. Sadarghat is also the central point of the Buckland Bund. Originally, it was built as a place for docking of boats, launches and even ships coming to Dhaka. Large vessels can no longer use it because of shoaling up of the river bed entry and an overall downsizing of the capacity of the inland waterways.

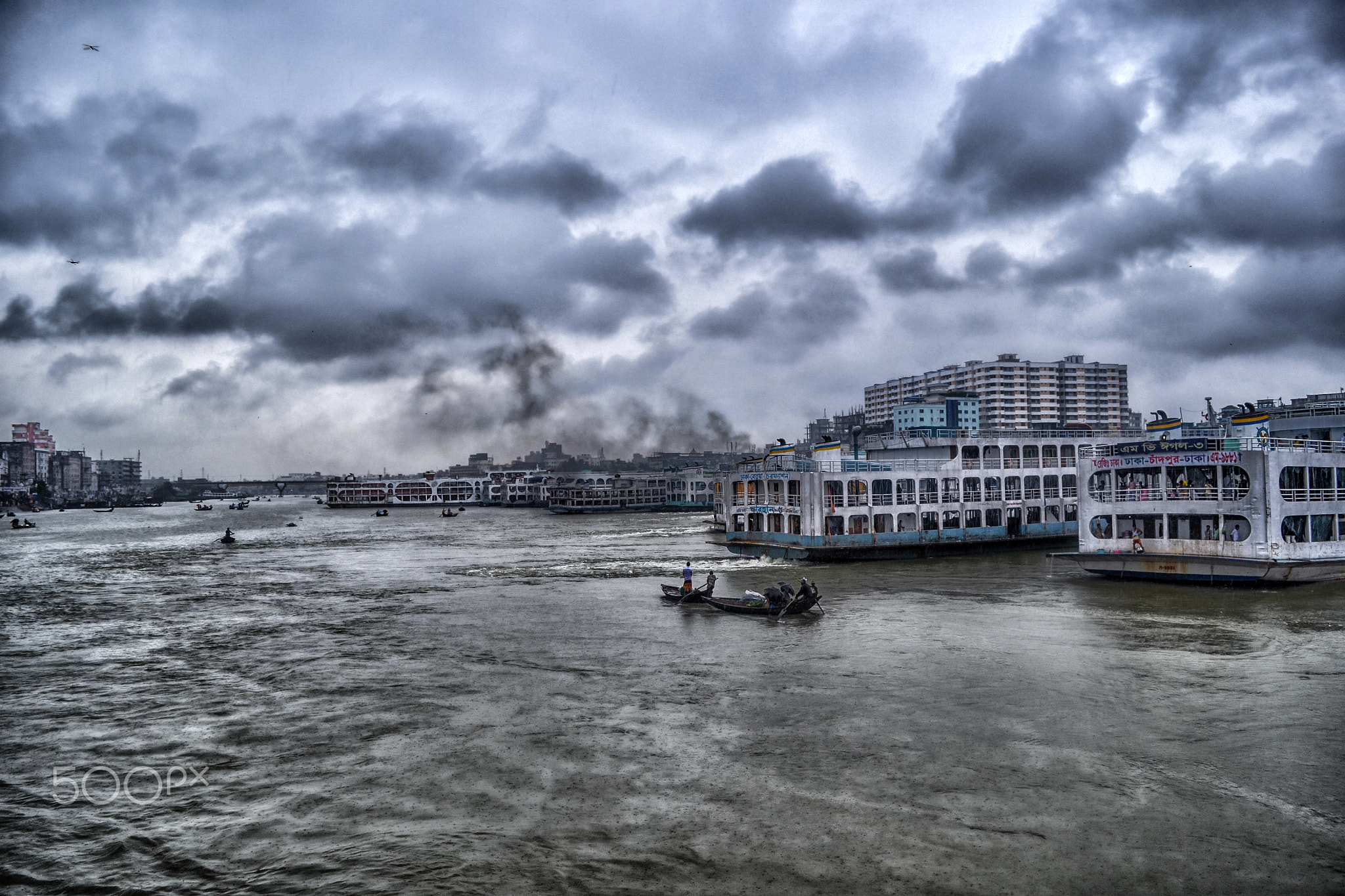
Sadarghat, Dhaka

Hundreds of boats and launches arrive at and depart from Sadarghat facilitating communication mostly with the southern districts. Barges carrying cargoes also use Sadarghat as a point of landing and departure. Sadarghat also has a floating market for fruits and vegetables. The Sadarghat has a busy terminal for steamers that carry passengers to districts and regional cities such as Khulna. Many parts of Dhaka city are connected with Sadarghat by a road parallel to the river. On either side of the road are many wholesale shops. along with the Portuguese fort.

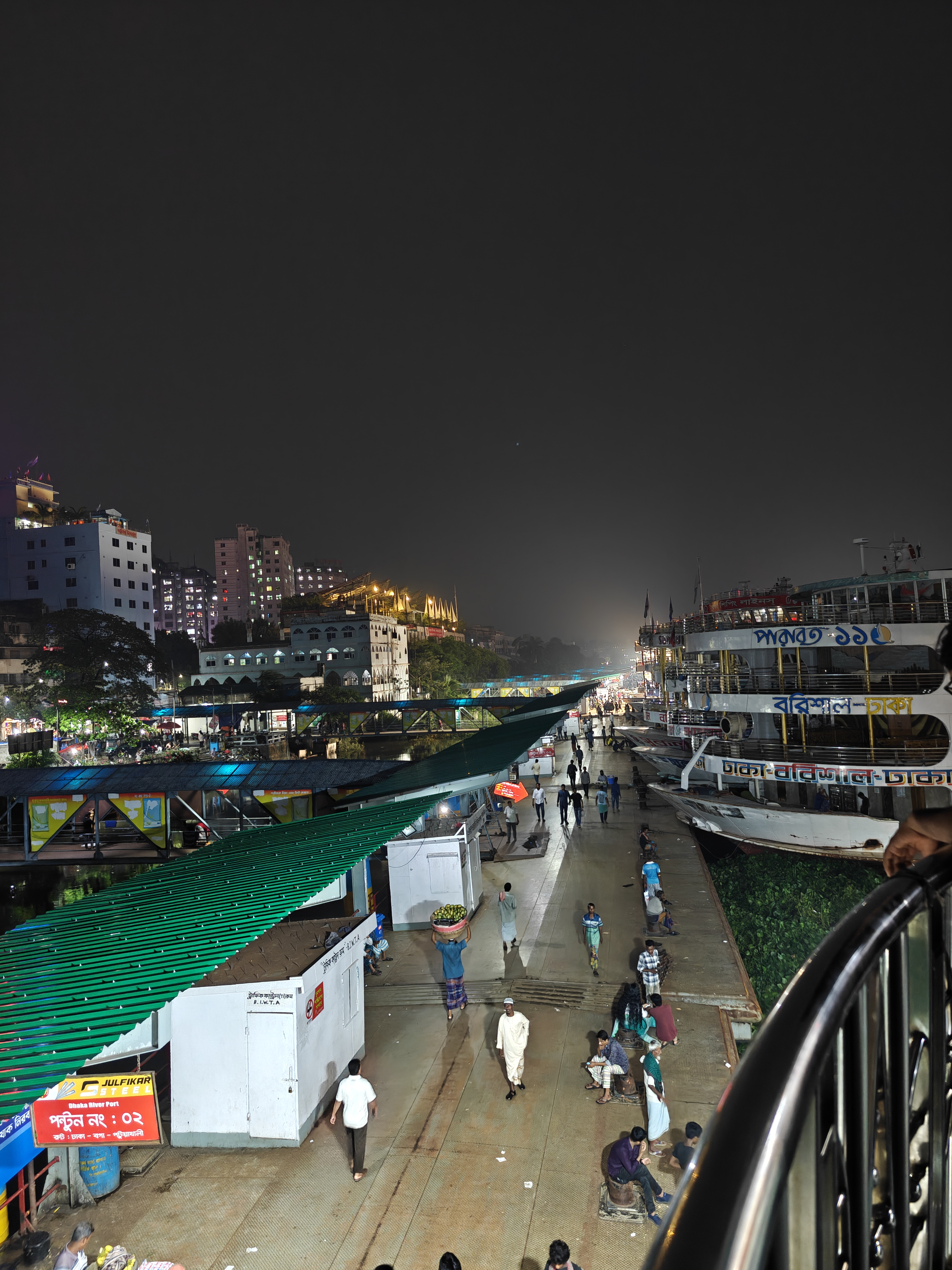
Sadarghat Launch Terminal in Night

== Pangaon ==
The Port of Pangaon is an inland container terminal with an annual capacity to handle 116,000 twenty-foot equivalent units of cargo. It serves as a cargo port for the Dhaka Metropolitan Area. As of July 2017, it serves ships traveling between Dhaka and Chittagong, Dhaka and Mongla and Dhaka and Kolkata. Bangladesh has signed coastal shipping agreements with Thailand and China, which are planned to cover the Pangaon terminal.

== River pollution ==
The contemporary polluted water of the Buriganga River has been a major challenge for Dhaka's health and hygiene. Once the lifeline of the Bangladeshi capital, the river is now one of the most polluted rivers in Bangladesh due to rampant dumping of industrial and human waste. However, water quality saw an improvement in 2016–17, after the government compelled tanneries along the river to relocate to other areas.

== See also ==
- Port of Chittagong
