= Tenzin Lekphell =

Bhutanese politician

Tenzin Lekphell is a military officer and founder of Druk Nyamrup Tshogpa, who served as 3rd Secretary-General of the International Organization BIMSTEC from 2020 to 2023. He was nominated for Secretary General by Government of Bhutan. He also served as National General Secretary of Druk Nyamrup Tshogpa.
