= Countries of the Bay of Bengal =

Overview of countries surrounding the Bay of Bengal

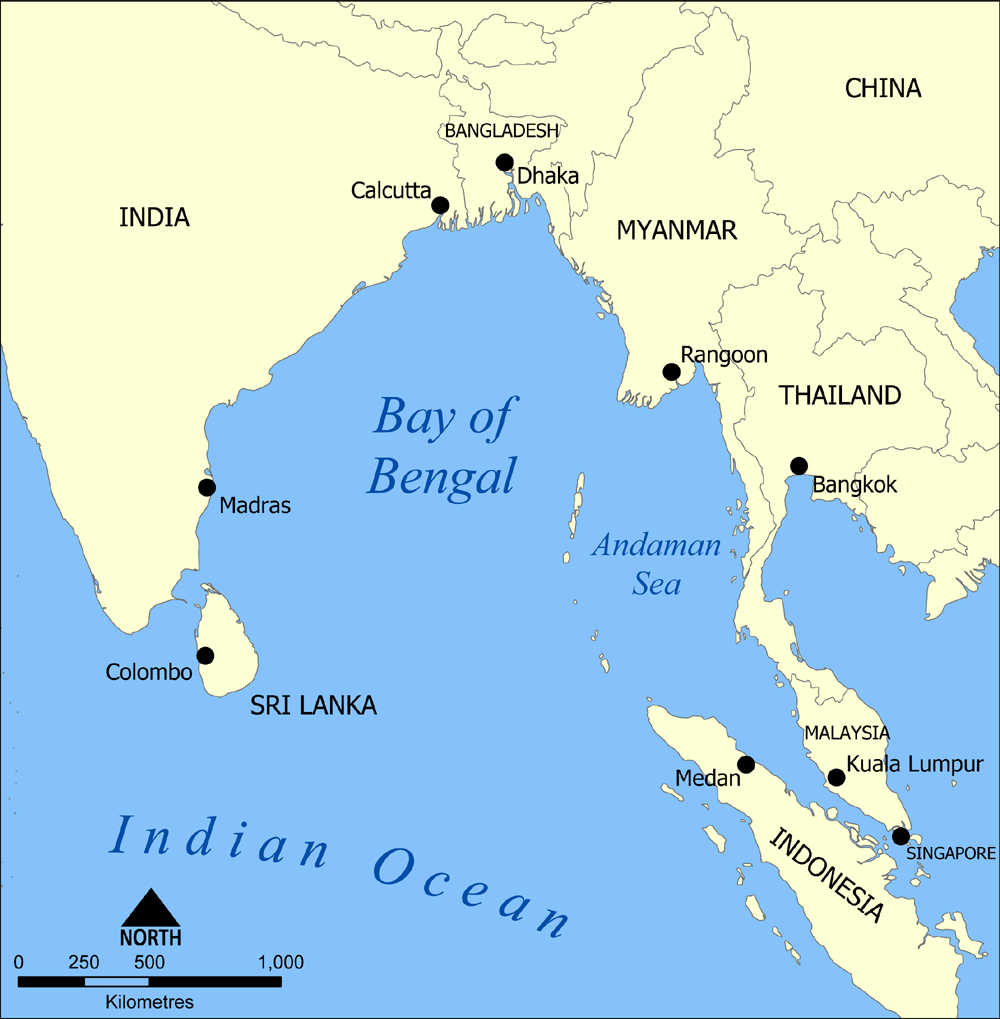
Map of the Bay of Bengal region

The countries of the Bay of Bengal include littoral and landlocked countries in South Asia and Southeast Asia that depend on the bay for maritime usage. Historically, the Bay of Bengal has been a highway of transport, trade, and cultural exchange between diverse peoples encompassing the Indian subcontinent, Indochinese Peninsula, and Malay Archipelago. Today, the Bay of Bengal region is the convergence of two major geopolitical blocs- the Association of Southeast Asian Nations (ASEAN) and the South Asian Association for Regional Cooperation (SAARC). The Bay of Bengal Initiative for Multisectoral Technical and Economic Cooperation (BIMSTEC) promotes regional engagement in the area.

The Bay of Bengal countries are often categorized into a maritime subregion. The bay hosts vital shipping routes linking its littoral and landlocked hinterland with the Indian Ocean. Its sea bed is being explored and exploited for hydrocarbon reserves.

== Littoral countries ==
- Bangladesh: The People's Republic of Bangladesh is the eighth-most populous country in the world. It is located at the northern apex of the Bay of Bengal, forming the largest and eastern part of the bay's historical namesake region, Bengal. It is hugely dependent on the bay for sources of nutrition (fish), shipping, energy, and employment. The Bangladeshi port of Chittagong is one of the busiest ports on the bay. The Bangladeshi capital Dhaka hosts the headquarters of BIMSTEC.
- India: The Indian states of West Bengal, Odisha, Andhra Pradesh, and Tamil Nadu have coastlines on the Bay of Bengal. India's eastern military command is based in the port city of Kolkata, the capital of erstwhile British India. Two of India's busiest ports Chennai and Vizag are also located on the bay. In addition to mainland India's coastline, the Indian Union territory of the Andaman and Nicobar Islands is located on the bay. The islands are largely reserved as a base for the Indian military.
- Indonesia: The northern tip of the Indonesian island of Sumatra, including the province of Aceh, forms the southeastern boundary of the Bay of Bengal.
- Myanmar: Formerly known as Burma, Myanmar's entire coastline is located on the Bay of Bengal. Its largest city and commercial capital Yangon is located in the littoral Irrawaddy delta on the bay. Myanmar's Rakhine State forms a large part of the country's coastline. Rakhine State's provincial capital is the port city of Sittwe.
- Sri Lanka: Dondra Head in southern Sri Lanka forms the southwestern boundary of the Bay of Bengal. The coastline includes Sri Lanka's Eastern, Northern, and Southern provinces. The Sri Lankan ports of Jaffna, Trincomalee, and Hambantota are located on the bay. Western Sri Lanka's Colombo port relies on the bay's transshipment traffic.
- Thailand: As a peripheral country, Thailand's western coastline is linked with the Bay of Bengal through the Andaman Sea, a marginal sea of the Indian Ocean.

== Landlocked countries ==
- Bhutan: The landlocked Himalayan kingdom of Bhutan is dependent on the Bay of Bengal as its sole maritime access route. Bhutan currently uses Indian and Bangladeshi seaports for maritime trade. Bhutan is dependent on the Indian port of Kolkata
- China: The Bay of Bengal's coastline with Myanmar has been described as China's "second coast". The Sino-Myanmar pipelines transport oil and natural gas from the deep-water port of Kyaukpyu to Yunnan Province. The Tibet Autonomous Region also forms part of the Bay of Bengal's landlocked hinterland.
- Nepal: The landlocked republic of Nepal forms part of the wider hinterland of the Bay of Bengal. Nepal has transit agreements with India and Bangladesh for the use of seaports.

== Other dependent countries ==
- Maldives: Although, the Maldives is not located in the Bay of Bengal, its fishing industry depends on the bay. Fishing is one of the chief employment sectors in the Maldives.
- Malaysia: Peninsular Malaysia is located near the Bay of Bengal. The Malaysian fishing and international trade sectors depend on the Bay of Bengal.
- Singapore: Singapore's economy relies significantly on container traffic from the littoral Bay of Bengal countries, which use the Port of Singapore for transshipment.

== Maritime history ==
=== Early history ===
Historic Indian cultural influence in South Asia and Southeast Asia: Indianized Hindu-Buddhist kingdoms within Greater India were spread across Indonesia and Malaysia (Srivijaya, Majapahit, Gangga Negara, Kalingga, Kutai, Singhasari, Tarumanagara and Pan Pan), Malaysia (Langkasuka, Thailand (Dvaravati), Indochina (Champa, Funan, and Chenla), and Myanmar (Pagan).

Prince Vijaya, the first recorded king of Sri Lanka, traveled from ancient Vanga (Bengal) through the Bay of Bengal to the island of Lanka and colonized it. Ancient Malay chronicles record the sailor Buddha Gupta traveling from Bengal to the Malay Archipelago through the Bay of Bengal. Ptolemy's map refers to the Bay of Bengal as the Gulf of the Ganges.

Hindu-Buddhist kingdoms in Southeast Asia depended on the Bay of Bengal for trade and cultural exchange. The South Indian Chola dynasty dominated the region in the 11th century, with records describing the Bay of Bengal as Chola's Lake.

Islam in Southeast Asia also spread through the Bay of Bengal, by serving as a bridge between the Malay Archipelago and Indo-Islamic states in the subcontinent.

In the 14th and 15th centuries, explorers like Ibn Battuta of Morocco, Niccolo De Conti of the Venetian Republic, and Admiral Zheng He of Imperial China ventured through the Bay of Bengal. The Maldives depended on the Bay of Bengal for its huge shell currency trade.

In the 16th century, the Portuguese Empire began traversing the sea routes of the Bay of Bengal. Portuguese maps referred to the bay as the "Gulf of Bengal". The Burmese Empires and the Kingdom of Mrauk U were major powers in the Bay of Bengal. The Kingdom of Mrauk U engaged in a naval war with the Mughal Empire of India in 1666. In the 18th century, numerous European trading companies established settlements across the region.

In the 19th century, the British government established direct crown rule in the Indian subcontinent; while the Dutch government established supremacy in the Indonesian archipelago. Colonialism disrupted and ended the region's traditional maritime networks.

=== Modern era ===
In the early 20th century, shipping between British India and British Burma rapidly increased. Rangoon became one of the world's busiest ports for immigrant arrivals, ranking alongside New York City. In Rangoon, thousands of Indian migrants arrived to settle in British Burma. The migration fostered strong economic links between India and Burma. British Burma's petroleum industry supplied much of India's petroleum demand. However, commercial links were disrupted during World War II, when Burma came under Japanese occupation. The Japanese took control of the Andaman Islands and used them as a penal colony. After the partition of India in 1947 and Burma's independence in 1948, there was a decline in Indo-Burmese commerce.

During the Indo-Pakistani War of 1971 over Bangladesh's independence, the Indian and Pakistani navies engaged in naval combat in the Bay of Bengal. A Pakistani submarine, the PNS Ghazi, sunk in the bay. In December 1971, the United States and Soviet Union mobilized naval strike groups around the Bay of Bengal.

Bangladesh and Myanmar engaged in a naval standoff over disputed maritime territory in 2008. The two countries settled their maritime boundary dispute in 2012 at the International Tribunal for the Law of the Sea. In 2014, India and Bangladesh resolved their maritime boundary disputes at a UN tribunal.

== Demographics ==
=== Population ===
According to Sunil S. Amrith, one in four people on earth live in the countries that border the Bay of Bengal. Its littoral areas — including coastal regions of eastern India, Bangladesh, Sri Lanka, Myanmar, Thailand, Malaysia, and Sumatra — are home to over half a billion people.

Most populous coastal cities among littoral Bay of Bengal countries
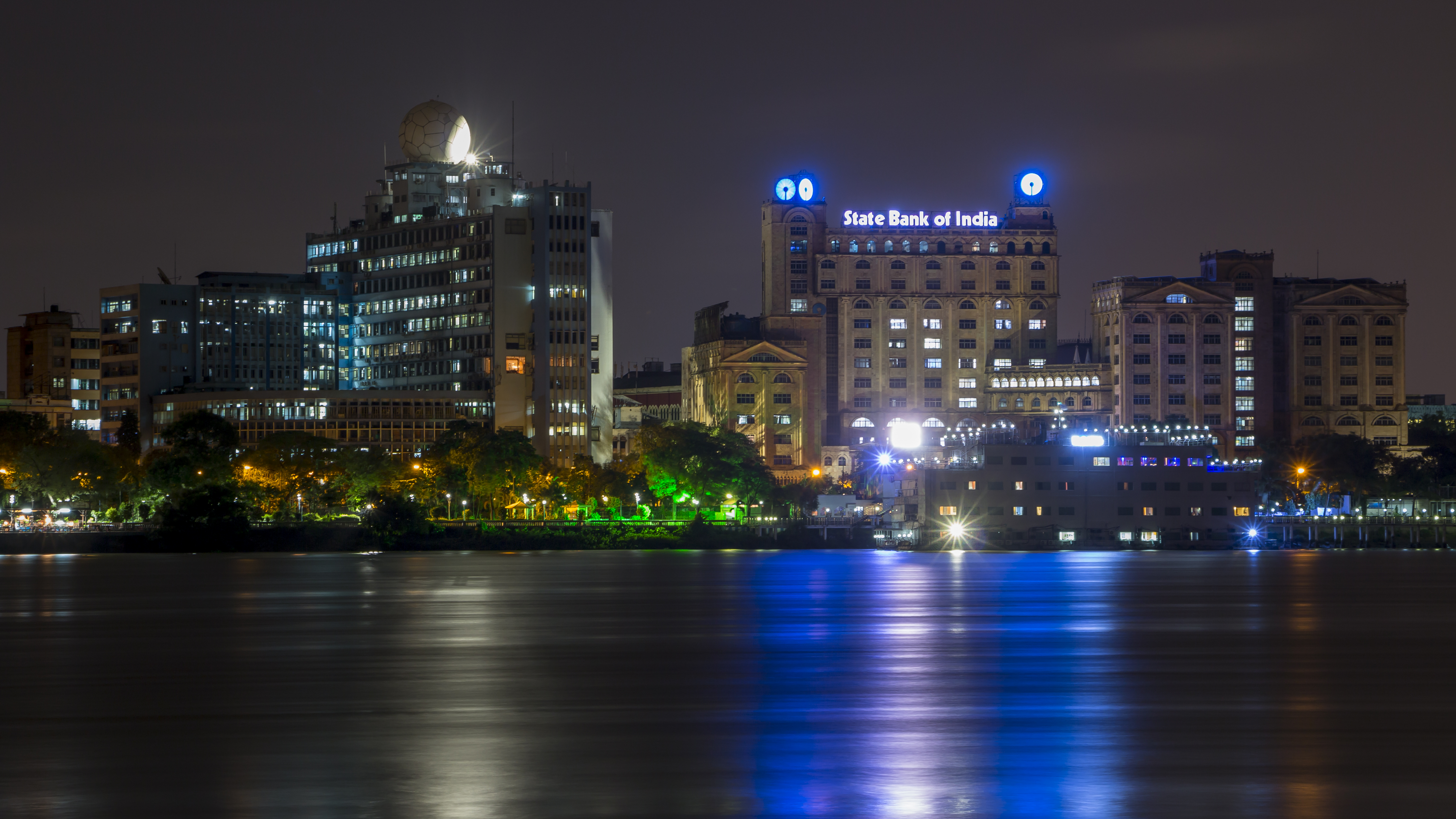
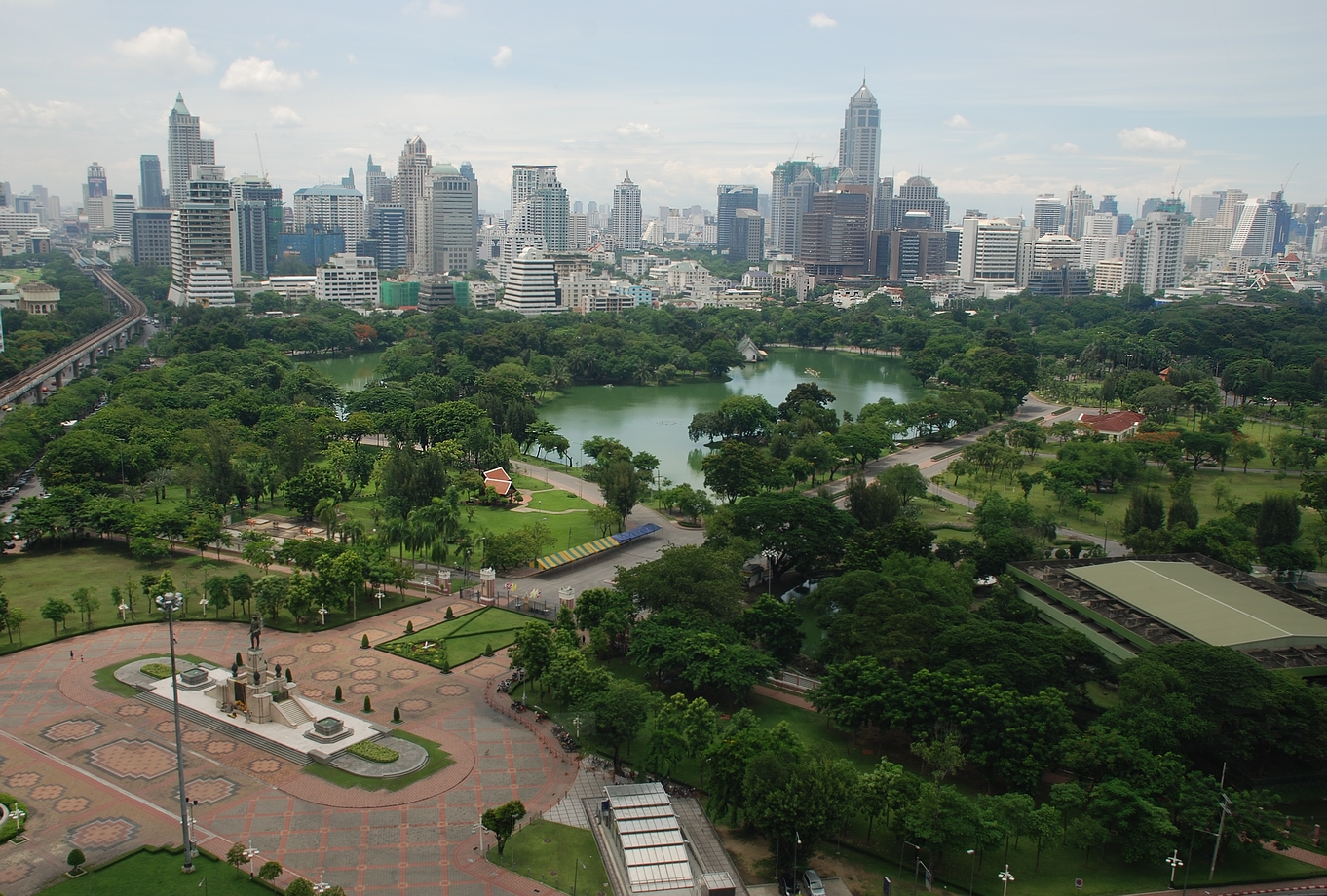
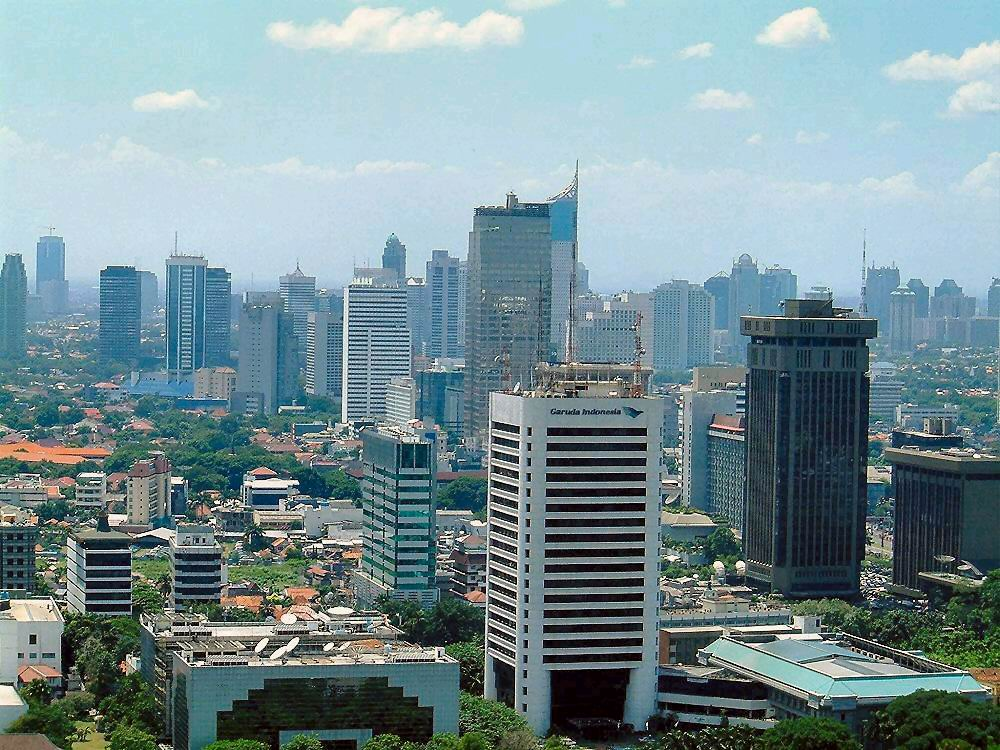
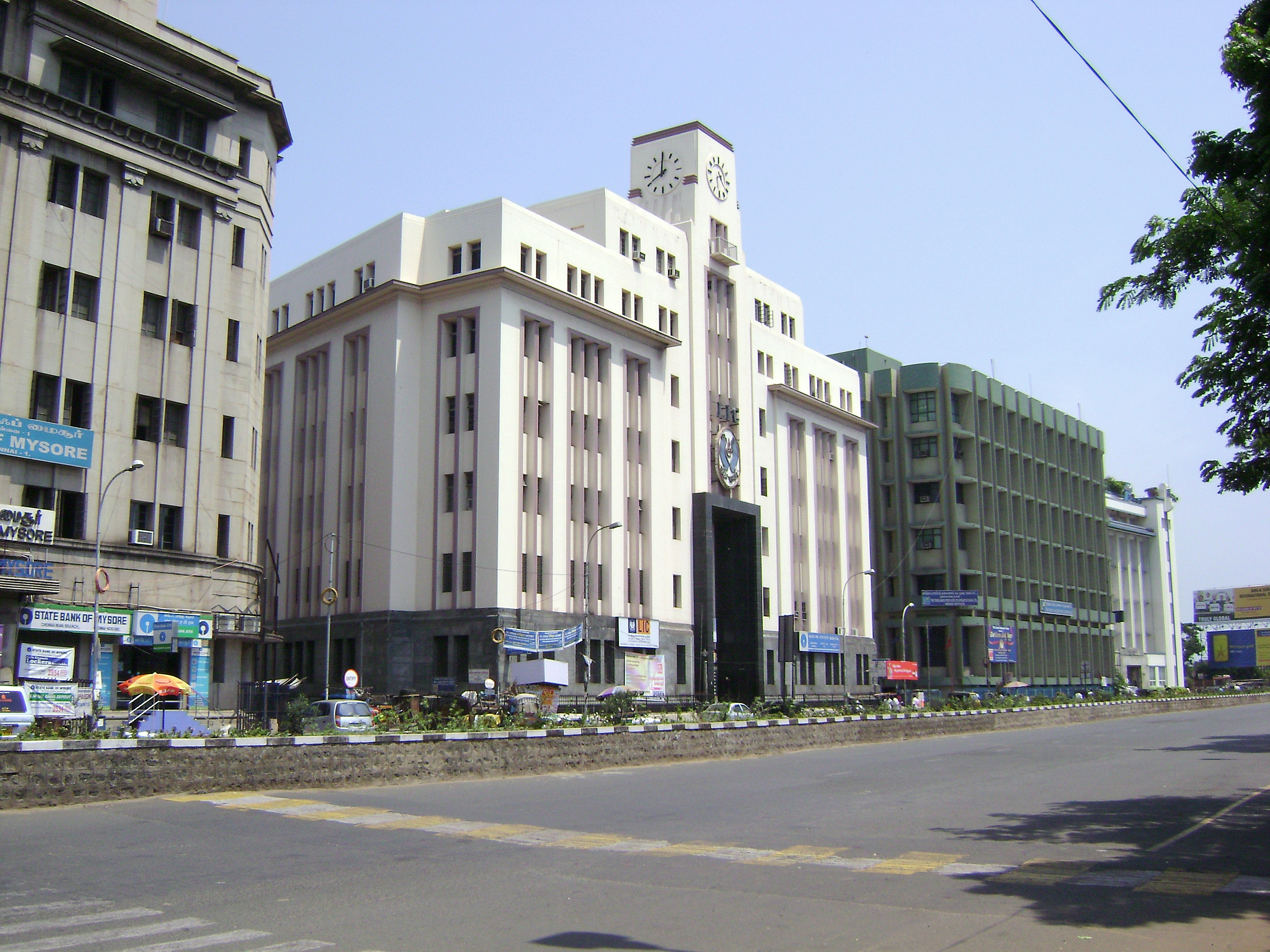
Kolkata Bangkok	Rank	City	Country	Region/County	Population (urban)	Jakarta Chennai
Kolkata Bangkok	1	Kolkata	India	West Bengal	14,617,882	Jakarta Chennai
Kolkata Bangkok	2	Bangkok	Thailand	Bangkok Province	14,565,547	Jakarta Chennai
Kolkata Bangkok	3	Jakarta	Indonesia	Special Capital Region	10,075,310	Jakarta Chennai
Kolkata Bangkok	4	Chennai	India	Tamil Nadu	8,917,749	Jakarta Chennai
Kolkata Bangkok	5	Yangon	Myanmar	Yangon Region	7,360,703	Jakarta Chennai
Kolkata Bangkok	6	Chittagong	Bangladesh	Chittagong Division	4,009,423	Jakarta Chennai
Kolkata Bangkok	7	Colombo	Sri Lanka	Western Province	2,323,826	Jakarta Chennai
Kolkata Bangkok	8	Khulna	Bangladesh	Khulna Division	1,636,441	Jakarta Chennai
Kolkata Bangkok	Sources: Census reports of Bangladesh, Thailand, India and Myanmar					Jakarta Chennai

== Economy ==
=== Statistical data (2021) ===
Country	Nominal GDP	Purchasing power parity	Per capita	Currency
Bangladesh	$416.26 billion	$1.11 trillion	$2,520	Bangladeshi taka
Bhutan	$2.547 billion	$7.701 billion	$3,117	Bhutanese ngultrum
China	$19.912 trillion	$30.18 trillion	$14,096	Renminbi
India	$3.535 trillion	$11.745 trillion	$2,543	Indian rupee
Indonesia	$1.150 trillion	$3.530 trillion	$4,224	Indonesian rupiah
Myanmar	$78 billion	$258 billion	$1,422	Myanmar kyat
Nepal	$36.084 billion	$122.62 billion	$1,236	Nepalese rupee
Sri Lanka	$84.532 billion	$306.997 billion	$3,830	Sri Lankan rupee
Thailand	$536.841 billion	$1,340 billion	$7,674	Thai baht

=== Fishing ===
Fisheries is an important economic activity in countries with coasts along the Bay of Bengal, particularly in Sri Lanka, India, Bangladesh, Myanmar, Thailand, and Indonesia. The fishing industry in the Bay of Bengal area provides employment and sustenance to large numbers of people. Based on a recent estimate, the total number employed on a full-time basis in fisheries in the area covered by the Bay of Bengal is 1.85 million. In addition, a large number of people are engaged in fishing as a part-time activity. The total population in the households of those engaged in fishing, full-time or part-time, in this area, is estimated at ten million.

In recent years, the fishing industry has developed into an important earner of foreign exchange through the export of marine and aquatic products. In Bangladesh, fish exports account for 15 percent of the total export earnings. Though the percentage contribution of the fisheries sector to the total export earnings of the country is yet marginal in the other countries in absolute terms, the export earnings have been increasing very fast. As export items, fish and fish products are very important, as the net earnings from these products are extremely high, a result of their being almost one hundred percent local resource-based.

The increased production of marine fish has come primarily through the motorization of traditional craft, the introduction of new craft, and the introduction and popularization of new types of synthetic gear, which have replaced traditional gear. It is in Thailand alone, that the private/commercial sector has taken the initiative of introducing and extending craft and gear; there has been very little state support or intervention in these activities in this country. The increasing emphasis accorded to the development of coastal aquaculture is another feature common to almost every country in the region. In countries such as Bangladesh, Sri Lanka, and India, a primary reason for the increased emphasis on coastal aquaculture is the increase in foreign exchange earnings generated from shrimp farming.

=== Tourism ===
Thailand's Andaman Coast is the largest hub of tourism in the region. Sri Lanka's tourism industry has seen growth despite decades of civil war in the country's north. Bangladesh and India have significantly developed their domestic tourism industries, such as in Cox's Bazar. South India's renowned temple cities, such as Tanjore, are located near the Bay of Bengal. In Bangladesh, the notable mosque city of Bagerhat is located near the Bay of Bengal. Myanmar has prioritized tourism development, particularly in cultural heritage sites like Mrauk U and Bagan.

=== Transport ===
The Port of Colombo in Sri Lanka handles over 5 million twenty-foot equivalent units (TEU)s of container traffic. The Port of Chittagong in Bangladesh handles over 2 million TEUs of container traffic. The Port of Chennai in India handles around 1.7 million TEUs of container traffic. Ports that handle over 100,000 TEUs of container traffic include the Port of Kolkata, Tuticorin Port Trust, the Port of Yangon, the Port of Mongla, and the Port of Vizag. Colombo is the busiest seaport in BIMSTEC. Chittagong is the busiest seaport on the Bay of Bengal coastline, followed by Chennai, Kolkata, Tuticorin, Yangon, Visakhapatnam, and Mongla. Sittwe Port and Hambantota are other important ports in the region.

Thailand and India signed direct coastal shipping agreements with Bangladesh in 2016.

==== Busiest seaports (2015-16) ====
Top seaports in the Bay of Bengal littoral region
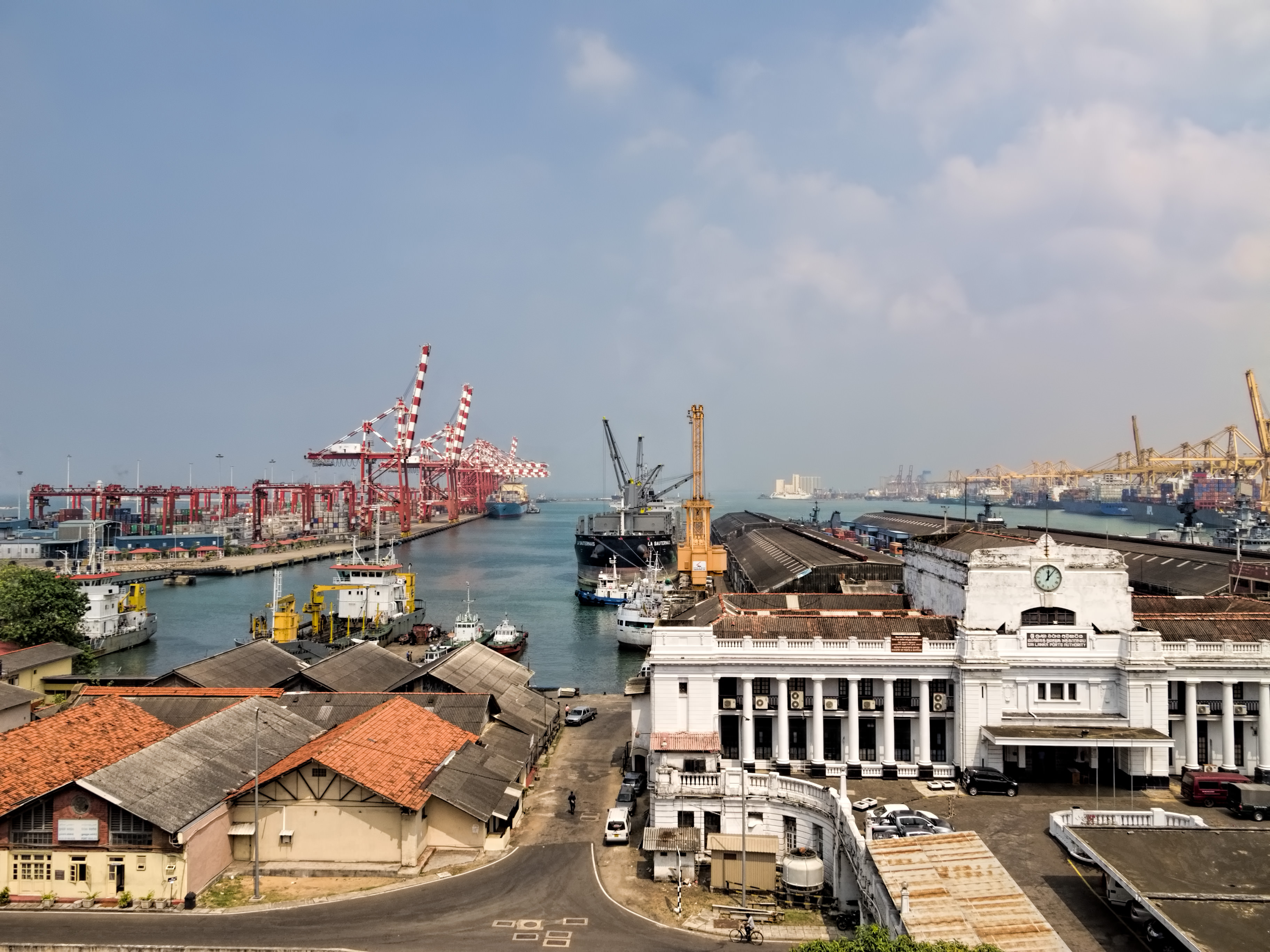
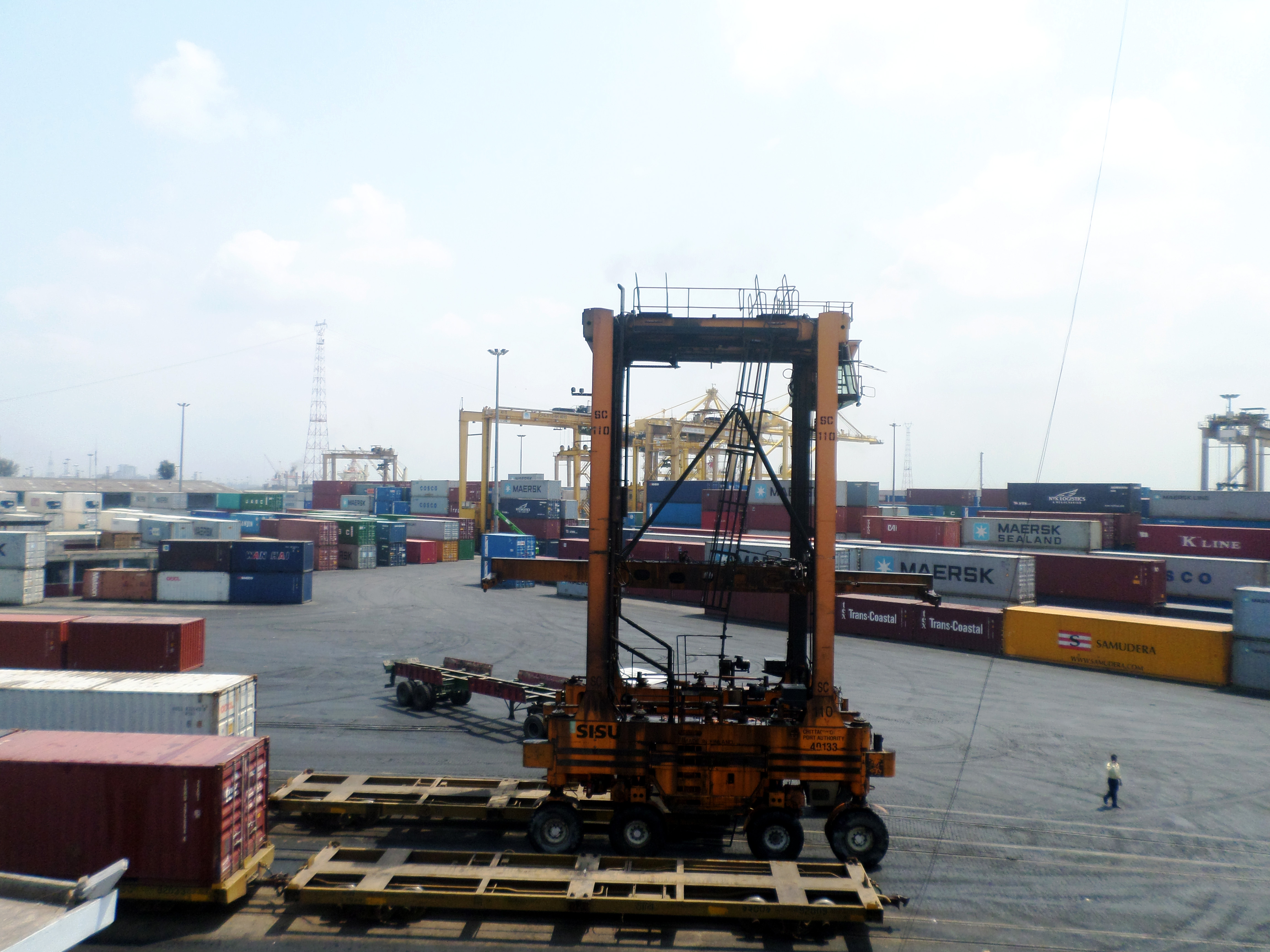
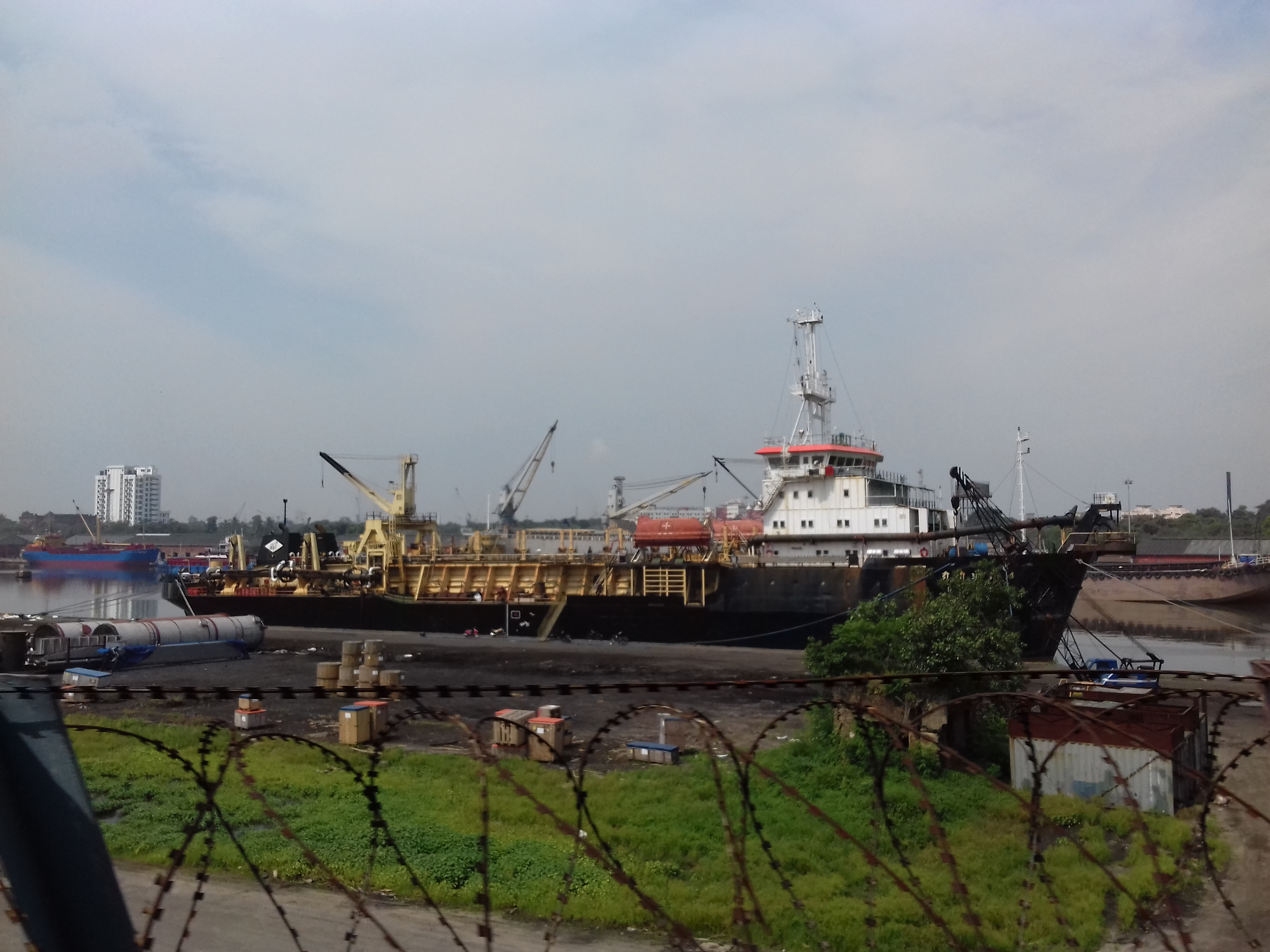
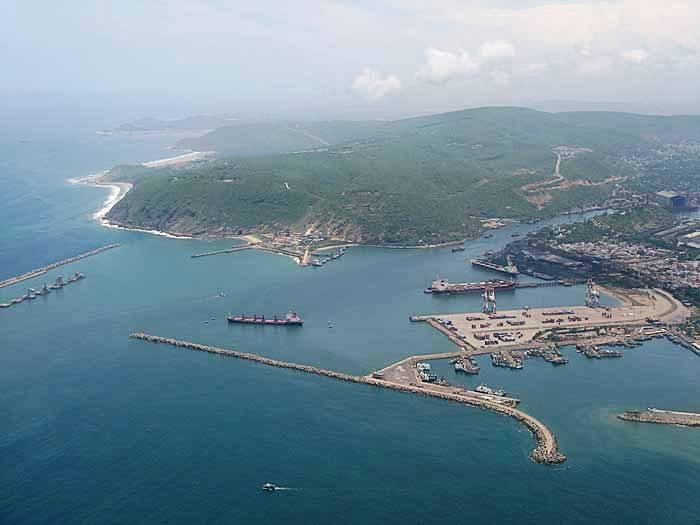
Colombo Chittagong	Rank	Port City	Harbour	Country	Container traffic (TEU)	Kolkata Vizag
Colombo Chittagong	1	Colombo	Port of Colombo	Sri Lanka	5 million	Kolkata Vizag
Colombo Chittagong	2	Chittagong	Port of Chittagong	Bangladesh	2.2 million	Kolkata Vizag
Colombo Chittagong	3	Chennai	Port of Chennai	India	1.5 million	Kolkata Vizag
Colombo Chittagong	4	Kolkata	Port of Kolkata	India	630,000	Kolkata Vizag
Colombo Chittagong	5	Tuticorin	Tuticorin Port Trust	India	560,000	Kolkata Vizag
Colombo Chittagong	6	Visakhapatnam	Visakhapatnam Port	India	291,000	Kolkata Vizag
Colombo Chittagong	7	Yangon	Port of Yangon	Myanmar	244,888	Kolkata Vizag
Colombo Chittagong	8	Mongla	Port of Mongla	Bangladesh	100,000	Kolkata Vizag

=== Oil and gas ===
The Bay of Bengal has large untapped oil and natural gas reserves. Geologists believe the region holds many of the largest reserves in the Asia-Pacific. Currently, there are few offshore platforms operating in the Bay of Bengal. The Shwe offshore platform is operated by Daewoo International for supplies to China through Myanmar. Bangladesh's Sangu platform, which opened in 1994, was shut down in 2013. India's Reliance Industries began production in an offshore block near India's coast in 2009.

== Security and strategic importance ==
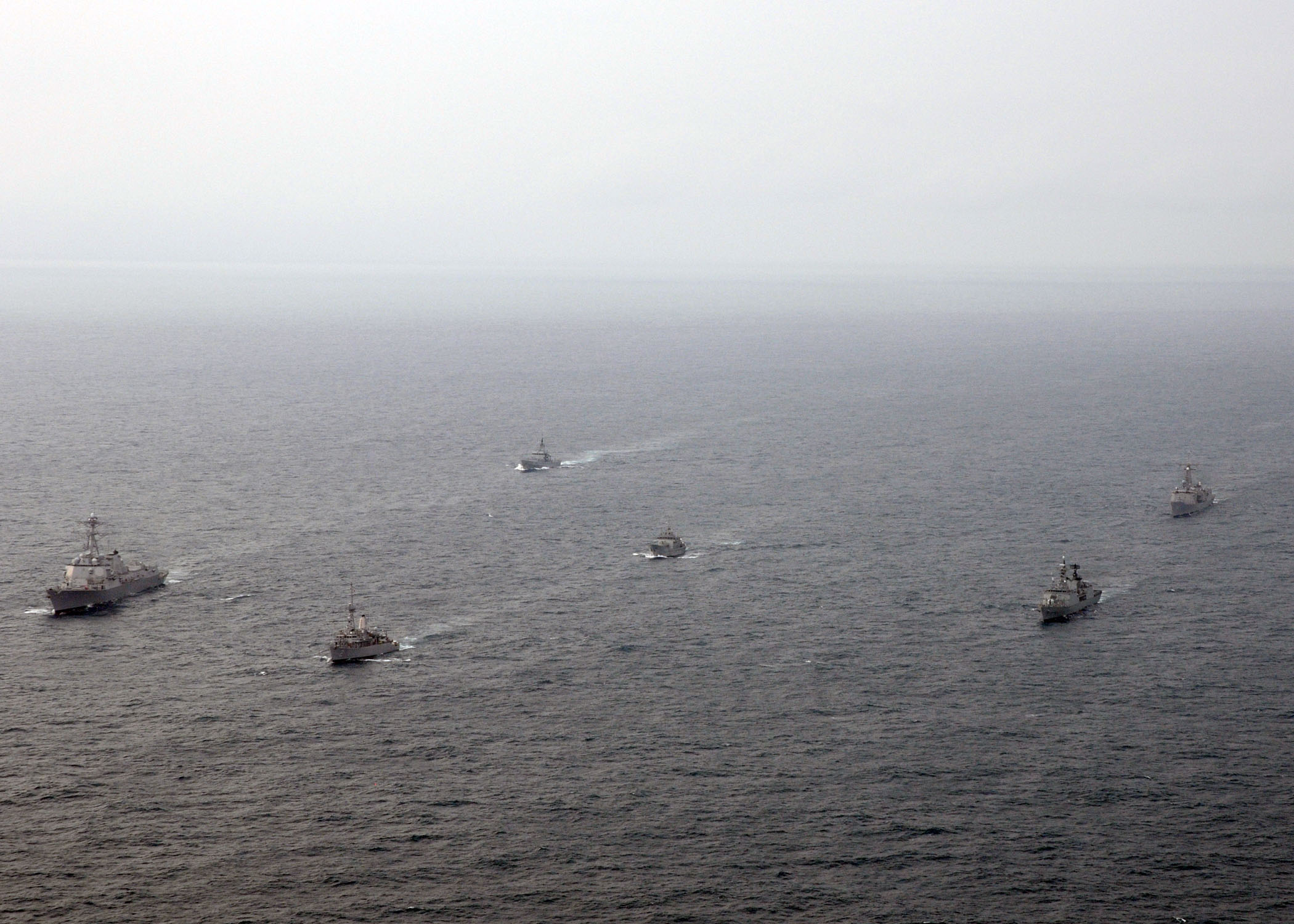
CARAT 2013 in the Bay of Bengal

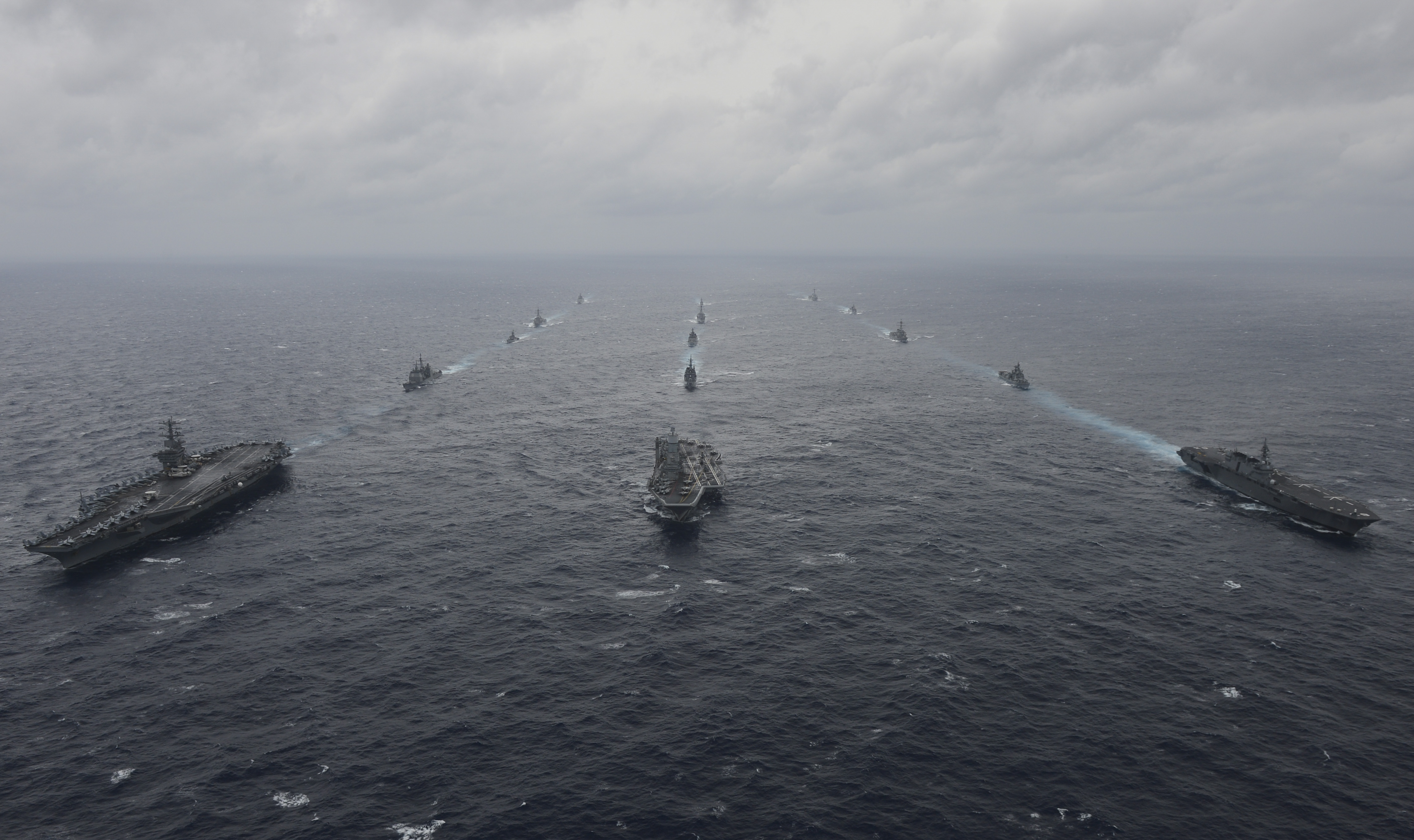
Malabar 2017 in the Bay of Bengal

=== Common security space ===
The BIMSTEC countries view the Bay of Bengal as a common security space. The first conference of national security chiefs in the region was held in 2017.

=== Non-traditional security challenges ===
The Bay of Bengal has non-traditional security challenges of piracy, human trafficking, terrorist networks, and drug smuggling, which has led to greater cooperation between the navies of Bangladesh, India, the United States, and Thailand.

=== Sino-Indian rivalry ===
The Bay of Bengal is a prime zone of strategic competition between two of Asia's largest countries- China and India. An example is in the case of Myanmar, where the Sino-Myanmar pipelines and Chinese-funded Kyaukpyu port project were followed by the Kaladan Multi-Modal Transit Transport Project funded by India. China and India have jostled for strategic influence in Bangladesh, Sri Lanka and Nepal. The Sri Lankan port of Hambantota was built by the Chinese.

=== Japanese initiatives ===
In 2014, Japanese Prime Minister Shinzo Abe announced an initiative to develop an industrial corridor in Bangladesh to strengthen Japan's economic footprint in the region. The initiative is termed the "Bay of Bengal Industrial Growth Belt" (BIG-B). Japan is keen to establish a maritime surveillance center for the Indian Ocean region in Sri Lanka.

=== Naval competition ===
Bangladesh, Thailand, and Myanmar depend on China as a source of military equipment. Some analysts have speculated that an arms race emerging between these countries.

=== Joint exercises ===
The United States, a major Indo-Pacific naval power, conducts the Cooperation Afloat Readiness and Training (CARAT) involving Bangladesh, Brunei, Cambodia, Indonesia, Malaysia, the Philippines, Singapore and Thailand. In 2011, CARAT was held off the coast of southeastern Bangladesh. The Malabar naval exercise is held by the navies of the United States, India, and Japan.

=== Natural disaster management ===
The Bay of Bengal region has seen some of modern history's worst natural disasters, such as the 1970 Bhola cyclone and the 2004 Indian Ocean tsunami. The international community often mobilizes naval forces to assist in relief operations in the aftermath of devastating natural disasters, most recently after Cyclone Sidr and Cyclone Nargis.

== See also ==
- Global Southeast
- Eastern South Asia
- Andaman Sea
- Andaman and Nicobar Islands
- History of Indian influence on Southeast Asia
- Kra Isthmus
- Maritime Silk Road
