= Ministry of Development of North Eastern Region =

Government ministry of India

- Branch of Government of India

- Ministry of Development of North Eastern Region

Agency overview
- Formed: September 2001
- Jurisdiction: Government of India
- Headquarters: Vigyan Bhavan Annexe, Maulana Azad Road, New Delhi -110 011.
- Annual budget: ₹6,812.30 crore (US$710 million) (2026-27 Budget Est.)
- Ministers responsible: Jyotiraditya Scindia, Cabinet Minister; Dr. Sukanta Majumdar, Minister of State
- Website: mdoner.gov.in

The Ministry of Development of North Eastern Region is a Government of India ministry, established in September 2001, which functions as the nodal Department of the Central Government to deal with matters related to the socio-economic development of the eight States of Northeast India: Arunachal Pradesh, Assam, Manipur, Meghalaya, Mizoram, Nagaland, Tripura and Sikkim. It acts as a facilitator between the Central Ministries/ Departments and the State Governments of the North Eastern Region in the economic development including removal of infrastructural bottlenecks, provision of basic minimum services, creating an environment for private investment and to remove impediments to lasting peace and security in the North Eastern Region.

The current Minister of Development of North Eastern Region is Jyotiraditya Scindia.

== Functions and responsibilities ==
The Department of Development of North Eastern Region (DoNER) was created in 2001 and was accorded the status of a full-fledged ministry in May 2004. The ministry is mainly concerned with the creation of infrastructure for economic development of North-Eastern region.

Main activities/functions of the DoNER.

- Non Lapsible Central Pool of Resources (NLCPR) Coordination with the Central Ministries and the State Governments of the NE states.
- Capacity Building
- Advocacy and Publicity
- International Cooperation
- Enterprises of the Department

== Organisations ==
The ministry has following organisations functioning under it:

- North Eastern Development Finance Corporation Ltd.(NEDFi)
- North Eastern Regional Agricultural Marketing Corporation Limited (NERAMAC)
- The Sikkim Mining Corporation Limited. (SMC)
- North Eastern Handlooms and Handicrafts Development Corporation (NEHHDC)
- North East Cane and Bamboo Development Council

== Cabinet Ministers ==
Portrait	Minister (Birth-Death) Constituency	Term of office			Political party	Ministry	Prime Minister
Portrait	Minister (Birth-Death) Constituency	From	To	Period	Political party	Ministry	Prime Minister
	Arun Shourie (born 1941); Rajya Sabha MP for Uttar Pradesh	1 September 2001	29 January 2003	1 year, 150 days	Bharatiya Janata Party	Vajpayee III	Atal Bihari Vajpayee
	C. P. Thakur (born 1931); MP for Patna	29 January 2003	22 May 2004	1 year, 114 days	Bharatiya Janata Party	Vajpayee III	Atal Bihari Vajpayee
	Paty Ripple Kyndiah (1928–2015); MP for Shillong	23 May 2004	24 October 2006	2 years, 154 days	Indian National Congress	Manmohan I	Manmohan Singh
	Mani Shankar Aiyar (born 1941); MP for Mayiladuthurai	24 October 2006	22 May 2009	2 years, 210 days	Indian National Congress	Manmohan I	Manmohan Singh
	Bijoy Krishna Handique (1934–2015); MP for Jorhat	28 May 2009	12 July 2011	2 years, 45 days	Indian National Congress	Manmohan II	Manmohan Singh
	Paban Singh Ghatowar (born 1950); MP for Dibrugarh (Minister of State, I/C)	12 July 2011	26 May 2014	2 years, 318 days	Indian National Congress	Manmohan II	Manmohan Singh
	General; V. K. Singh (Retd.); PVSM AVSM YSM ADC (born 1950); MP for Ghaziabad (Minister of State, I/C)	27 May 2014	9 November 2014	167 days	Bharatiya Janata Party	Modi I	Narendra Modi
	Jitendra Singh (born 1956); MP for Udhampur (Minister of State, I/C)	9 November 2014	30 May 2019	6 years, 240 days	Bharatiya Janata Party	Modi I	Narendra Modi
	Jitendra Singh (born 1956); MP for Udhampur (Minister of State, I/C)	31 May 2019	7 July 2021	6 years, 240 days	Bharatiya Janata Party	Modi II	Narendra Modi
	G. Kishan Reddy (born 1964); MP for Secunderabad	7 July 2021	9 June 2024	2 years, 338 days	Bharatiya Janata Party	Modi II	Narendra Modi
	Jyotiraditya Scindia (born 1971); MP for Guna	10 June 2024	Incumbent	2 years, 136 days	Bharatiya Janata Party	Modi III	Narendra Modi

== Ministers of State ==
Portrait	Minister (Birth-Death) Constituency	Term of office			Political party	Ministry	Prime Minister
Portrait	Minister (Birth-Death) Constituency	From	To	Period	Political party	Ministry	Prime Minister
	Tapan Sikdar (1944–2014); MP for Dum Dum	29 January 2003	22 May 2004	1 year, 114 days	Bharatiya Janata Party	Vajpayee III	Atal Bihari Vajpayee
	B. L. Verma (born 1961); Rajya Sabha MP for Uttar Pradesh	7 July 2021	9 June 2024	2 years, 338 days	Bharatiya Janata Party	Modi II	Narendra Modi
	Sukanta Majumdar (born 1979); MP for Balurghat	10 June 2024	Incumbent	2 years, 136 days	Bharatiya Janata Party	Modi III	Narendra Modi

== Northeast India connectivity projects ==
Commerce with South and East Asian nations accounts for almost 45% of India's foreign trade. Myanmar and ASEAN nations are part of India's Look East policy. India is part of ASEAN+6, Asia Cooperation Dialogue, Asia-Pacific Economic Cooperation, Asian Clearing Union, Asian Development Bank, Bangladesh Bhutan India Nepal Initiative, BIMSTEC, East Asia Summit, Mekong-Ganga Cooperation, SAARC, South Asia Subregional Economic Cooperation, United Nations Economic and Social Commission for Asia and the Pacific, Asian Highway Network and the Trans-Asian Railway network.

Major initiatives covered are Transport between India and Bangladesh, Bangladesh–India border, India-Myanmar barrier, Bhutan–India border, McMahon Line, etc.

=== Bridges ===
- List of road bridges on Brahmaputra River

=== Roads ===
==== International roads ====
NE has 5,000 km border with Nepal, Bhutan, China, Bangladesh and Myanmar while being isolated and connected to rest of India by 20 km narrow chicken-neck Siliguri Corridor.

- Asian Highway Network
- ASEAN and Look East connectivity

==== Strategic National Highways (NH) ====
13,500 km were NH out of total 3,76,819 km of road length in NE (March 2012).

- Schemes: Bharatmala and NH
  - Non Lapsable Central Pool of Resources (NLCPR) plan for NE and Look East connectivity.
  - Special Accelerated Road Development Programme in North East (SARDP-NE) plan for the China border roads.
- Funding:
  - Total approved (A+B): ₹626,000 million (equivalent to ₹960 billion or US$10 billion in 2026) (until Dec 2017).
  - A. ₹326,000 million (equivalent to ₹500 billion or US$5.2 billion in 2026) 3,840 km approved and ₹135,000 million (equivalent to ₹210 billion or US$2.1 billion in 2026) 1,266 km completed (2014 to Dec 2017).
    - ₹53,000 million (equivalent to ₹81 billion or US$840 million in 2026) additional funding released to ensure completion by March 2023 of current NE NH projects by plugging the gap, on 100% centre-funding basis, instead of usual 90:10 centre-state funding mechanism (Dec 2017).
  - B. ₹300,000 million (equivalent to ₹460 billion or US$4.8 billion in 2026) additional approved under Bharatmala for NE NH (Dec 2017).
- Routes:
  Major NE NH route map and SARDP Arunachal roads map.
- Highways:
  - Arunachal Frontier Highway 2,000 km route along the China border in upper Himalayas, ₹400,000 million (equivalent to ₹700 billion or US$7.2 billion in 2026)
  - Trans-Arunachal Highway NH13 1,559 km route through the middle via 12 district HQ while connecting the remaining 4 district HQ with link highways, at ₹100,000 million (US$1.0 billion) (c. 2008) under SARDP-NE.
    - Northeast border roads:
      - NHIDCL launched in 2015 building of 100 strategic 7,000 km long border roads at the cost of ₹800,000 million (equivalent to ₹1.2 trillion, US$13 billion or €11 billion in 2026) across India including in Arunachal (Dec 2017 update).
      - BRO border roads:
        — 73 border roads: incl. Sikkim and Arunachal, all to be completed by March 2022 (June 2017).
        — 410 border bridges:
        - 144 in Arunachal (75 under construction completing by 2020),
        - 40 in Sikkim under construction (Dec 2017).
        — 17 border rail and road tunnels: total length of 100 km,
        - Arunachal (Nechipu Pass (near Bomdila) and Sela Pass tunnels on Bogibeel Assam to Sagalee to Tawang NH13),
        - North Sikkim (578 meter Theng Pass tunnel on NH310A between Chungthang and Tung) (Dec 2017).
  - Arunachal East-West Corridor along the Assam border in the lower foothills (marked in red) is being taken under Bharatmala project.
  - 2,570 km approved NH (1917+653 in-progress and completed) in Arunachal, 36% road connectivity, 22 km per 100 km^{2} Arunachal road density including dirt tracks (c. Nov 2017).

==== Other roads ====
- North Eastern Council inter-state projects and roads:
  - 47 new inter-state roads of 1,666 km costing ₹50,000 million (equivalent to ₹77 billion or US$790 million in 2026), of which 4 were taken within plan ending March 2017.
  - 2014 to Dec 2017:
    - ₹23,090 million (equivalent to ₹35 billion or US$370 million in 2026) projects executed,
    - ₹5,790 million (equivalent to ₹8.9 billion or US$92 million in 2026) to ₹9,690 million (equivalent to ₹15 billion or US$150 million in 2026) rise in the annual budget.
    - 56 to 138 increase in the number of projects, incl. Bramputra Study Centre established to research river ecosystem.
- PMGSY roads in NE, including border village roads]. Relaxation to be given to the minimum 250 people habitation in case of villages within 50 km of border.

=== Railway ===
- Northeast railway connectivity projects
- Trans-Asian Railway
- NER railways, In December 2017, 15 new NE railway projects of 1,385 km length were approved at the cost of ₹470,000 million (equivalent to ₹720 billion, US$7.5 billion or €6.6 billion in 2026).
  - Sivok–Rangpo line, 44 km long, to Gangtok in Sikkim.
  - Tetelia–Byrnihat line, 22 km long, from Guwahati's suburb Tetelia to Byrnihat near Shillon in Meghalaya is likely to be completed by March 2022.
  - Dimapur–Kohima line, 82 km long, to Kohima In Nagaland is expected to be completed by March 2023.
  - Jiribam–Imphal line, 111 km long, to Imphal is likely to be completed by March 2022.
  - Bairabi–Sairang line, 51 km long, to Aizawl in Mizoram is likely to be completed by March 2023.

=== Air ===
==== Airports development ====
NER Airports. The Indian government upgraded 12 non-operational airports into operational airports in NE (May 2017, work started on 8 airports in 2014). LGBIA Guwahati will operate as the inter-regional hub and Maharaja Bir Bikram Airport in Agartala, Dibrugarh Airport and Bir Tikendrajit International Airport in Imphal, will operate as intra-regional hubs by extending runways and apron, and by building terminal building and maintenance hangars at these airports. Three new greenfield under-construction airports are Itanagar Holangi Airport, Pakyong Airport-Operationalized (Sikkim) and Chiethu Airport (Nagaland).

===== Airports development phase-I (F.Y 2016-17 to F.Y 2019-20) =====
Airports Authority of India (AAI) will spend ₹25,000 million (equivalent to ₹38 billion, US$400 million or €350 million in 2026) between 2018 and 2020, including the following will be completed by 2019-20 (c. Dec 2017):

- Assam
  - Lokpriya Gopinath Bordoloi International Airport, Guwahati has reached its most defining milestone with the successful opening of its state-of-the-art Terminal 2 (T2) on February 22, 2026.In February 2019, the airport was given on lease for 50 years' ownership to Adani Group, at the highest bid of ₹ 160 per passenger
- Arunachal Pradesh
  - Donyi Polo Airport is fully operational
  - Tezu Airport infrastructure upgrade has been fully completed and operationalized at a total cost of ₹170 crore with terminal building was built to handle up to 300 peak-hour passengers, featuring 5 check-in counters and 2 arrival carousels
- Tripura
  - Maharaja Bir Bikram Airport in Agartala is the second-busiest aviation hub in Northeast India after Guwahati,
  - Kailashahar Airport upgrade for UDAN flights, 138 km from Agartala.
- Meghalaya
  - Shillong Airport s undergoing a massive ₹119.44 crore infrastructure expansion that will finally allow narrow-body commercial jets to land.

===== Airports development phase-II (2018-Ongoing) =====
The central government will invest a further ₹80,000 million (equivalent to ₹120 billion, US$1.3 billion or €1.1 billion in 2026) to develop more NR airports. Several advanced landing ground heliports will be upgraded to dual army-civilian airports. This likely includes the following:

- Arunachal Pradesh
  - Along Airport is a military airfield owned and operated by the Indian Air Force
  - Anini Airport, Government of Arunachal Pradesh officially launched a greenfield airport project
  - Daporijo Airport is a non-operational historical airstrip under the control of the Indian Air Force
  - Koloriang Airport a newly upgraded heliport infrastructure
  - Pasighat Airport is a dual-use military and civilian facility operating as an Advanced Landing Ground for the Indian Air Force alongside scheduled regional commercial flights
  - Tawang Airport its aviation needs are fully managed by the Tawang Advanced Landing Ground (ALG), which operates exclusively as a strategic heliport
  - Zero Airport is a fully operational domestic airport and Advanced Landing Ground
- Assam
  - Rupsi Airport is a fully operational domestic airport
- Sikkim
  - Pakyong Airport is Sikkim's only operational airport
- Nagaland
  - Chiethu Airport s a planned greenfield facility that remains in the pre-construction planning stage due to long-standing terrain and political disputes

==== Flights ====
Among airports in Northeast India, the following were connected under UDAN:

===== UDAN flights =====
UDAN Phase-I flights started at Shillong Airport, Dimapur Airport, Bir Tikendrajit International Airport, Silchar Airport, Lengpui Aizawl Airport and Maharaja Bir Bikram Airport.

UDAN Phase-II flights starting date–TBA

===== Other flights =====
2014–2017 NEC plan proposes to work towards starting the following flights:

- Netaji Subhash Chandra Bose International Airport, Kolkata to
  - Guwahati–Kunming
  - Dimapur–Bangkok
- Lokpriya Gopinath Bordoloi International Airport, Guwahati to
  - Imphal–Yangon
  - Yangon–Bangkok
  - Mandalay–Kunming
  - Shillong–Dhaka
- Maharaja Bir Bikram Airport, Agartala to
  - Dimapur–Yangon
  - Dhaka
- Imphal Airport to Mandalay–Bangkok
- Silchar Airport to Imphal–Mandalay

=== Waterways ===
==== International NE waterways ====
- India-Myanmar
  - Kaladan Multi-Modal Transit Transport Project
- India-Bangladesh
  - Waterways as per "Indo-Bangladesh Protocol on Inland Water Transit & Trade":
    - Kolkata-Pandu, Guwahati-Kolkata
    - Kolkata-Karimganj-Kolkata
    - Rajshahi-Dhulian-Rajshahi
    - Pandu-Karimganj-Pandu
  - Seaports for inter-country trade
    - India: Haldia Port (West Bengal), Syama Prasad Mookerjee Port (West Bengal), Pandu, Guwahati (Assam), Karimganj (Assam) and Silghat (Assam).
    - Bangladesh: Port of Narayanganj, Khulna, Port of Mongla, Sirajganj and Ashuganj.

==== Inland National waterways in NE ====
- NER Waterways: 20 National Waterways in NE
  - National Waterway 2: Sadiya and Dhubri on Bangladesh-India border 891 km stretch of Brahmaputra River is already operational.
  - 19 additional NE National Waterways under development (as of Dec 2017).
    - NW6: Aai River, Assam, 71 km.
    - NW16: Barak River, Assam, 121 km.
    - NW18: Beki River, Assam, 73 km.
    - NW30: Dihing River, Assam, 114 km.
    - NW31: Dhansiri River-Chathe River, Assam, 110 km.
    - NW32: Dikhu River, Assam, 63 km.
    - NW33: Doyans River, Assam, 61 km.
    - NW38: Gangadhar River, Assam & West Bengal, 62 km.
    - NW39: Ganol River, Meghalaya, 49 km.
    - NW50: Jinjiram River, Assam & Meghalaya, 43 km.
    - NW57: Kopili River, Assam, 46 km.
    - NW61: Kumari River, Meghalaya, 28 km.
    - NW62: Lohit River, Assam, 100 km.
    - NW82: Puthimari River, Assam, 72 km.
    - NW93: Simsang River, Meghalaya, 62 km.
    - NW95: Subansiri River, Assam, 111 km.
    - NW101: Tizu River-Zungki River, Nagaland.
    - NW102: Tlawng River, Mizoram, 86 km.
    - NW106: Umngot River, Meghalaya, 20 km.
  - More potential NER National Waterwaysare being considered.

=== Power ===
As of December 2017, ₹98,650 million (equivalent to ₹150 billion, US$1.6 billion or €1.4 billion in 2026) power transmission grid project approved in 2014 is being implemented of which 2,540 km lines already laid, and 16 hydro power projects of 5676 MW being implemented and additional 694 MW projects already implemented.

=== Tourism ===
Projects include approval of ₹2,070 million (equivalent to ₹3.2 billion, US$33 million or €29 million in 2026) in 2016 to prevent erosion of world's largest riverine island of Majuli, development of Spiritual Circuit in Manipur, Tourist Circuit in Sikkim, Tribal Circuit in Nagaland and Umiam Lake in Meghalaya (Dec 2017 update).

== Look-East Connectivity ==
Commerce with South and East Asian nations accounts for almost 45% of India's foreign trade. Myanmar and ASEAN nations are part of India's Look East policy. India is part of ASEAN+6, Asia Cooperation Dialogue, Asian Clearing Union, Asian Development Bank, Bangladesh Bhutan India Nepal Initiative, BIMSTEC, East Asia Summit, Mekong-Ganga Cooperation, SAARC, South Asia Subregional Economic Cooperation, United Nations Economic and Social Commission for Asia and the Pacific, Asian Highway Network and the Trans-Asian Railway network.

=== Seaport development ===
- Sittwe Port, Myanmar's multimodel port being developed by India
- Sabang Deepsea Port, jointly developed by India and Indonesia under strategic military and economic agreement, Indira Point, India's southernmost point, is close to Indonesia's Rondo Island and Aceh Province.

See also Extreme points of India

=== India-Myanmar-China Stilwell Road revival ===
Discussions are also proceeding on reopening the World War II-era Stilwell Road linking India's Assam state with China's Yunnan province through Myanmar.

=== India–Myanmar–Thailand Trilateral Highway ===
India–Myanmar–Thailand Trilateral Highway, also known as the East-West Economic Corridor, is a 3,200 km (2,000 mi) from India to Vietnam highway under construction under India's Look East policy, that will connect Moreh, India with Mae Sot, Thailand via Myanmar. It is AH1 of Asian Highway Network. The road is expected to boost trade and commerce in the ASEAN–India Free Trade Area, as well as with the rest of Southeast Asia. India has also proposed extending the highway to Cambodia, Laos and Vietnam.

India and ASEAN have plans to extend this route to Laos, Cambodia and Vietnam as this connectivity will generate annually, an estimated US$70 billion in incremental GDP and 20 million in incremental aggregate employment by 2025, and India has offered US$1 billion line-of-credit for this project (c. Dec 2017).

=== Imphal-Moreh-Mandalay national highway upgrade ===
Imphal-Moreh-Mandalay Highway currently exists. In May 2017, the Indian Ministry of Road Transport and Highway stated that it would spend an estimated ₹7,500 million (equivalent to ₹11 billion or US$120 million in 2026) to upgrade roads and highways in North East India in order to boost the region's connectivity with Myanmar and Bangladesh. Among these projects, the Ministry plans to widen the 108 km (67 mi) Imphal-Moreh highway in Manipur which currently serves as an important trade route between India and Myanmar. This would provide the Manipur's capital city of Imphal with direct access to the trilateral highway.

=== Zokhawthar-Mandalay road strengthening ===
Mizoram-Kalemyo Highway is a road widening and strengthening project planned by India. In May 2017, the Indian Ministry of Road Transport also plans to construct a 120 km (75 mi) highway linking Zokhawthar-Rikhawdar (also called "Rih") near Champhai, a border town in Mizoram, with the trilateral highway at Kalemyo. This will serve as a second route providing direct connectivity from Mizoram to the trilateral highway.

=== Mago-Thingbu to Vijaynagar Border Road ===
The Mago-Thingbu–Vijaynagar Border Highway, also known as Arunachal Frontier Highway, in Arunachal Pradesh India is a 2,000-kilometre-long (1,200 mi) road proposed to be built along the McMahon Line (international border between India and China) by the Government of India at the cost of INR40,000 crore (approx. US$6.5 billion as per 2014 prices). Currently, along the alignment of this proposed road there is "little habitation" and there are only "small stretches of minor roads". An assessment by the Ministry of Defence (India) in 2013 found that of the 503 stretches on the borders planned to be completed by 2022, only 17 were complete and work was underway on just 50. In 2014 October, Kiren Rijiju, Union Minister of State for Home Affairs of India was trying to expedite the project along with another proposed highway East-West Industrial Corridor Highway, Arunachal Pradesh in Arunachal Pradesh as he said "I am proposing to undertake this road along with another in the foothill areas of Arunachal Pradesh state from Bhairabkunda in Assam located at the tri-junction of Bhutan, Assam and Arunachal Pradesh to Ruksin in East Siang district of Arunachal Pradesh state which will serve as an industrial corridor for the people residing in the foothill areas of the state".

=== Manipur-Mandalay bus service from 2018 ===
Manipur-Mandalay bus service is pending subject to the signing of motor vehicle agreement. In September 2017, Indian ambassador to Myanmar announced that an Imphal-Mandalay India-Myanmar bus service will commence from 2018 after India and Myanmar sign the motor vehicle agreement.

=== Imphal-Kalay-Mandalay flight ===
Imphal-Kalay-Mandalay flight is a proposed air service. In September 2017, Indian ambassador to Myanmar also proposed that a flight service from Imphal in Manipur to Mandalay via stopover in Kalay (Kalaymyo) in Sagaing Division of Myanmar could be started under UDAN regional connectivity scheme. It was proposed to DoNER in 2012 and a successful trial run was conducted in December 2015.

=== Tinsukia-Myitkyina railway ===
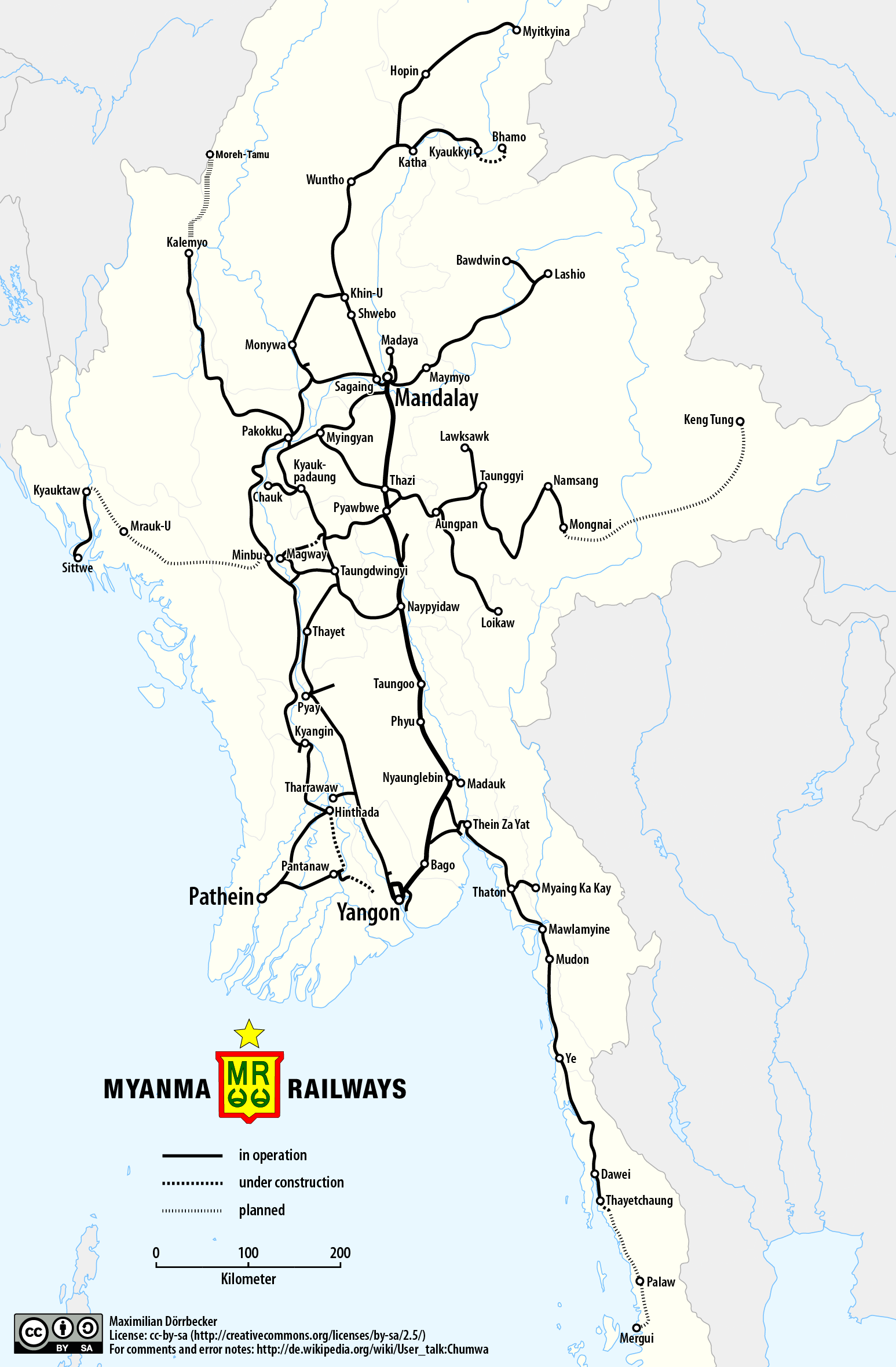
Myanmar railway map

Tinsukia-Myitkyina railway is a proposed new railway link between the existing rail stations at Tinsukia-Doom Dooma in Assam state of India and Myitkyina in Kachin State of Myanmar, by laying new rail track via Shin Bway Yang and Sumprabum. Indian Railways uses broad gauge (1,676 mm or 5 ft 6 in) and Myanmar, Thailand, Vietnam and Malaysia use narrow gauge (1 meter). In December 2017, India offered a US$1 billion line of credit to build connections to ASEAN nations.

=== Imphal-Kalaymyo railway ===
Imphal-Kalaymyo railway is a proposed new railway link between the existing rail stations at Imphal in Manipur of India and Kalay in Myanmar. Indian Railways uses broad gauge (1,676 mm or 5 ft 6 in) and Myanmar, Thailand, Vietnam and Malaysia use narrow gauge (1 meter). In December 2017, India offered a US1 billion line of credit to build connections to ASEAN nations.

=== Aizawl-Wuntho railway ===
Aizawl-Wuntho railway is a proposed new railway link between the existing railway station at Wuntho in Myanmar and by extending the under construction Bairabi–Sairang line via Aizawl-Champhai in Mizoram of India to Wuntho in Myanmar which currently goes further north up to Myitkyina towards China–Myanmar border. These are to be taken up with assistance of India's 1 billion line of credit for connections to ASEAN nations.

=== Aizawl-Kalaymyo railway ===
Aizawl-Kalaymyo railway is a proposed new railway link between the existing railway station Kalay in Myanmar and by extending the under construction Bairabi–Sairang line via Aizawl-Champhai in Mizoram of India to Kalay in Myanmar. These are to be taken up with assistance of India's 1 billion line of credit for connections to ASEAN nations.

=== Aizawl-Kyauktaw-Sittwe railway ===
Aizawl-Kyauktaw-Sittwe railway is a proposed new railway link between the existing Kyauktaw-Sittwe railway in Myanmar and by extending the under construction Bairabi–Sairang line via Aizawl-Lunglei-Lawngtlai in Mizoram of India to Sittwe Port in Myanmar developed by India. Kyauktaw to Minbu is an under construction railway to link Sittwe with the exiting Myanmar railway network. These are to be taken up with assistance of India's 1 billion line of credit for connections to ASEAN nations.

=== India-Myanmar-Thailand railway ===
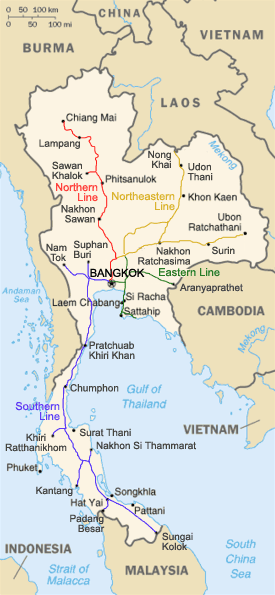
Thailand rail map

India-Myanmar-Thailand railway is a proposed new railway link, parts of which already exist, by constructing missing links between Aizawl and Imphal to Myanmar railway network and by linking existing railway lines in southern Myanmar to the Thailand rail network in 2 locations:

- Mongnai existing railway east in Myanmar to Chiang Mai in north-west Thailand
- Kyauk Shat or Dawei to Nam Tok near Bangkok

=== India-Myanmar-Thailand-Laos railway ===
India-Myanmar-Thailand-Laos railway is a proposed new railway link, parts of which already exist, by constructing missing links between Aizawl and Imphal to Myanmar railway network and Myanmar-to-Thailand to connect railway in Laos. Laos only has one railway station in the whole nation, located 20 km east of Vientiane, that was built by State Railway of Thailand during 2007-09 by extending its metre-gauge network across the First Thai–Lao Friendship Bridge from Thanaleng Railway Station in Thailand. Test trains began running on July 4, 2008, and Princess Maha Chakri Sirindhorn of Thailand formally inaugurated the line on March 5, 2009. There is also an under-construction (2017) Keng Tung railway line in east Myanmar that can be extended to Laos in future.

Laos-Vietnam railway: In 2012, an agreement for the construction of 220-kilometre $5 billion line, from Savannakhet in south Laos to Port of Vũng Ang in Vietnam, via Mụ Giạ Pass and Tan Ap (intersects Vietnam railway network), was awarded to a Malaysian company "Giant Consolidated Limited" to complete the construction from 2013 to 2017. By December 2016, installation of corridor posts along the proposed railway right-of-way was completed. In future, Savannakhet is planned to be connected to the existing railway in Thailand at Khon Kaen or Ubon Ratchathani.

=== India-Myanmar-Thailand-Cambodia railway ===
Cambodia railway map

India-Myanmar-Thailand-Cambodia railway link is a proposed new railway link, parts of which already exist, by constructing missing links between Aizawl and Imphal to Myanmar railway network, to Thailand, to Combodia to connect the rail network in Cambodia. Cambodia has existing rail link with Thailand at Poipet (Krong Poi Pet), though train services is currently suspended (2017).

=== India-Myanmar-Thailand-Cambodia-Vietnam railway ===
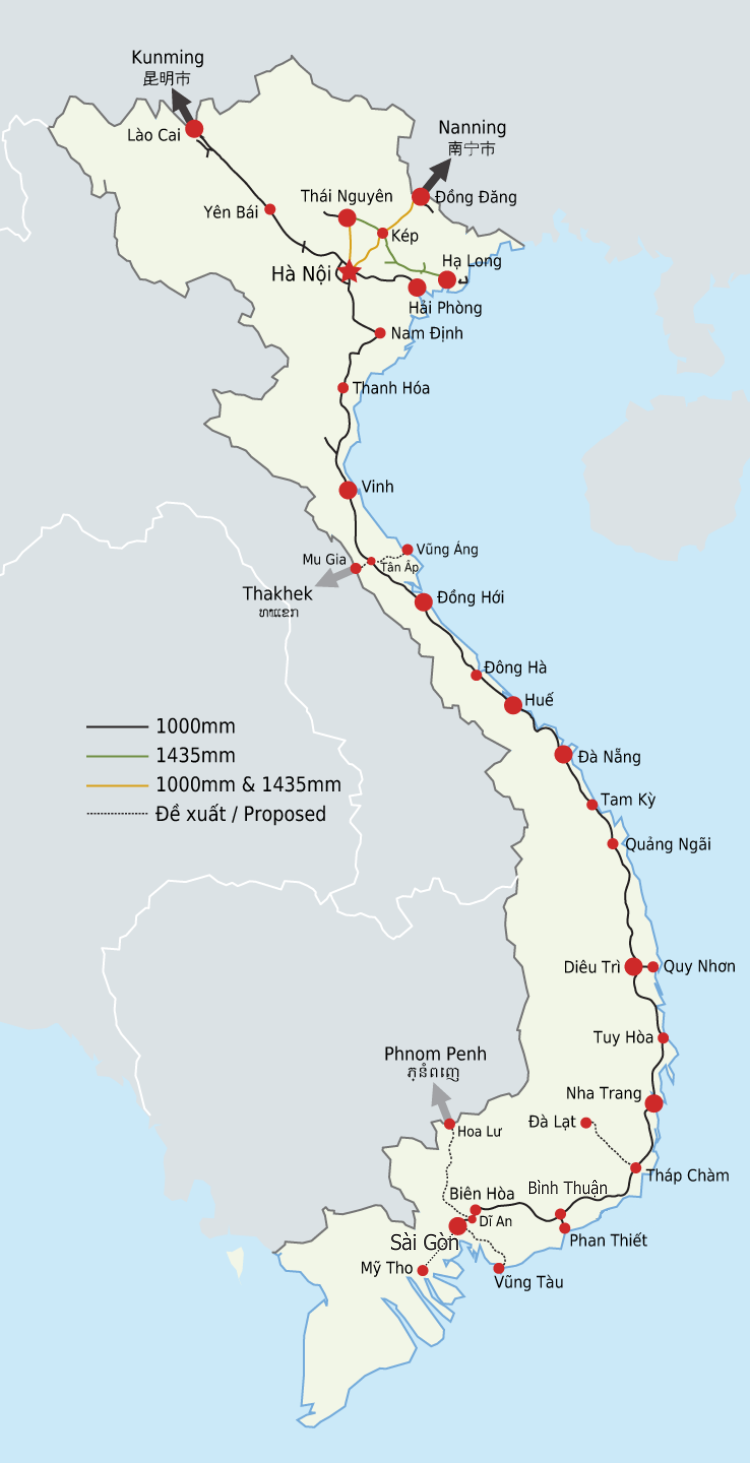
Vietnam railway map

India-Myanmar-Thailand-Cambodia-Vietnam railway is a proposed new railway link, parts of which already exist, by constructing missing links between Aizawl and Imphal to Myanmar railway network, to Thailand, to Combodia to connect Vietnam Railways. Cambodia has existing rail link with Thailand at Poipet (Krong Poi Pet) though train services is currently suspended (2017) and Phnom Penh-Hoa Lu-Dĩ An connection with Vietnam is under construction (2017), while there is no current or planned rail connection to Laos. Indian Railways uses broad gauge (1,676 mm (5 ft 6 in)) and Myanmar, Thailand, Vietnam and Malaysia use meter gauge (1,000 mm (3 ft 3 3/8 in)).

=== India-Myanmar-Thailand-Malaysia-Singapore railway ===
Malaysia railway map

India-Myanmar-Thailand-Malaysia-Singapore railway is a proposed new railway link as part of the Trans-Asian Railway, parts of which already exist, by using existing metre-gauge connections of Thai railway network to railway network in Malaysia (at Palang Besar in north west and Tumpat in north east Malaysia) and Kuala Lumpur–Singapore high-speed rail (being constructed between 2017 and 2026). Two rail crossings along the Malaysian-Thai border are:

- Padang Besar, Malaysia-Padang Besar, Thailand: Both the Malaysian and Thai towns where the crossing is located are known by the same name. This crossing connects to Malaysia's West Coast trunk line and Thailand's main southern line to Bangkok via Hat Yai. Both Malaysian and Thai customs, immigration and quarantine formalities are conducted at Malaysia's Padang Besar railway station.
- Rantau Panjang-Sungai Kolok: On the Malaysian side, this bridge crossing is on a branch line which is connected to Malaysia's East Coast line. In Thailand, the crossing is connected to the Su-ngai Kolok branch line which links up with the main southern line at Hat Yai. The crossing is currently not in use (January 2018).

=== India-Bangladesh Sabroom-Cox Bazar railway ===
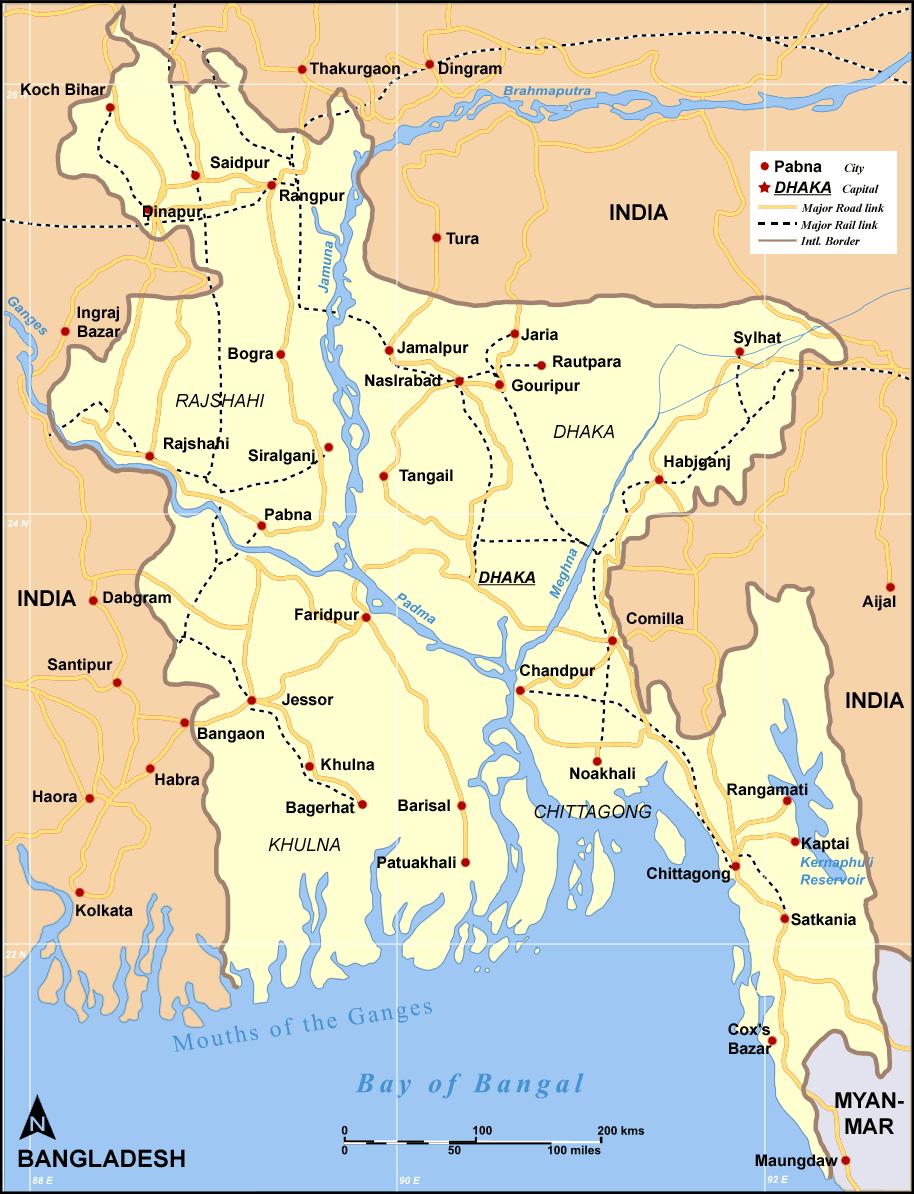
Bangladesh railway map

This will extend the existing Sabroom in south Tripura on the border of Bangladesh to Khagrachari-Rangamati-Bandarban district headquarters in the tribal areas of Chittagong Hill Tracts, joining the existing Chittagong-Satkania track at Satkania and proceeding further on the new track to the Cox's Bazar which is one of the official port for transit to India.

=== India-Bangladesh Baraiya-Zokhawtar railway ===
This will extend the existing Sabroom in south Tripura on the border of Bangladesh to Baraiya (southwest Tripura)-Chaggalnaiya (Bangladesh)-Manu Bazar (South Tripura)-Sabroom-Khargachari-Magrum-Nunsri Lunglei-Aizawl-Zokhawtar-Kalemo.

=== India-Bangladesh Bandarban-Tuiping railway ===
Route for this will be Bandarban (Bangladesh)-Tuiping (Mizoram)-Niawhtlang (Mizoram-Burma border)-Gangaw (Myanmar).

=== India-Bangladesh Shillong-Sylhet railway ===
Route for this will be Shillong and Dawki in India to Sylhet in Bangladesh.

=== India-Bangladesh Dhubri-Jaria railway ===
Route for this will be Dhubri, Tura, Barengapara and Durgapur in India to Jaria in Bangladesh.
