= Imphal railway station =

Railway station in Manipur, India

Imphal

General information
- Location: Yurembam, Manipur; India
- Coordinates: 24.765°N 93.866°E
- Elevation: 521 metres (1,709 ft)
- System: Indian Railways station
- Owner: Indian Railways
- Operator: Northeast Frontier Railway
- Line: Lumding–Imphal line
- Platforms: 2
- Tracks: 2

Construction
- Structure type: Standard (on-ground station)
- Parking: Yes
- Cycle facilities: Yes

Other information
- Status: Under-construction
- Station code: IMPAL
- Zone(s): Northeast Frontier Railway
- Division(s): Lumding

History
- Opened: December 2026 (expected)
Location

Imphal Railway station is an under-construction railway station in Imphal in Manipur, India.

== Facilities ==
The station will have two side-platforms.

== Rail lines ==
=== Trans-Asian Railway ===
Partially-complete Trans-Asian Railway (TAR), Yunnan-Kalay-Moreh-Imphal-Jiribam-Gede-Attari route passing through Imphal railway station, will enable containers from Singapore, China, Vietnam, Cambodia, India, Bangladesh, Myanmar, Thailand, and Korea to travel overland by train to Europe. Presently, all freight traffic originating from Asia destined for Europe goes by sea. The Southern Corridor of the Trans-Asian Railway is of prime interest to India. It connects Yunnan in China and Thailand with Europe via Turkey and passes through India.

As per India-Myanmar MoU, their railway networks will be interconnected via a 346-km line section that will extend from Kalay in Myanmar to Jiribam in India via the border point at Tamu / Moreh. The proposed route will enter India through Tamu and Moreh in Manipur bordering Myanmar, then enter Bangladesh through Mahisasan and Shahbajpur and again enter India from Bangladesh at Gede. On the western side, the line will enter Pakistan at Attari. There is a 315 kilometres (196 mi) missing link on this route in the India–Myanmar sector; of this, 180 kilometres (110 mi), in India, is between Jiribam in Manipur and Tamu in Myanmar. The rail link between Jiribam and Imphal has been sanctioned by Indian Railways, but that is unlikely to be completed before 2016. Construction work is in progress in a 97 kilometres (60 mi) stretch between Jiribam and Imphal.

Following lines are part of the TAR and India's Act East Policy.

=== Jiribam–Imphal line ===
==== Details ====
Jiribam–Imphal line, 111 km long railway line project costing 22,274.57 crore (2024 estimates). includes 8 new stations, 62 km of tunnels, 11 major bridges, 134 minor bridges, 4 road overbridges, and 12 road underbridges. The Jiribam–Vangaichungpao–Tupul-Imphal route will connect Imphal, the capital of Manipur to the rest of India by a rail link.

This line has twin-tube parallel tunnel. Tunnel no. 12, India's ₹ 930 crore longest tunnel with 11.55 km length between Jiribam and Imphal West, surpasses the 8.5 km Pir Panjal Railway Tunnel on the Banihal-Qazigund line as India's longest tunnel. There is a ₹ 368 crore parallel 9.35 km long safety tunnel, compliant with international technical specifications, with cross passages at every 500 meters for evacuation. Bridge no. 64, which connects to the tunnel, cost ₹ 283.5 crore.

==== Route ====
Jiribam-Imphal line has following stations, 1 existing (Jiribam) and the rest new at the time of construction:

- Jiribam railway station
- Vangaichungpao railway station, halt.
- Kamranga railway station, intermediate halt (higher classification than "halt").
- Sribar railway station, intermediate halt.
- Ranigaon railway station, intermediate halt.
- Vangaichungpao railway station, intermediate halt.
- Khongsang railway station, major station.
- Rani Gaidinliu railway station (Kaimai), major station. (Kaimai)
- Haipou Jadonang Kambiron railway station, intermediate halt.
- Noney railway station, major station near world's tallest pier bridge.
- Tupul railway station, first hill station in Manipur en route.
- Thingu railway station, intermediate halt.
- Phayeng railway station, halt.
- Imphal railway station, major station.

==== Current status ====
Current status of Jiribam-Imphal line:

- 2025 May: Out of total 111 km Jribam-Imphal line, 50% or 55.36 km Jiribam-Khongsang section was completed and operationalised in 2022, while remaining 18.25 km Khongsang-Noney and 37.02 km Noney-Imphal sections are under construction. 65% work, based on the actual budget, was complete by March 2024, with the project expected to be fully completed by December 2026 (2021 estimate).

=== Imphal-Moreh line ===
==== Details ====
Imphal-Moreh line: planned Rs 6,000 crore 111 km long future phase to India-Myanmar border at Moreh-Tamu as part of India's Act East policy, requiring tunnels or bridges in hilly areas near Tengnoupal and Myanmar border, will eventually connect to Myanmar's rail network via proposed Kalay-Kyigone-Moreh line of TAR.

==== Route ====
It has the following proposed Stations:

- Imphal (existing)
- Kakching (new)
- Pallel (new)
- Tengnoupal (new, critical hill section)
- Moreh (terminal station near border).

==== Current status ====
- 2025 Jun: Final Location Survey (FLS) was completed in March 2024. Detailed Project Report (DPR) by RITES-NFR will be ready by mid 2025 and approved by late 2025, with construction unlikely to commence before end of 2026–27.

=== Imphal-Aizawal line ===
==== Details ====
Imphal-Aizawal line, proposed ~200 km ₹ 15,000–20,000 crore+ line connecting Imphal in Manipur in north with Aizawal in Mizoram in south, will require multiple tunnels and bridges through the difficult hilly terrain.

==== Route ====
Will connect Manipur (Imphal) with Mizoram (Aizawl), route will be decided after FSL (Final Location Survey).

==== Current status ====
- 2025 Jun: Though Mizoram Government has been pushing for this line since 2018, the proposal is in preliminary planning stage only. Northeast Frontier Railway (NFR) had completed a Preliminary Survey (PS) in 2022–2023 but since then there is no progress as FSL and final alignment finalization have not been conducted, hence Detailed Project Report (DPR) could not be prepared because the Railway Ministry has classified this as a "long-term project", i.e. not in immediate 2024–2030 infrastructure plans due to the lack of political will at central government level. If the Indian government decides to expedite the project, the DPR completion could be likely by 2026–2027 and earliest commencement of construction would be likely by 2030, but more realistically after 2035 unless this line is declared a special National Strategic Project before that.

=== Imphal-Kohima line ===
==== Details ====
Kohima-Imphal line, proposed ~220 km ₹ 25,000+ crore line will run through Patkai mointain ranage and require 50+ tunnels.

==== Route ====
Will connect Kohima, the capital of Nagaland, with Imphal, the capita of Manipur,. route will be decided after FSL (Final Location Survey).

==== Current status ====
- 2025 Jun: proposed but not yet surveyed as it is still in the pre-feasibility stage, hence likely to see progress after 2030.

=== Imphal-Agartala line ===
==== Details ====
Imphal-Agartala line, proposed ~350 km ₹ 20,000+ crore direct line through Barak Valley and tribal areas is mentioned in "Northeast Vision 2040" documents as a long-term goal.

==== Route ====
Will connect Imphal, the capital of Manipur, with Agartala, the capital of Tripura along Imphal-Churachandpur-Tipaimukh- Jiribam/Silchar-Agartala route, route will be decided after FSL (Final Location Survey).

==== Current status ====
- 2025 Jun: proposed but not yet surveyed as it is still in the pre-feasibility stage.

== See also ==
- North Eastern Railway Connectivity Project
- Northeast Frontier Railway zone
