= Guwahati–Sairang Express =

Train in India

Guwahati - Sairang Express

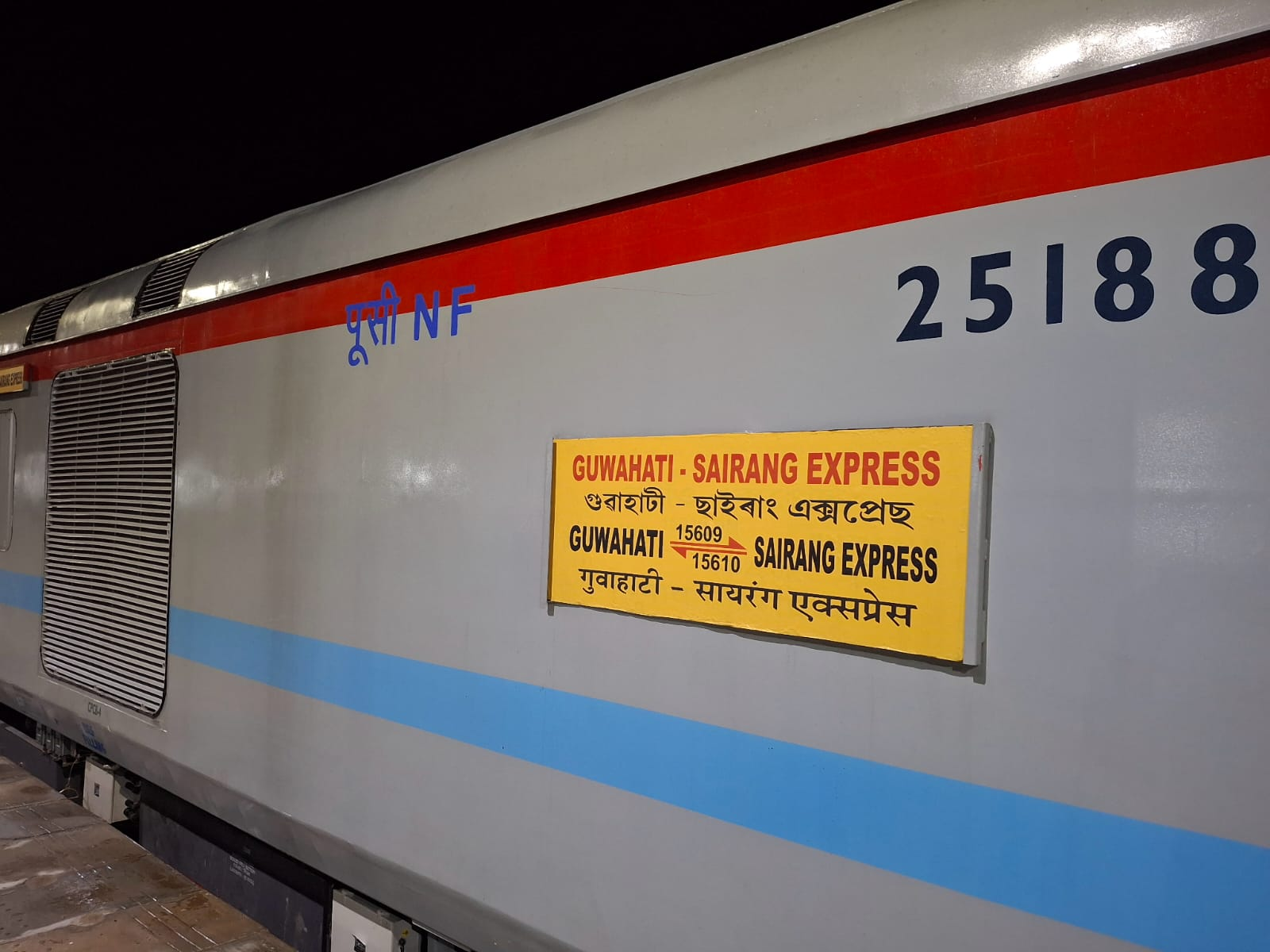
- Guwahati - Sairang Express train board.

Overview
- Service type: Express
- Status: Active
- Locale: Assam and Mizoram
- First service: 13 September 2025; 14 months ago (Inaugural); 15 September 2025; 14 months ago (Commercial)
- Current operator: Northeast Frontier (NFR)

Route
- Termini: Guwahati (GHY); Sairang (SANG)
- Stops: 13
- Distance travelled: 493 km (306 mi)
- Average journey time: 13 hrs 30 mins
- Service frequency: Daily
- Train number: 15609 / 15610
- Lines used: Guwahati–Lumding line; Lumding–Badarpur line; Bairabi–Sairang line

On-board services
- Classes: General Unreserved, Sleeper Class, AC 2 Tier, AC 3 Tier
- Seating arrangements: Yes
- Sleeping arrangements: Yes
- Catering facilities: No
- Observation facilities: Large windows
- Baggage facilities: No
- Other facilities: Below the seats

Technical
- Rolling stock: LHB coach
- Track gauge: 1,676 mm (5 ft 6 in)
- Operating speed: 120 km/h (75 mph) maximum, 37 km/h (23 mph) average including halts.

The 15609 / 15610 Guwahati–Sairang Express is an express train belonging to Northeast Frontier Railway zone that runs between the city Guwahati of Assam and Sairang, the Aizawl District of Mizoram in India.

The train was inaugurated on 13 September 2025 via video conference by Prime Minister, Narendra Modi from Aizawl District of Mizoram in India.

== Service ==
- 15609 / Guwahati–Sairang Express has an average speed of 37 km/h and covers 493 km in 13h 30m.
- 15610 / Sairang–Guwahati Express has an average speed 37 km/h and covers 493 km in 13h 30m.

== Routes and halts ==
Guwahati – Sairang Express (Mail/Express)
15609 Guwahati → Sairang					15610 Sairang → Guwahati				
Sr.	Station	Day	Arrival	Departure	Sr.	Station	Day	Arrival	Departure
1	Guwahati	1	–	19:00	1	Sairang	1	–	19:00
2	Jagi Road	1	19:58	20:00	2	Bhairabi	1	19:48	19:50
3	Chaparmukh Junction	1	20:28	20:30	3	Hailakandi	1	20:58	21:00
4	Hojai	1	21:06	21:08	4	Katakhal Junction	1	21:30	21:32
5	Lumding Junction	1	22:10	22:20	5	Badarpur Junction	1	22:10	22:20
6	Maibang	2	00:05	00:07	6	New Harangajao	1	23:50	23:52
7	New Haflong	2	01:30	01:32	7	New Haflong	2	00:40	00:42
8	New Harangajao	2	02:20	02:22	8	Maibang	2	01:55	01:57
9	Badarpur Junction	2	04:00	04:10	9	Lumding Junction	2	04:20	04:30
10	Katakhal Junction	2	05:00	05:02	10	Hojai	2	05:25	05:27
11	Hailakandi	2	05:30	05:32	11	Chaparmukh Junction	2	06:00	06:02
12	Bhairabi	2	06:40	06:42	12	Jagi Road	2	06:40	06:42
13	Sairang	2	08:30	–	13	Guwahati	2	08:30	–

== Schedule ==
Train schedule: Guwahati ↔ Sairang Express
Train no.	Station code	Departure station	Departure time	Arrival station	Arrival time	Arrival Hours
15609	GHY	Guwahati	7:00 PM	Sairang	8:30 AM	13h 30m
15134	SANG	Sairang	7:00 PM	Guwahati	8:30 AM	13h 30m

== Coach composition ==
Train Coach: Guwahati ↔ Sairang Express
Sl. No	General Unreserved	Sleeper Class	AC 3rd Class	AC 2nd Class	Engine
1.	4	1	6	4	1

== Traction ==
To be announced.

== Reversals ==
The train will reverse direction in two places:

- Lumding Junction
- Badarpur Junction

== See also ==
Trains from Guwahati:

- Guwahati–Jorhat Town Jan Shatabdi Express
- Guwahati–Dibrugarh Shatabdi Express
- Guwahati–Dullabcherra Express
- Guwahati–Chennai Egmore Express
- Guwahati–Bengaluru Cantt. Superfast Express

Trains from Sairang:

- Sairang–Anand Vihar Terminal Rajdhani Express
- Kolkata–Sairang Express

== Notes ==
a. Runs daily in a week with both directions.
