= Silchar–Bhairabi Passenger =

Train in India

Silchar - Bhairabi Passenger
Overview
- Service type: Passenger
- First service: 28 May 2016; 9 years ago
- Current operator: Northeast Frontier Railway

Route
- Termini: Silchar (SCL); Bairabi (BHRB)
- Stops: 12
- Distance travelled: 103 km (64 mi)
- Average journey time: 4h 15m
- Service frequency: Six days in week.
- Train number: 55667/55668

On-board services
- Class: Unreserved
- Seating arrangements: Yes
- Sleeping arrangements: No
- Catering facilities: No
- Entertainment facilities: No

Technical
- Rolling stock: 1
- Track gauge: 1,676 mm (5 ft 6 in)
- Operating speed: 25 km/h (16 mph)

Silchar - Bhairabi Passenger is a passenger express train of the Indian Railways connecting Silchar in Assam and Bairabi in Mizoram. It is currently operated with the 55667/55668 train numbers on a daily basis. Bairabi is only the railhead of Mizoram and is connected with a broad gauge line.

== Service ==
The 55667/Silchar - Bhairabi Passenger has an average speed of 25 km/h and covers 103 km in 4 hrs 15 mins. 55668/Bhairabi - Silchar Passenger has an average speed of 25 km/h and covers 56 km in 4 hrs 10 mins.

== Route and halts ==
- Silchar
- Arunachal Junction
- Salchapra
- Katakhal Junction
- Algapur
- Hailakandi
- Monacherra
- Lalabazar
- Mahamadpur Assam
- Katlicherra
- Manipur Bagan
- Jamira
- Ramnathpur
- Bairabi

== Traction ==
The train is hauled by a Siliguri Loco Shed based WDP-4 diesel locomotive.

== Coach composite ==
The train consist of 12 coaches :

- 10- General
- 2 Second-class Luggage/parcel van

Loco	1	2	3	4	5	6	7	8	9	10	11	12
	SLR	GS	GS	GS	GS	GS	GS	GS	GS	GS	GS	SLR

== Direction Reversal ==
Train Reverses its direction 1 times:

- Katakhal Junction

== Rake Maintenance ==
The train is maintained by the Silchar Coaching Depot. The same rake is used for Silchar - Vangaichangpo Passenger.

== See also ==
- Silchar railway station
- Bairabi railway station
- Silchar - Jiribam Passenger
- Bairabi Sairang Railway
