= Sairang railway station =

Railway station in Mizoram, India

Sairang
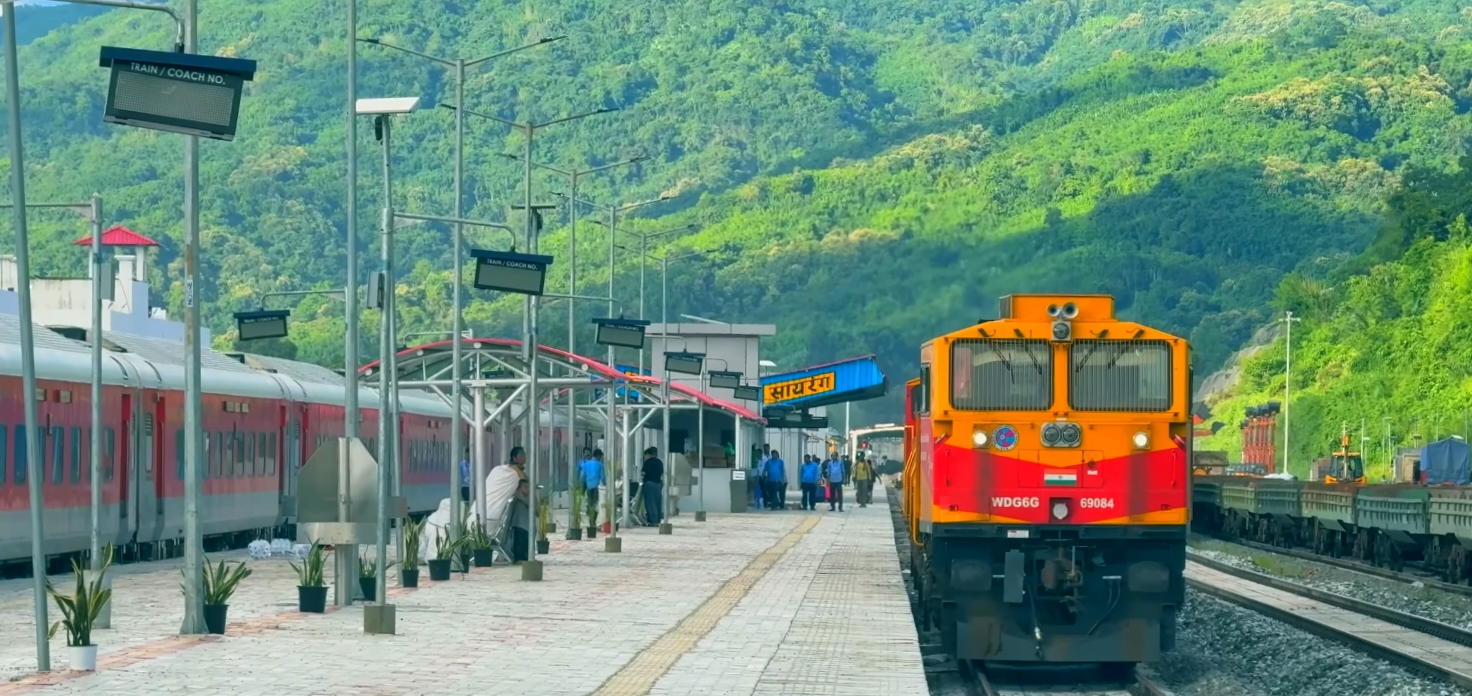
- Sairang Railway Station

General information
- Location: Sairang, Aizawl district, Mizoram; India
- Coordinates: 23°47′56″N 92°39′08″E
- System: Indian Railways station
- Owner: Indian Railways
- Operator: Northeast Frontier Railway zone
- Line: Bairabi–Sairang line
- Platforms: 3
- Tracks: 4

Construction
- Structure type: Standard (on-ground station)
- Parking: Yes

Other information
- Status: Completed
- Station code: SANG
- Zone(s): Northeast Frontier Railway

History
- Opened: 13 September 2025
- Electrified: Under progress
Location

Sairang railway station (station code:- SANG), is railway station in Aizawl district of Mizoram, India. The project approved in 2008–2009 financial year by the Indian central government was started in 2015, and completed in 2025. It serves Aizawl, the capital city of the Indian state of Mizoram. Aizawl now has a direct railway station and it is the fourth capital city in Northeast India to have a railway station after Guwahati, Itanagar and Agartala.

== History ==
The Sairang Railway Station was developed as part of the Bairabi–Sairang railway line, a 51.38 km broad-gauge project connecting Bairabi town in Kolasib district in the state of Mizoram to Sairang, approximately 15 km from Aizawl, the capital of Mizoram. Initially proposed in 1998, the project received formal approval from the Indian government in 2008–09 and was declared a National Project to expedite its completion. Construction commenced in November 2014, with the foundation stone for Sairang station laid by then-Railway Minister Suresh Prabhu on 11 November 2016.

The project faced significant challenges, including difficult terrain, limited working seasons, and a tragic bridge collapse in August 2023, which resulted in the loss of 26 lives. Despite these setbacks, the line was successfully completed and received Commissioner of Railway Safety (CRS) authorization in June 2025, marking a major milestone in connecting Mizoram's capital to the national railway network.

On September 13, 2025, the station was officially inaugurated by the Prime Minister of India, Narendra Modi. With the opening of the station, several new passenger services commenced, including the Aizawl–Delhi Rajdhani Express, Aizawl–Kolkata Express and Aizawl–Guwahati Express, significantly enhancing regional connectivity.

== Major trains ==
The train which originates from Sairang are :

● Kolkata–Sairang Express (13125/13126)

● Guwahati–Sairang Express (15609/15610)

● Sairang–Anand Vihar Terminal Rajdhani Express (20507/20508)

● Sairang–Silchar Passenger (55669/55670)

== Gallery ==
to be publish.

== See also ==
- List of railway stations in India
- AC Express (Indian Railways)
- Premium train
- Vande Bharat Express
- Antyodaya Express

== Notes ==
a. A new railway station situated in the state of Mizoram in Aizwal district in India.
