= Noney Railway Bridge =

- Coordinates: 24.769°N 93.558°E
- Carries: Single-track broad gauge railway (Jiribam–Imphal line)
- Crosses: Ijei River
- Locale: Noney district, Manipur, India
- Owner: Indian Railways

Characteristics
- Design: Multi-span pier bridge
- Material: Reinforced concrete (piers), steel girders (superstructure)
- Total length: 703 m
- Width: 8.5 m
- Height: 141 m (pier height)
- Longest span: 8 spans (girder-launched)

History
- Constructed by: Northeast Frontier Railway / contractors
- Construction start: 2014
- Construction end: Girder launching completed May 2025; overall commissioning pending

Location
- Interactive map of Noney Railway Bridge

The Noney Railway Bridge or the Noney Bridge, officially known as the Bridge Number 164, is the world's tallest railway pier bridge which is under construction and is located in the Noney district of Manipur, India. It is located in the Jiribam-Imphal railway line, which is an 111 kilometres long railway line that will connect Imphal to India's broad-gauge rail network. After it is fully done, it will surpass the existing record of the 139 m (456 ft) high Mala Rijeka Viaduct of Montenegro.

== Location ==
The bridge crosses the Ijei River in Noney district, Manipur, between the areas of Khumji and Karuangmuan. It lies on the route of the Jiribam-Imphal line operated by Northeast Frontier Railway.

== History and construction ==
This bridge is part of the national priority project to connect Imphal to the rest of India by rail. The Northeast Frontier Railway (NFR) and other contractors are handling the construction as part of the 111 km Jiribam-Imphal project.

By March 2024, local reports suggested an October 2024 target for completing major work. The girder launching, which involves putting up the superstructure spans, was completed in late May 2025.

In October 2025, the Governor of Manipur visited the site as the bridge approached the final stages of construction. State and railway officials reported ongoing work and activities for final commissioning.

== Design and specifications ==
- Pier height: The bridge's piers, especially P3 and P4 mentioned in reports, rise to about 141 meters.
- Overall length and width: The bridge is about 703 meters long and about 8.5 meters wide.
- Superstructure: The bridge contains several steel-girder spans that were launched or built between the high reinforced concrete piers. The final girder launches were completed in 2025.

== Significance ==
The Noney Bridge is a major engineering milestone for Indian Railways and for northeastern India because it:

- Enables the rail link to Imphal. This improves strategic connectivity, passenger travel, and freight flow for Manipur and nearby states.
- It shows the ability to construct complex bridges in steep terrain, including the Himalayan foothills and deep river valley conditions.

== See also ==
- List of railway bridges and viaducts
- Noney railway station
