= Mizoram bridge collapse =

Railway bridge collapse in India

- Date: 23 August 2023
- Time: 09:30 IST
- Location: Bairabi–Sairang line, Sairang, Mizoram, India
- Cause: bridge collapse
- Outcome: 26 labourers killed

On 23 August 2023, an under-construction railway bridge collapsed in northeastern Mizoram state of India. At least 26 labourers working on the site were killed in the accident that took place around 9:30 a.m. local time at Sairang, a town about 20 kilometers (12 miles) from Aizawl, the state capital.

The National Disaster Response Force was called to the scene to search for survivors.

According to the Northeast Frontier Railway, the accident occurred during work on the Bhairbi-Sairang New Line Railway Project. According to them, the construction was a project of the central government's railways ministry.

The Chief Minister of Mizoram Zoramthanga extended his condolences to all the bereaved families and wished a speedy recovery to the injured.

The Prime Minister's Office of India announced an ex-gratia of Rs. 200,000 from Prime Minister's National Relief Fund to be given to the next of kin of each deceased and Rs. 50,000 for the injured.
