= Noney railway station =

Proposed railway station in Manipur, India

Noney

General information
- Location: Sagolband Road, Noney, Manipur; India
- Coordinates: 24.859°N 93.633°E
- Elevation: 521 metres (1,709 ft)
- System: Indian Railways station
- Owner: Indian Railways
- Operator: Northeast Frontier Railway
- Line: Jiribam–Imphal railway line
- Platforms: 2
- Tracks: 3

Construction
- Structure type: Standard (on-ground station)
- Parking: No
- Cycle facilities: No

Other information
- Status: Under-construction
- Station code: NONEY
- Zone(s): Northeast Frontier Railway
- Division(s): Lumding

History
- Opened: TBA
Location

Noney railway station is a proposed railway station in Noney district, Manipur. The code of the railway station is "NONEY" and it will serve the Noney town. The station proposal includes two platforms.

It is near the soon-to-be world's tallest railway pier bridge, Noney Railway Bridge.

The work on this railway line was expected to be finished in the year 2019.

== See also ==
- Imphal railway station
- Jiribam railway station
- List of railway stations in India
