= Bairabi railway station =

Railway station in Mizoram, India

Bairabi

General information
- Location: National Highway, Kolasib, Mizoram; India
- Coordinates: 24.1960°N 92.5412°E
- Elevation: 48 metres (157 ft)
- System: Indian Railways station
- Owner: Indian Railways
- Lines: Bairabi–Sairang line Katakhal–Bairabi line
- Platforms: 3
- Tracks: 4
- Connections: Auto stand

Construction
- Structure type: Standard (on-ground station)
- Platform levels: At ground
- Parking: No
- Cycle facilities: No
- Accessible: Yes

Other information
- Status: Active
- Station code: BHRB
- Fare zone: Northeast Frontier Railway zone

History
- Opened: 1899
- Closed: 2013
- Rebuilt: 2016
Location
- Location within Mizoram

Bairabi railway station serves Bairabi city in Kolasib district, Mizoram. Its code is BHRB. The station consists of 3 platforms. Bairabi is one of the railhead of Mizoram and connected with a broad-gauge line. The 84.25 km broad-gauge railway line from Katakhal Junction to Bairabi, was completed on 21 March 2016.

== Future development plans ==
- Bairabi Sairang Railway is an ongoing railway line project from Bairabi station to Sairang railway station near Aizawl with an estimated cost of Rs 2,384 crore. An estimated 28 hectares (69 acres) of land is required for the construction of 51 kilometres (32 mi) long Bairabi-Sairang rail line. The Bairabi-Sairang rail link will require construction of 130 bridges, 23 tunnels and four stations namely Hortoki, Kawnpui, Mualkhang and Sairang. The cost of Construction from Bairabi to Sairang is estimated at 2384 Crores. As of August 2019, the 60% work is complete, and the revised expected deadline is December 2021.
- Future line development plan entails extending the line from Aizawl to south to Zochawchhuah (India)-Zorinpui (Myanmar) on the India–Myanmar border, from where it will then be extended to 90 km-long "Sittwe-Kyaukhtu railway to connect it to Sittwe Port as part of Kaladan Multi-Modal Transit Transport Project. "Zochawchhuah(Zorinpui)-Sairang railway" in India, survey for the 375 km line rail line from Sairang (Aizawl) to Hmawngbuchhuah on border near Zochawchhuah–Zorinpui was completed in August 2017 and it will be constructed in future phase. Kyaukhtu–Zorinpui railway line is 200 km long planned but not yet surveyed line.
- Other future extension spur is from Aizawl to east of Zokhawthar. Future line development plan entails extending the line from Imphal to Moreh on the India–Myanmar border, from where it will then be extended to the existing railhead at Kalay (also called Kale and Kalemyo) in Myanmar to form part of the ambitious Trans-Asian Railway.

== Platforms ==
There are a total of 3 platforms and 4 tracks. The platforms are connected by foot overbridge. These platforms are built to accumulate 24 coaches express train.

=== Station layout ===
G	Street level	Exit/Entrance & ticket counter
P1	FOB, Side platform, No-1 doors will open on the left/right
P1	Track 1
P1	Track 2
P1	Track 3
P1	FOB, Island platform, No- 2 doors will open on the left/right
P1	Track 4

== See also ==
- Kolasib district
- Sairang Railway Station
- Lumding railway division
- Rail transport in India
- List of railway stations in India
