= Teirei =

River in Mizoram, India

Coordinates: 24°10′49″N 92°32′04″E

The Teirei is a river of Mizoram, northeastern India, a tributary of the Tlawng River.
