= Tut River =

River in Mizoram, India

Coordinates: 24°02′N 92°32′E

The Tut is a river of Mizoram, northeastern India. It is a tributary of the Tlawng River.
