= Tlawng Dam =

Dam in Lungleng, India

- Location within Mizoram Location within India
- Country: India
- Location: Lungleng
- Coordinates: 23°38′10.77″N 092°39′04.38″E
- Status: Proposed

Dam and spillways
- Type of dam: Embankment, rock-fill
- Impounds: Tlawng River
- Height: 123 m (404 ft)
- Length: 245 m (804 ft)
- Elevation at crest: 243 m (797 ft)
- Spillway type: Chute spillway
- Spillway capacity: 4,825 m^{3}/s (170,393 cu ft/s)

Reservoir
- Total capacity: 42,500,000 m^{3} (34,455 acre⋅ft)
- Active capacity: 22,680,000 m^{3} (18,387 acre⋅ft)
- Catchment area: 925 km^{2} (357 mi^{2})
- Normal elevation: 240 m (787 ft)

Power Station
- Turbines: 2 x 22.5 MW Francis-type
- Installed capacity: 55 MW

Tlawng Dam, is a proposed rock-fill dam on the Tlawng River near Lungleng, 25 km from Aizawl, in the state of Mizoram in India.

== History ==
A memorandum of understanding was signed between the Mizoram Government and Shyam Century Ferrous on 10 August 2012.

In 2014, the Union Ministry of Water Resources provided the Central Water Commission with Rs 11.55 crore to survey and investigate the hydro-electrical project. This work then started in February 2015.

In 2024, F. Rodingliana, Mizoram’s Minister of State for Power and Electricity, expressed his confidence construction would start the following year.

Preliminary survey results situate the dam close to North Lungleng in Aizawl district. The dam would extend to Ramlaitui in Lunglei district. 2,888 hectares of uncultivable land and 187 hectares of cultivable land would be submerged by the dam’s 1,009.6 million cubic meters of water. 120 megawatt capacity would be provided by the 120-meter-high dam.

== See also ==
- Lungleng River
