= Bairabi =

- Census Town
- Location within Mizoram Location within India
- Coordinates: 24.2359°N 92.5213°E
- Country: India
- State: Mizoram
- District: Kolasib

Population (2001)
  - Total: 3,304

Languages
  - Official: Mizo
- Time zone: UTC+5:30 (IST)
- Vehicle registration: MZ
- Website: mizoram.nic.in

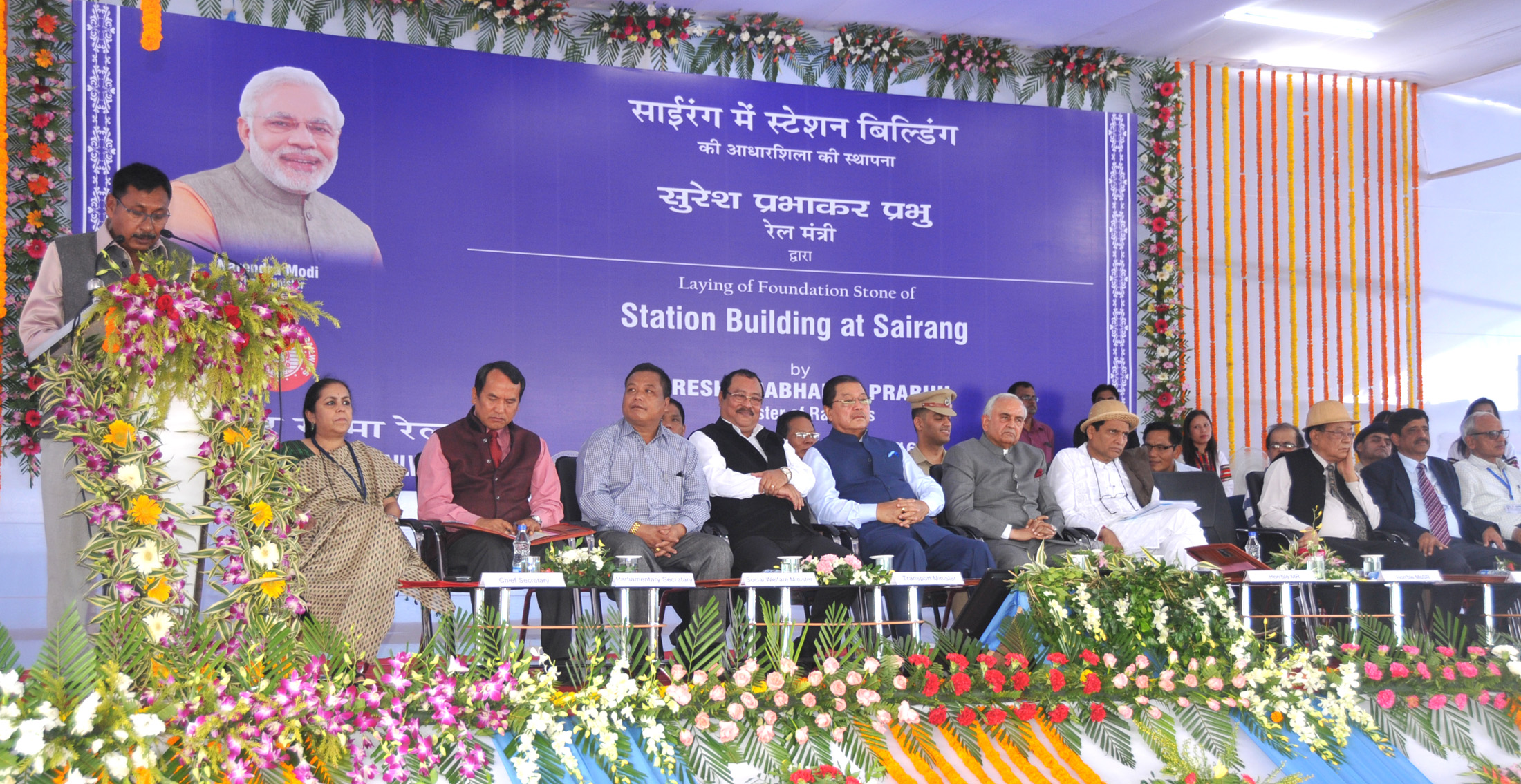
The Minister of State for Railways, Shri Rajen Gohain addressing the gathering at the foundation stone laying ceremony of Sairang Station building of Bairabi-Sairang New line Project, at Sairang, in Aizawl, Mizoram on November 11, 2016

Bairabi is a census town in Kolasib district in the state of Mizoram, India.

== Demographics ==
As of the 2011 Census of India, Bairabi had a population of 4,320.

== Connectivity ==
Bairabi was the only major railhead of Mizoram until 2025, when Bairabi-Sairang line was inaugurated. The Katakhal-Bairabi metre-gauge track was converted to broad gauge. After receiving the status of national project, it was fast-tracked and completed on 21 March 2016. Presently, the daily 05567/05568 Passenger Special between Silchar and Bairabi connects the two towns in about 3 hours and 30 minutes.

== Economy ==
The main employers in Bairabi besides Agriculture are :

1. Food Corporation of India Godown(F.C.I) Store house of Food Supplies
2. Bairabi Thermal Power Station - Heavy Fuel Oil Based producing 22.92MW
3. Modern Brick Industry, Bairabi.
4. Bairabi Dam.
5. Bairabi Sairang Railway line from Bairabi to Sairang, a town near Aizawl.
