= Silchar–Jiribam Passenger =

Train in India

Silchar - Jiribam Passenger
Overview
- Service type: Passenger
- First service: 28 May 2016; 9 years ago
- Current operator: Northeast Frontier Railway

Route
- Termini: Silchar (SCL); Jiribam (JRBM)
- Stops: 7
- Distance travelled: 56 km (35 mi)
- Average journey time: 2h 15m
- Service frequency: twice a week
- Train number: 55665/55666

On-board services
- Class: Unreserved
- Seating arrangements: Yes
- Sleeping arrangements: No
- Catering facilities: No
- Entertainment facilities: No

Technical
- Rolling stock: 1
- Track gauge: 1,676 mm (5 ft 6 in)
- Operating speed: 25 km/h (16 mph)

Silchar - Jiribam Passenger is a Passenger express train of the Indian Railways connecting Silchar in Assam and Jiribam in Manipur. It is currently being operated with 55665/55666 train numbers on twice a day basis. This train is only trains service to Manipur.

== Service ==
The 55665/Silchar - Jiribam Passenger has an average speed of 25 km/h and covers 56 km in 2 hrs 15 mins. 55666/Jiribam - Silchar Passenger has an average speed of 25 km/h and covers 56 km in 2 hrs 15 mins.

== Route and halts ==
- Silchar
- Arunachal Junction
- New Silchar
- Moinarband
- Ranigaon
- Shribar
- Kamranga
- Jirighat
- Jiribam

== Traction ==
Both trains are hauled by a Siliguri Loco Shed based WDP-4 diesel locomotive.

== Coach composite ==
The train consists of 7 coaches :

- 6 General
- 1 Second-class Luggage/parcel van

== Direction Reversal ==
Train Reverses its direction 1 times:

- Arunachal Junction

== Rake Maintenance ==
The train is maintained by the Silchar Coaching Depot. The same rake is also use for Silchar - Bhairabi Passenger.

== See also ==
- Silchar railway station
- Jiribam railway station
- Silchar - Bhairabi Passenger
