= Tlawng =

Coordinates: 24°52′N 92°36′E

Tlawng River
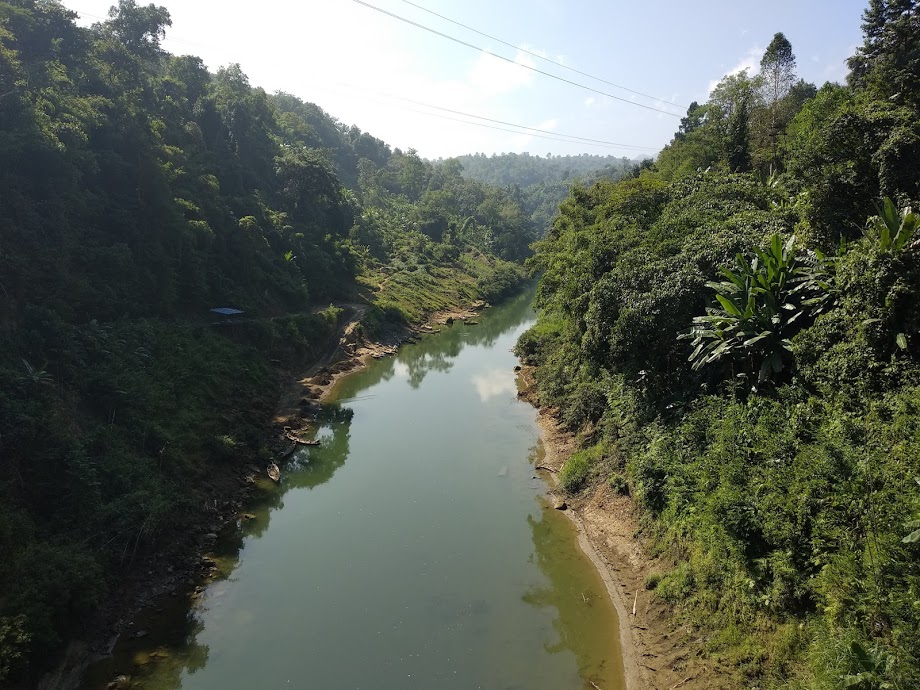
- Tlawng, water source for Aizawl, Mizoram

Location
- Country: India
- State: Mizoram, Assam
- Cities: Aizawl, Lunglei

Physical characteristics
- Source
  - elevation: 1,398 m (4,587 ft)
- Mouth
  - location: Zopui Hill
- Length: 185.5 km (115.3 mi)

Basin features
- Tributaries
  - left: Tut
  - right: Teirei

The Tlawng is a river of Mizoram, northeastern India. Its tributaries include the Tut, Teirei and the Ngashih. The city of Aizawl is situated to the east of the Tlawng river.

In 2012, a dam (Tlawng Dam) was proposed for the river.

== History ==
In 1890, when the British came to Mizoram, the Tlawng river was the main means of transportation from Silchar. Sairang on the river banks of Tlawng, is the nearest town from Aizawl (about 14 kilometres away). The journey of about 140 kilometres from Sairang to Silchar used to take about 15–30 days depending upon the season and water level on a flat water boat.

== Geography ==
The Tlawng River is one of the longest rivers in Mizoram, measuring 234 km in length (Distance) or 185.50 km net displacement (a straight line) (as of 23.9.2015) Between Zobawk village near Lunglei Town to Bairabi (Mizoram Border) It originates in Zopui Hill (Near Zobawk) some 8 kilometres (5 mi) east of Lunglei at an elevation of 1,395 metres (4,577 ft). After the confluence with Tut and Teirei River it eventually enters Cachar District. It is navigable by small boat up to Sairang.

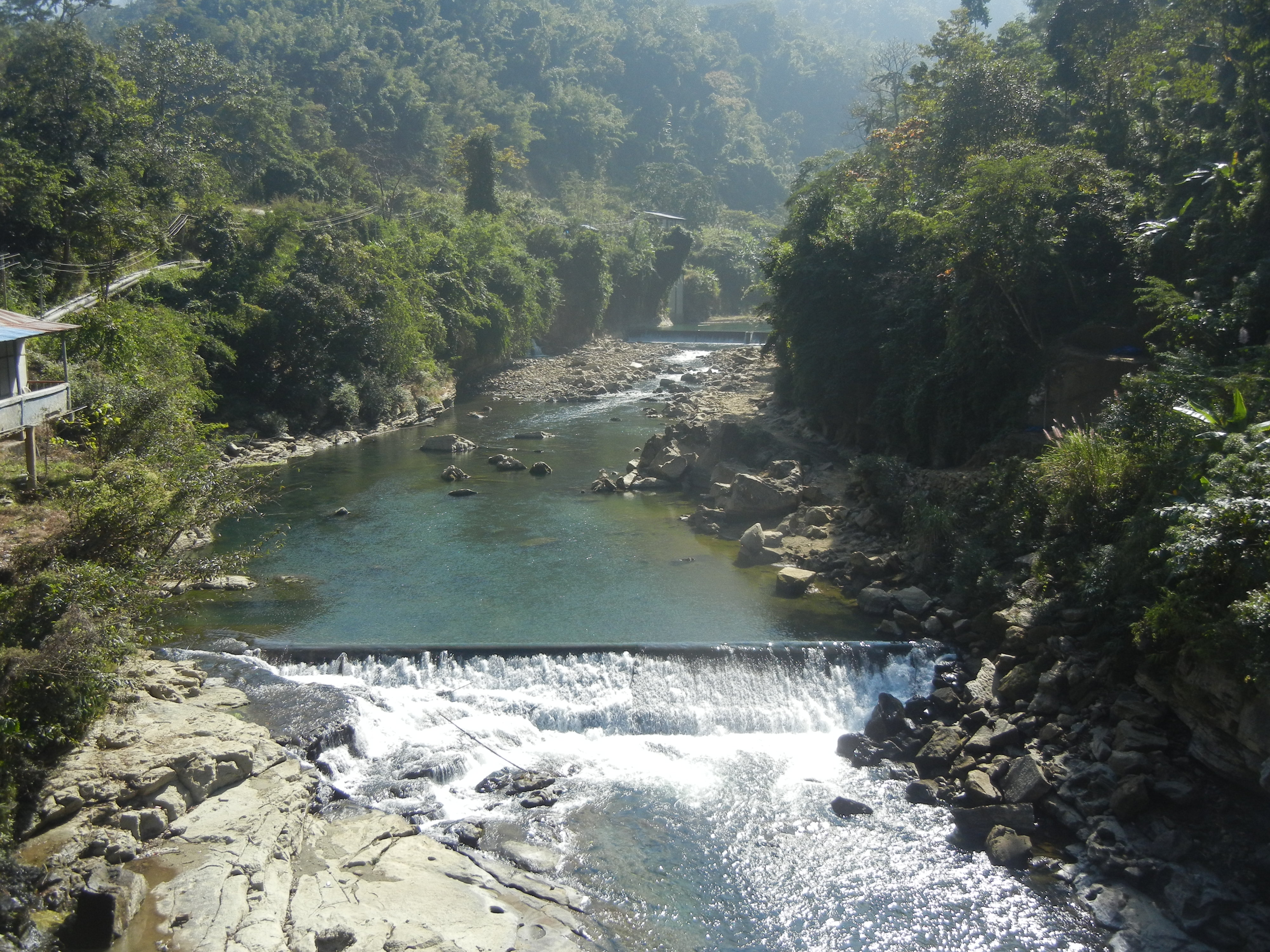
Tlawng river Drinking water source
