= Ganol River =

Ganol River Kalu
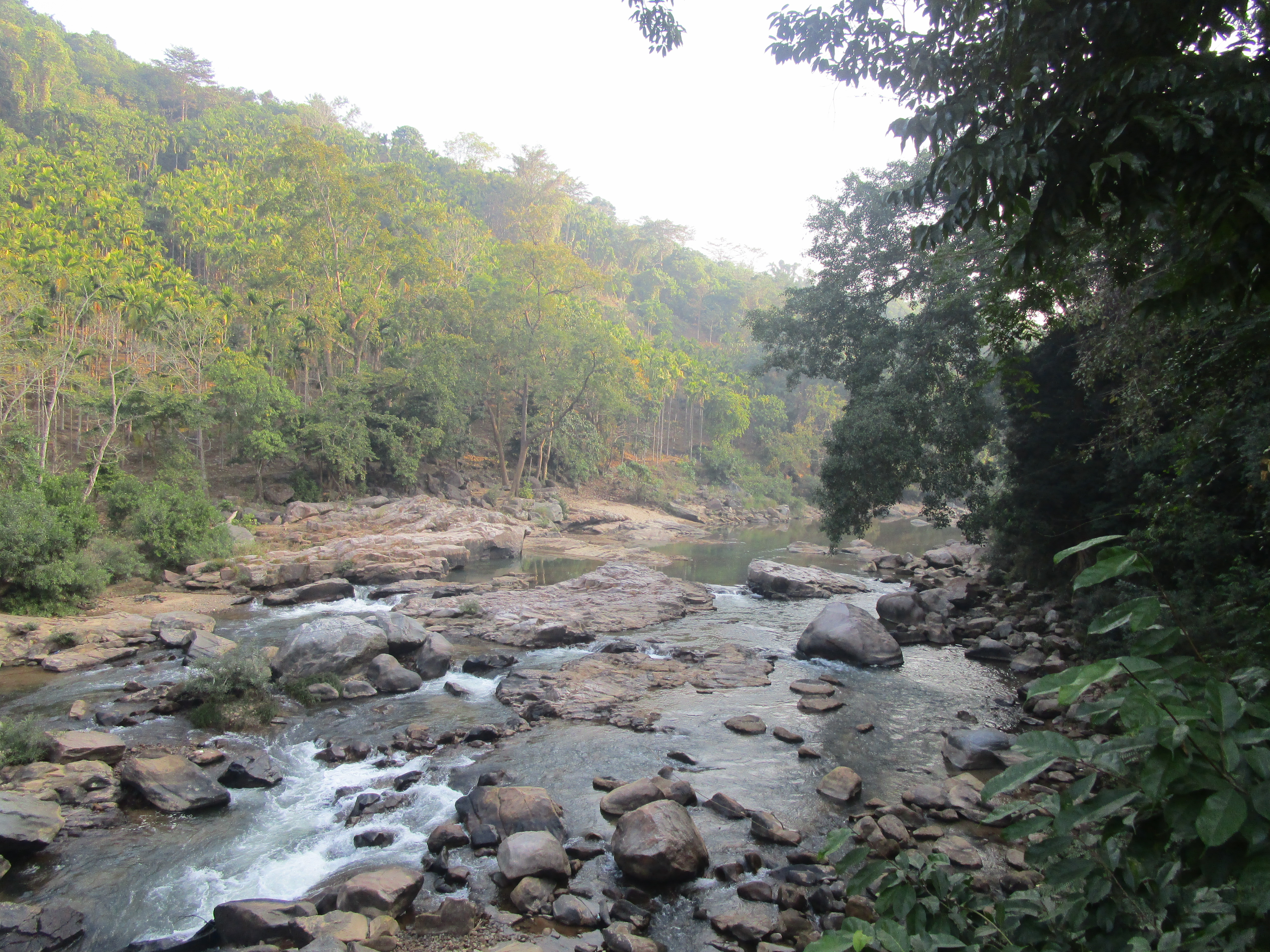

Location
- Country: India
- State: Meghalaya
- District: West Garo Hills

Physical characteristics
- Length: 50 kilometres

The Ganol River is a river flowing through the West Garo Hills district in the Indian state of Meghalaya. The river originates at the Tura Peak in the Garo Hills and flows toward the west. It is approximately 50 kilometers long and has a winding course. People locally call the river Kalu. Its main tributaries include the Dilni and Rongram rivers.

The Ganol River forms part of the Nokrek National Park and the Nokrek Biosphere Reserve. Leptobrachella nokrekensis, also known as Nokrek's spadefoot toad, has only been found in the Ganol River within the reserve.

In 2020, the Mandal Wari Fish Sanctuary was created in a stretch of the river at Ganol A'pal, near Tura. The sanctuary is intended to be maintained by local people and to support populations of six varieties of mahseer in the region.

As well as being high in biodiversity, the Ganol River is an important water source for the local population, providing water for drinking, washing, irrigation and domestic purposes. It is also a popular area for recreation, with picnickers and anglers visiting the Pelga Falls and Chibragre.

The Ganol Small Hydro Power Project is a hydroelectric power plant on the river with three units, producing an estimated 65 gigawatt-hours of energy per year. The project was begun in 2014, inaugurated in January 2023 and had all three units in operation by July 2023. The lake created by the plant's dam also draws tourists to the area.

Pollution is a serious threat to the river's ecosystem. A study published in 2024 showed that the water quality had declined continuously between 2014 and 2020. Commercial and domestic waste dumped into the river not only damages the natural environment, but also risks damaging the hydroelectric plant. The local government has tried to solve the problem with awareness campaigns and cleanup work.
