= Sairang–Anand Vihar Terminal Rajdhani Express =

Train in India

Sairang - Anand Vihar Terminal Rajdhani Express

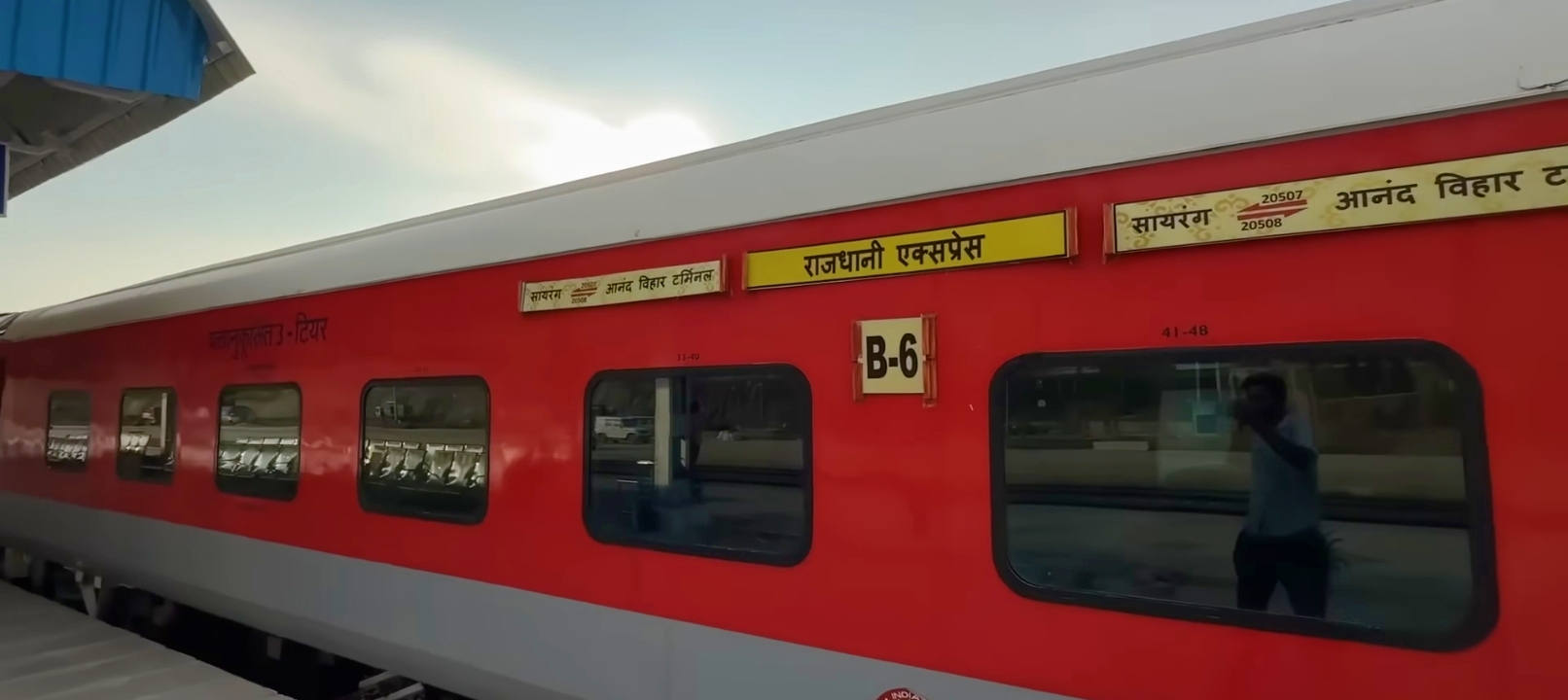
- Sairang - Anand Vihar Terminal Rajdhani Express arrived at Bhagalpur Jn.

Overview
- Service type: Rajdhani Express
- Locale: Mizoram, Assam, West Bengal, Bihar, Uttar Pradesh & New Delhi
- First service: 13 September 2025; 14 months ago (Inaugural); 19 September 2025; 14 months ago (Commercial)
- Current operator: Northeast Frontier Railway (NFR)

Route
- Termini: Sairang (SANG); Anand Vihar Terminal (ANVT)
- Stops: 20
- Distance travelled: 2,515 km (1,563 mi)
- Average journey time: 42 hrs 20 mins
- Service frequency: Weekly
- Train number: 20507 / 20508
- Lines used: Bairabi–Sairang section; Bairabi–Badarpur section; New Haflong–Hojai section; New Bongaigaon–Guwahati section; New Jalpaiguri–New Bongaigaon section; New Jalpaiguri–Sahibganj section; Patna–Pt. Deen Dayal Upadhyaya section; Pt. Deen Dayal Upadhyaya–Kanpur section; Kanpur–Anand Vihar section

On-board services
- Classes: AC First Class, AC 2 Tier, AC 3 Tier
- Seating arrangements: Yes
- Sleeping arrangements: Yes
- Catering facilities: On-board Catering
- Observation facilities: Large windows
- Baggage facilities: No
- Other facilities: Below the seats

Technical
- Rolling stock: LHB coach
- Track gauge: 1,676 mm (5 ft 6 in)
- Operating speed: 130 km/h (81 mph) maximum, 59 km/h (37 mph) average including halts.

The 20507 / 20508 Sairang–Anand Vihar Terminal Rajdhani Express is a Rajdhani Express train of Indian Railways that connects Sairang of Mizoram and Anand Vihar Terminal of New Delhi, the capital city of India.

The train was inaugurated on 13 September 2025 by Prime Minister Narendra Modi from Aizwal, Mizoram in India.

== History ==
The Sairang–Anand Vihar Terminal Rajdhani Express is a premier train service that links the northeastern state of Mizoram with the national capital, New Delhi. The train originates from Sairang, located near Aizawl, and terminates at Anand Vihar Terminal in Delhi. It forms part of Indian Railways’ strategy to improve high-speed and long-distance connectivity for the northeastern region, following similar Rajdhani services introduced from Assam and Tripura. The service gained significance after the Sairang railway station was developed as a key terminal in Mizoram. The train was inaugurated by the Prime Minister of India on 13 September 2025, reflecting the government’s broader policy of enhancing integration of the northeast with the rest of the country. The train provides fully air-conditioned coaches, including First AC, Second AC, and Third AC, with catering and onboard services similar to other Rajdhani Express trains.

In addition to strengthening regional connectivity, the Sairang–Anand Vihar Terminal Rajdhani Express also symbolizes the first-ever direct Rajdhani link for Mizoram. Until its launch, passengers from the state relied on railheads in Assam or Tripura to access long-distance premium trains. The project gained momentum after the completion of the Bhairabi–Sairang railway line, which extended the rail network deep into Mizoram's capital region.

Notably, this service also marked the introduction of a new Rajdhani Express after a gap of nearly six years, making it a significant addition to the Indian Railways network.

== Timings ==
20507 - Sairang | Friday ( 4:30 pm )

20508 - Anand Vihar Terminal | Sunday ( 7:50 pm )

== Route and halts ==
Sr. No	Up Train (20507 - Sairang → Anand Vihar Terminal)	Arr	Dep	Day	Down Train (20508 - Anand Vihar Terminal → Sairang)	Arr	Dep	Day
1	SAIRANG	–	16:30	1	ANAND VIHAR TERMINAL	–	19:50	1
2	BHAIRABI	17:18	17:20	1	KANPUR CENTRAL	00:35	00:40	2
3	HAILAKANDI	18:28	18:30	1	PT. DEEN DAYAL UPADHYAYA JN.	04:35	04:45	2
4	BADARPUR JN.	19:40	19:50	1	PATNA JN	08:00	08:10	2
5	NEW HAFLONG	21:50	21:52	1	JAMALPUR JN	11:05	11:10	2
6	HOJAI	01:43	01:45	2	BHAGALPUR	12:25	12:30	2
7	GUWAHATI	04:00	04:15	2	SAHIBGANJ JN	13:46	13:48	2
8	RANGIYA JN.	05:13	05:15	2	MALDA TOWN	16:15	16:25	2
9	BARPETA ROAD	06:00	06:02	2	NEW JALPAIGURI	19:35	19:45	2
10	NEW BONGAIGAON	07:10	07:12	2	NEW COOCH BEHAR	21:55	22:05	2
11	NEW COOCH BEHAR	08:45	08:55	2	NEW BONGAIGAON	00:10	00:12	3
12	NEW JALPAIGURI	10:35	10:45	2	BARPETA ROAD	01:00	01:02	3
13	MALDA TOWN	14:50	15:00	2	RANGIYA JN.	02:00	02:02	3
14	SAHIBGANJ JN	16:53	16:55	2	GUWAHATI	03:20	03:35	3
15	BHAGALPUR	18:10	18:15	2	HOJAI	05:43	05:45	3
16	JAMALPUR JN	19:10	19:15	2	NEW HAFLONG	09:00	09:02	3
17	PATNA JN	22:00	22:10	2	BADARPUR JN.	11:20	11:30	3
18	PT. DEEN DAYAL UPADHYAYA JN.	01:20	01:30	3	HAILAKANDI	12:30	12:32	3
19	KANPUR CENTRAL	05:30	05:35	3	BHAIRABI	13:44	13:46	3
20	ANAND VIHAR TERMINAL	10:50	–	3	SAIRANG	15:15	–	3

== Technical Halt ==
At Manderdisa Railway Station (MYD), banker locomotives are typically attached for trains traveling south/eastbound and detached for trains traveling northbound. Because some of the trains are not officials halt at Lumding Jn, So, it will take a bypass from Patharkhola to Manderdisa to serves as a critical operational stop for handling banker engines:

== Coach composition ==
Coach Type	Code	Quantity
Engine	ENG	2
Luggage/Parcel Van	LPR	2
First AC Tier	1A	1
Second AC Tier	2A	4
Third AC Tier	3A	12
Pantry Car	PC	1

== Traction ==
Since its first inaugural run, the train was hauled by a NGC Loco Shed-based WDP-4D diesel locomotive. Even the route is not fully electrified, it was still hauled by a WAP-7 electric locomotive and WDP-4D diesel locomotive from end to end.

== Rake reversal ==
The train will reverse 1 time with both directions:

1. Badarpur Junction

== Accidents and incidents ==
20 December 2025: At around 2:17 am in Hojai district of Assam (Jamunamukh- Kampur section under the Lumding division), while the train was speeding at 100 km/h, it encountered a herd of around 100 elephants crossing the railway tracks. The locomotive pilot pressed the emergency brake but was unable to stop on time and hit the herd of elephants, resulting in the derailment of five coaches. Seven elephants were killed, and one was injured in this accident. However, no injuries to passengers were reported.

== See also ==
- Rajdhani Express
- Humsafar Express
- Duronto Express
- Sairang railway station
- Anand Vihar Terminal railway station

== Notes ==
a. Runs 1 day in a week.
