= Jiribam railway station =

Railway station in Manipur, India

Jiribam

General information
- Location: Jiribam, Jiribam district, Manipur; India
- Coordinates: 24°47′38″N 93°05′59″E
- Elevation: 36 m (118 ft)
- System: Indian Railways station
- Owner: Indian Railways
- Operator: Northeast Frontier Railway
- Line: Katakhal–Jiribam–Imphal line
- Platforms: 1
- Tracks: 3

Other information
- Status: Functioning
- Station code: JRBM
- Zone(s): North East Frontier Railway
- Division(s): Lumding

History
- Opened: 1903
Location
- Location within Manipur

Jiribam railway station serves Jiribam town and belongs to the Lumding railway division of Northeast Frontier Railway. It is the first railway station in the state of Manipur, India.

== History ==
The Jiribam rail ink was a part of rail link to Assam for tea transportation in the early 20th century. It was constructed by Assam Bengal Railway. With the partition of India in 1947, portions of the Bengal Assam Railway which lay in Assam and the Indian part of North Bengal became Assam Railway. North Eastern Railway was formed in 1952 by amalgamating Assam Railway with Oudh and Tirhut Railway and the Fatehgarh district of Bombay, Baroda and Central India Railway. Northeast Frontier Railway was formed out of North Eastern Railway in 1958.

The portion of the system which fell within the boundary of East Pakistan was named as Eastern Bengal Railway. On 1 February 1961, Eastern Bengal Railway was renamed as Pakistan Railway and in 1962 it became Pakistan Eastern Railway. With the emergence of Bangladesh, it became Bangladesh Railway.

After the independence of Pakistan on 15 August 1947 the broad-gauge portion of the Bengal-Assam Railway, lying in India was added to the East Indian Railway and the metre-gauge portion became the Assam Railway, with its headquarters at Pandu. On 14 April 1952, the 2857 km long Assam Railway and the Oudh and Tirhut Railway were amalgamated to form one of the six newly formed zones of the Indian Railways: the North Eastern Railway zone. On the same day, the reorganized Sealdah division of the Bengal Assam Railway (which was added to the East Indian Railway earlier) was amalgamated with the Eastern Railway.

In December 2009, work on gauge conversion from Silchar to Jiribam started which was finished in early 2016 and goods services resumed.

== Train services ==
Freight trains started to run on the Silchar–Jiribam segment from 21 March 2016.

Passenger services started on 27 May 2016 and one pair of Silchar–Jiribam Passenger (55665/55666) is running on this section between Silchar and Jiribam.

Union railway minister Ashwini Vaishnaw flagged off the Jan Shatabdi Express between Agartala railway station and Jiribam railway station connecting two northeastern states, Tripura and Manipur on 8 January 2022.

== Under construction projects ==
Jiribam–Imphal line is likely to be completed by December 2023 as per August 2021 status update, which will be extended to Moreh on the India–Myanmar border and then to Kalay (also called Kale and Kalemyo) in Myanmar to form part of the ambitious Trans-Asian Railway.

== See also ==
- Lumding railway division
- Northeast Frontier Railway zone
