= Haipou Jadonang Kambiron railway station =

Railway station in India

Coordinates: 24.747°N 93.384°E

Haipou Jadonang Kambiron

General information
- Location: Manipur Road, Kombiron Village, Manipur; India
- Elevation: 207 metres (679 ft)
- System: Indian Railways station
- Owner: Indian Railways
- Operator: Northeast Frontier Railway
- Line: Katakhal–Jiribam–Imphal line
- Platforms: 1
- Tracks: 2

Construction
- Structure type: Standard (on-ground station)
- Parking: No
- Cycle facilities: No

Other information
- Status: Operational
- Station code: KBBP
- Zone(s): Northeast Frontier Railway
- Division(s): Lumding

History
- Opened: March 14, 2022
Location

Haipou Jadonang Kambiron railway station is a railway station in Tamenglong district, Manipur. Its code is KBBP. It will serve Kambiron village. The station was renamed in honor of Haipou Jadonang, a freedom fighter of India and the founder of the Zeliangrong movement, in 2014. The work on this rail line is expected to be finished year 2019.
