= Barengapara =

Village in Meghalaya, India

Coordinates: 25°13′18″N 90°13′20″E

Barengapara is a village in West Garo Hills district of Meghalaya state in India.

== See also ==
- West Garo Hills district
