= Rani Gaidinliu railway station =

Railway station in India

Rani Gaidinliu station

General information
- Other names: Kaimai Road station
- Location: Muktokhal Road, Manipur; India
- Coordinates: 24.742°N 93.237°E
- Elevation: 207 metres (679 ft)
- System: Indian Railways station
- Owner: Indian Railways
- Operator: Northeast Frontier Railway
- Line: Katakhal–Jiribam–Imphal line
- Platforms: 2
- Tracks: 2

Construction
- Structure type: Standard (on-ground station)
- Parking: No
- Cycle facilities: No

Other information
- Status: Operational
- Station code: RGBP
- Zone(s): Northeast Frontier Railway
- Division(s): Lumding

History
- Opened: TBA
Location

Rani Gaidinliu railway station, formerly called Kaimai Road railway station, is a railway station in Tamenglong district, Manipur. Its code is RGBP. It serves the villages of Oinamlong, Kaimai and Thingtatbung. The station consists of two platforms. The railway track and station were completed in early 2022 and the first freight train arrived on 29 January.

The station is at the base of the Kala Naga range, in the Makru River valley. An access road leads up to the National Highway 37 near Oinamlong. Another road leads up to Thingtatbung, which is on the Vangaitang range to the west of Makru River.
