= Khongsang railway station =

Railway station in India

Khongsang

General information
- Location: Jiribam–Imphal Road, Nungba, Tamenglong Manipur; India
- Coordinates: 24.836°N 93.487°E
- Elevation: 342 metres (1,122 ft)
- System: Indian Railways station
- Owner: Indian Railways
- Operator: Northeast Frontier Railway
- Line: Jiribam–Imphal railway line
- Platforms: 2
- Tracks: 3

Construction
- Structure type: Standard (on-ground station)
- Parking: No
- Cycle facilities: No

Other information
- Status: Operational
- Station code: KGBP
- Zone(s): Northeast Frontier Railway
- Division(s): Lumding

History
- Opened: March 14, 2022
Location

Khongsang railway station is a railway station in Tamenglong district, Manipur about 106 km from capital Imphal by road. Its code is KGBP. It serves Khongsang village of Nungba sub-division of Tamenglong District. The station includes two platforms. The first train engine reached Khongsang station on March 14, 2022. The first Goods Train reached Khongsang station on March 28, 2022. On October 13, 2022, the President of India flagged off the first passenger train from Agartala to Khaongsang. Presently two trains terminate and originate from Khongsang Railway Station, 12097/12098 Agartala Khongsang Jan Shatabdi Express and 05659/05660 Silchar Khongsang Passenger Special.

This station is a part of Jiribam–Imphal railway line Project.
