= Thingu railway station =

Railway station in India

Thingou

General information
- Location: Jiribam–Imphal Road, Manipur; India
- Coordinates: 24.809°N 93.405°E
- Elevation: 521 metres (1,709 ft)
- System: Indian Railways station
- Owner: Indian Railways
- Operator: Northeast Frontier Railway
- Line: Jiribam–Imphal railway line
- Platforms: 2
- Tracks: 3

Construction
- Structure type: Standard (on-ground station)
- Parking: No
- Cycle facilities: No

Other information
- Status: Operational
- Station code: TGBP
- Zone(s): Northeast Frontier Railway
- Division(s): Lumding
Location

Thingou railway station is a railway station in Tamenglong district, Manipur. Its code is TGBP. It serves Thingou village of Nungba sub-division. The station proposal includes two platforms. The work on this rail line is expected to be finished year 2019.
