= Bairabi–Sairang line =

Railway line in Mizoram of India

Overview
- Status: Completed
- Owner: Indian Railways
- Locale: Mizoram, India
- Termini: Bairabi; Sairang
- Stations: 5
- Website: Indian Railway Website

History
- Opened: 13 September 2025

Technical
- Line length: 51.38 km (31.93 mi)
- Num of tracks: Single diesel line
- Track gauge: 5 ft 6 in (1,676 mm)
- Electrification: under progress

India earthquake zone map showing Bairabi–Sairang line in zone 5.

The Bairabi–Sairang line is an Indian railway line from Bairabi to Sairang in Mizoram under the Northeast Frontier Railway zone of Indian Railways. It is the only railway line that connects Aizawl, the capital city of Mizoram, with other parts of India. The project initiated in 2015, was completed and inaugurated in 2025. It reduce the travel time from Bairabi to Aizawl—from 6–7 hours by road to under 1 hour by train and Silchar in just 3 hours which used to take 8-12 hours by road, benefitting students, traders, medical patients and tourists with a more affordable travel option.

== History ==
In 1999, the plan to build Bairabi-Sairang line was conceived, but did not materialise due to the proposed alignment through deep forest, hence, in 2006 a survey for a new alignment was completed and the new alignment was approved in 2008. The construction started in 2015. 23% of the line is on bridges including 55 major bridges including one of India’s tallest pier bridges 105 metres (344 ft) over the Kurung river, 30% through 45 tunnels, and the rest on steep unstable slopes in earthquake prone seismic zone 5, making construction riskier. Bairabi-Sairang rail line entails 142 bridges (55 major bridges and 87 minor bridges), and four stations, and 28 hectares (69 acres) land was acquired for the construction. The Northeast Frontier Railway completed the construction of the tallest pier in Mizoram in the approach of Sairang Railway Station, the height of this pier is 105 metres (344 ft). On 23 August 2023, a span under construction on the Sairang bridge collapsed, killing 26 workers. Key details of this project aside from Kurung Bridge are a 1,870 metres (6,140 ft) long tunnel (the longest among 45 tunnels in this stretch), the 331 metres (1,086 ft) long bridge near Hortoki station (the longest among 55 major bridges and 87 minor bridges in this stretch) & 66 scenic curves enroute.

In 2008, the total estimated cost of entire project as ₹619 crore, later revised to ₹2384 crores, then ₹5021.45 crores, and then in 2017 to ₹8605 crores, and actually costed ₹8,071 crore upon completion in 2025.

On 13 September 2025, Prime Minister Narendra Modi inaugurated the railway line with an opening service of the Sairang–Delhi Rajdhani Express, the Sairang–Guwahati Express and the Sairang-Kolkata Express.

== Route ==
The route has one existing and four new stations at the time of construction, listed north to south:

- Bairabi railway station, existing.
- Hortoki railway station, new.
- Kawnpui railway station, new.
- Mualkhang railway station, new.
- Sairang railway station, new.

== Trains ==
Direct trains from Sairang near Aizawl are running to New Delhi 2,510 kilometres (1,560 mi), Guwahati 483 kilometres (300 mi), Kolkata 1,495 kilometres (929 mi) and Silchar 154 kilometres (96 mi)which also connect other major cities, such as Agartala 364 kilometres (226 mi), Siliguri 900 kilometres (560 mi), and Dimapur 385 kilometres (239 mi).

Sairang-Anand Vihar Terminal Rajdhani Express, Kolkata-Sairang Express, Guwahati-Sairang Express & Silchar-Sairang Passenger are running only now.

== Further extension ==
=== South spur to Kyauktau railhead to Sittwe in Myanmar ===
- Zochachhuah (Zorinpui)-Sairang line, 223 km: In August 2015, Indian Railways completed a survey for a new route extension from Sairang to Hmawngbuchhuah/Zorinpui on Mizoram's southern tip on India–Myanmar border, which will provide rail connectivity to Kaladan Multi-Modal Transit Transport Project (KMMTTP). In August 2017, survey for this line was completed. In August 2023, considering the strategic importance the Railway Board approved the commencement of "Final Location Survey" (FSL).
- Zochachhuah (Zorinpui)-Kyaukhtu line: is 200 km planned railway line.
- Sittwe–Kyaukhtu line in Myanmar, 90 km (56 mi) – exists and operational: This route has been operational since 2011. To integrate with other routes-network in Myanmar, it will be further extended 311 km by 2021–22, from Kyaukhtu in north to Ann in south and then south-east to Minbu where it will connect to Myanmar rail network as well as 1,215 km (755 mi) long Kyaukpyu port–Minbu–Kunming high-speed railway being planned by China.

=== East spur to Kalemyo railhead in Myanmar ===
- Aizawl-Zokhawthar line future spur, from where it will then be extended to the existing railhead at Kalay (also called Kale and Kalemyo) in Myanmar to form part of the ambitious Trans-Asian Railway.
- Imphal-Moreh line 111km: in August 2023, the "Final Location Survey" (FSL) was already underway and it was expected to be completed soon. Future spur will be extended from Moreh in India to the existing railhead at Kalay in Myanmar.
- Kalemyo-Shwebo line, a new link connecting the existing railheads at Kalemyo and Shwebo for a shorter direct route to Mandalay and beyond.

== Current status ==
- 2025 Sep: Bairabi–Sairang section is operational, other extensions are in the planning stages.

== See also ==
- North Eastern Railway Connectivity Project
