= Sairang =

- Town
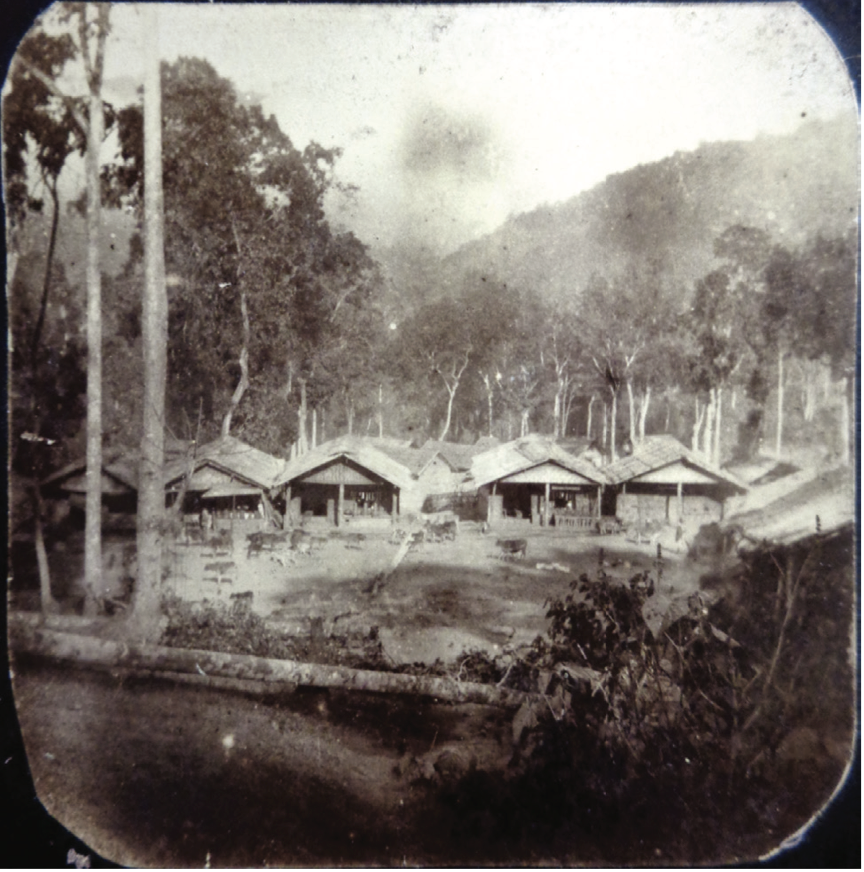
- Sairang Bazaar in 1896

- Location within Mizoram Location within India
- Coordinates: 23.8°N 92.67°E
- Country: India
- State: Mizoram
- District: Aizawl
- Elevation: 210 m (690 ft)

Population (2001)
  - Total: 5,036

Languages
  - Official: Mizo
- Time zone: UTC+5:30 (IST)
- Vehicle registration: MZ
- Climate: Aw
- Website: mizoram.nic.in

Sairang is a town in the Aizawl district of the Indian state of Mizoram. Due to its proximity to Aizawl city, it acts as a satellite town of the city.

== History ==
After the British invasion of 1871-1872, Bengali traders set up the first marketplace in Mizoram in Changsil.

Sairang is the nearest town with river from Aizawl which is about 14 kilometers. The journey of about 140 Kilometers from Sairang to Silchar via Tlawng river used to take about 15–30 days during the 1890s, depending upon the season and water level on a flat water boat.

== Geography ==
Sairang is located at 23.8°N 92.67°E.

== Connectivity ==
Sairang lies on the route of Kaladan Multi-Modal Transit Transport Project. It is connected with roads from major towns in Assam, through NH 54. A new Railway broad gauge line from Bairabi to Sairang was completed in June-July 2025. Its railway station also serve Aizawl, the capital of Mizoram.

Survey for the Rail line from Sairang to Hmawngbuchhuah on the border near Zorinpui was completed in August 2017 and it will be constructed in the future phase.

100 kilometres (62 mi) route from the Indo-Myanmar border at Zorinpui to Aizawl is upgraded to two lanes in both directions (total 4 lanes). From Aizal it connect to Aizawal-Saiha National Highway at Lawngtlai in Mizoram in India by road on National Highway 54 (India) (NH-54), which then continues further to Dabaka in Assam via 850 km long NH-54 which in turn is part of the larger East-West Corridor connecting North East India with the rest of India. Almost complete (June 2017). Tender has been awarded, upgrade to this national highway is under construction and to be completed by 2019.

== Demographics ==
As of the 2011 Census of India, Sairang had a population of 5,950.
