= Pauk Ko Taw =

Burmese nationalist Buddhist monk (born 1985)

Ashin Pauk Ko Taw
- ပေါက်ကိုယ်တော်

Personal life
- Born: August 1985 (age 40) Pauk
- Known for: Buddhist monk, and association with Ma Ba Tha
- Other name: Ashin Ariawuntha (အရှင်အရိယဝံသ)
- Occupation: Buddhist monk

Religious life
- Religion: Buddhism
- School: Theravada
- Movement: Ma Ba Tha (Patriotic Association of Myanmar)

Pauk Ko Taw (Burmese: ပေါက်ကိုယ်တော်; pronounced [paʊʔ kò dɔ̀], also known as Ashin Ariawuntha (Burmese: အရှင်အရိယဝံသ; pronounced [ʔəʃɪ̀ɰ̃ ʔəɹḭjə wʊ̀ɰ̃ θa̰], born August 1985) is a Burmese nationalist Buddhist monk involved in both religious and political movements in Myanmar. He is a member of the now defunct Ma Ba Tha (Patriotic Association of Myanmar), a nationalist group advocating for the protection of Buddhism in Myanmar.

Pauk Ko Taw has had a significant influence on top military generals in the Mandalay Region and has led the military-backed Pyusawhti militias in both the Magway and Mandalay regions. His views on Buddhism's role in politics have been both supported by nationalist groups and criticized by human rights organizations and other observers.

== Early life and ordination ==
Pauk Ko Taw was born in August 1985 in Pauk, Myanmar and later adopted the monastic name Warthawa. He eventually became known as Ashin Ariawuntha (အရှင်အရိယဝံသ), a name associated with his public persona and involvement in nationalist movements.

== Life ==
Pauk Ko Taw rose to prominence within Ma Ba Tha, a Buddhist nationalist organization that advocates for the protection of Myanmar's Buddhist identity. He is a member of the Patriotic Myanmar Monks Union (Mandalay).

He was previously arrested along with other Ma Ba Tha monks in 2018 for organizing a protest camp in Mandalay calling for the overthrow of the NLD government. He was sentenced to nearly a year in Mandalay's Obo Prison.

Pauk Ko Taw has openly supported Myanmar's military junta, especially following the 2021 coup. While Ma Ba Tha leaders and his mentor Wirathu were imprisoned, Pauk Ko Taw emerged at the forefront of pro-military campaigns supporting the coup regime. His alignment with the junta has drawn both support from its proponents and criticism from pro-democracy activists, and some Buddhist leaders, human rights organizations, such as Progressive Voice Myanmar, Amnesty International,United Nations, and Burma Human Rights Network.

Pauk Ko Taw is referred to as the second-generation leader of Ma Ba Tha and is also described as a close disciple of Wirathu. His connection to the junta has led to his categorization as a key figure within Myanmar's Buddhist nationalist movements. He later often posts criticism of Senior General Min Aung Hlaing, while frequently praising and supporting Vice Senior General Soe Win on his social media platforms.

On January 16, 2024, during a protest in Pyin Oo Lwin, Pauk Ko Taw called for the resignation of Senior General Min Aung Hlaing, citing poor national administration, and requested his replacement as Commander-in-Chief by the second-in-command, Soe Win. He was subsequently arrested for this speech and later released after a short time.

Pauk Ko Taw has emerged as a leader of the Pyusawhti militias in central Myanmar, tasked by the military regime with overseeing these militias undergoing military training. He delivered a speech at a Pyusawhti militias commando training graduation ceremony in Mandalay Region, urging the brutal suppression of those opposing the military. In addition, top military generals in the Mandalay Region revere Pauk Ko Taw. Recently, they invited him to encourage soldiers injured in battles against northern alliances and to deliver sermons within the military.

In August 2024, senior Buddhist monks of the Saffron Revolution have called on the State Sangha Maha Nayaka Committee to take action against extremist nationalist monks Wirathu, U Wasawa, and Pauk Ko Taw under monastic disciplinary rules for their involvement in armed activities and promoting terrorism.

In September 2024, seven members of Pauk Ko Taw's Pyusawhti militia were arrested in Mandalay for committing armed robbery.
