= Thway Thout =

Myanmar death squad

- Dates active: 2022–present
- Split from: Pyusawhti militias (alleged, unconfirmed)
- Active regions: Mandalay Region; Yangon Region; Taunggyi
- Ideology: Militarism; Ultranationalism; Buddhist nationalism
- Political position: Far-right
- Wars: the internal conflict in Myanmar

The Thway Thout A Pwe or Thway Thauk Apwe (Burmese: သွေးသောက်အဖွဲ့, lit. 'blood drinkers' group'') is or was a death squad active in Myanmar's central Mandalay Region since the Myanmar civil war. Emerging in early 2022, the Thway Thout's ideology beyond support for the Tatmadaw and opposition to the National League for Democracy remains uncertain. The group has claimed responsibility for the killing of several NLD members and activists since its foundation.

== Ideology and foundation ==
The ideology of the Thway Thout can be described as ultranationalist with support for the military junta. Radio Free Asia has alleged that the group may be diverse, including former members of the Pyusawhti militias, followers of the Patriotic Association of Myanmar, and supporters of the Union Solidarity and Development Party, as well as family members of individuals killed by the resistance forces for collaboration with the Tatmadaw. According to Al Jazeera English, the group has ties to ultranationalist Buddhist monk Ashin Wirathu. The primary position of the Thway Thout is in support of the Tatmadaw, and it has threatened to kill journalists who report critically on the military government.

The first reference to the Thway Thout dates to 21 April 2022, when pro-government social media personality Han Nyein Oo shared a statement by the group announcing the beginning of "Operation Red". Four days after this, the group began posting images of killed members of the National League for Democracy on its Telegram channel.

== Activities ==
The Thway Thout is primarily active in Myanmar's central Mandalay Region. It has primarily targeted individuals relating to the National League for Democracy and their family members, including allegedly killing two people related to a possible supporter of the National Unity Government on 20 May 2022. Since their founding, the group has risen to become among the most feared in the country, outpacing the older Pyusawhti, the Thway Thitsar in Naypyidaw, the Yangon Castigators in Yangon, the Patriotic Coalition of Pyay Township, and the Soon Ye of Tanintharyi Region. The group has claimed responsibility for the killing of more than 14 members of the NLD as of 2 June 2022, organising and posting photos of its killings on Telegram. By May 2023, this number had grown to at least 58.

The State Administration Council has denied any connection to the Thway Thout, though human rights activists have argued that such a claim is improbable based on the group's training. On 10 June 2022, Asia Times reported that the group had spread to Yangon and Taunggyi.

== See also ==
- Pyusawhti militias
- Ka Kwe Ye
- Death squads in El Salvador
- Mano Blanca
- GAL (paramilitary group)
