= Race and Religion Protection Laws =

Series of 2015 laws in Myanmar

Population Control Law

Pyidaungsu Hluttaw
- Long title: The Health Care in the Adjustment of Population Increase Law (28/2015)
- Passed by: Thein Sein
- Passed: 27 April 2015
- Enacted: 19 May 2015
- Status: Current legislation

Religious Conversion Law

Pyidaungsu Hluttaw
- Long title: The Religious Conversion Law (48/2015)
- Enacted by: Thein Sein
- Enacted: 26 August 2015
- Status: Current legislation

Interfaith Marriage Law

Pyidaungsu Hluttaw
- Long title: The Myanmar Buddhist Women's Special Marriage Law (50/2015)
- Enacted by: Thein Sein
- Enacted: 26 August 2015
- Status: Current legislation

Monogamy Law

Pyidaungsu Hluttaw
- Long title: The Law Relating to the Monogamous System (54/2015)
- Enacted by: Thein Sein
- Enacted: 31 August 2015
- Status: Current legislation

The 2015 Race and Religion Protection Laws are a series of 4 controversial laws passed in Myanmar. The laws were drafted in 2013 and pushed by the Committee for the Protection of Nationality and Religion, or Ma Ba Tha. They include the Population Control Law, the Mongogamy Law, the Religious Conversion Law, the Interfaith Marriage Law (also called the Special Marriage Law).

== Background ==
The Buddhist nationalist 969 Movement formed in the early 2010s in opposition to what they see as Islam's expansion in Myanmar, a predominantly Buddhist country. The movement was led by Ashin Wirathu, a Buddhist monk called "The Face of Buddhist Terror" by Time magazine. On 20 March 2013, tensions between Buddhist and Muslim ethnic groups in Meiktila, Mandalay Region turned violent. The 2013 Myanmar anti-Muslim riots quickly escalated with mobs attacking and torching Muslim houses, mosques and schools across Mandalay Region. While these riots may not have been incited by the 969 movement, many nationalistic monks "rode the wave" and began to incite greater tensions between Buddhists and Muslims.

In 2014, the State Sangha Maha Nayaka Committee prohibited the use of '969' for political uses. The committee issued an order on 2 September prohibiting the creation of formal 969 organizations. The committee did not object to the promotion of 969 ideology but found that drafting proposed laws had gone too far. Wirathu rejected the order calling the committee undemocratic citing that the committee was created by the former military regime to control the monkhood. Later, the Committee for the Protection of Race and Religion (Ma Ba Tha) was created and began formally lobbying for laws to regulate religious conversion. Particularly the 969 movement sought to pass a law forbidding Buddhist women from marrying non-Buddhist men without the permission of local officials.

The four laws had been prominent within domestic politics since mid-2013 and reached parliament in late 2014 in the midst of nationalist sentiment. As the November 2015 election approached, President Thein Sein faced pressure to sign them into law from both Ma Ba Tha and his nationalistic Union Solidarity and Development Party. Ma Ba Tha further pressured parliamentarians by asking their congregations not to vote for "traitors" who did not support the laws.

== Laws ==
=== Population Control Law ===
The Health Care in the Adjustment of Population Increase Law (Burmese: လူဦးရေတိုးပွားနှုန်းထိန်းညှိခြင်းဆိုင်ရာ ကျန်းမာရေးစောင့်ရှောက်မှုဥပဒေ) was signed by President Thein Sein on 19 May 2015 despite several objections from domestic activists and international organizations.

The law's objectives, as written, are to enable the Ministry of Health to alleviate poverty and provide healthcare relating to "the adjustment of population increase" in socioeconomically underdeveloped regions. The law requires the Ministry of Health to provide assistance, various administrative and healthcare services and medical distribution to areas determined to need healthcare. Areas are determined to need healthcare if population growth, population density, increased fertility rates or migration is currently or expected to be high. Local governments are given the authority to request this assistance to limit reproductive rates in areas where an "imbalance between population and resources" negatively impacts regional development. Of the provisions applied onto the area, the most controversial was that women would be required to space the birth of their children 36 months apart.

The law was criticized by the United Nations Population Fund as coercive birth-spacing requirements could violate women's human rights. Furthermore, the law only imposes these restrictions on certain regions and could be triggered discriminatorily towards areas with a high Muslim population.

=== Religious Conversion Law ===
The Religious Conversion Law (Burmese: ကိုးကွယ်ရာဘာသာကူးပြောင်းခြင်းဆိုင်ရာ ဥပဒေ) was signed by President Thein Sein on 26 August 2015.

The law establishes Scrutiny and Registration Boards in each township and requires any citizen of Myanmar wishing to convert to be (1) at least 18 years old, (2) submit a complete application to the Scrutiny and Registration Board and (3) pass an interview with the Board. The Board can have the applicant engage in religious studies up to 180 days from the application before willing converts are given a certificate of conversion. In Chapter 6, the law further prescribes punishments for forced conversions or converts who convert with the intention of "insulting, degrading, destroying or misusing a religion".

The law's requirement for local government officials to approve conversion applications was a cause for concern to many rights groups. Human Rights Watch called the law discriminatory and incompatible with the Universal Declaration of Human Rights. Amnesty International expressed concerns that given the rise of religious tensions, authorities could abuse this law and further harass minorities.

=== Interfaith Marriage Law ===
The Myanmar Buddhist Women's Special Marriage Law (Burmese: မြန်မာဗုဒ္ဓဘာသာဝင်မိန်းမများ အထူးထိမ်းမြားခြင်းဆိုင်ရာ ဥပဒေ) was signed into law alongside the Religious Conversion Law by Thein Sein on 26 May 2015. This law was perhaps one of the most controversial as the primary law lobbied for by Ma Ba Tha and as the most explicit law protecting Buddhism specifically. The law passed 524 to 44 in a joint session of the Pyidaungsu Hluttaw, Myanmar's legislative body.

The law explicitly aims to protect the rights of Myanmar Buddhist women marrying a non-Buddhist man, defining a Myanmar Buddhist women as a citizen woman who professes the Buddhist faith or is a woman born of parents who profess the faith unless the woman has officially converted through the Religious Conversion Law. Unlike the Religious Conversion Law, the Interfaith Marriage Law requires legal adults to have parental consent if the woman is under 20 years of age. The Interfaith Marriage Law further allows local townships to publicly display the application for interfaith marriage for 14 days and allows any objections to the marriage to go to local court. Beyond the increased administrative burden placed on interfaith marriages, the law further requires the non-Buddhist husband to respect the free practice of his spouse's Buddhism, including displaying Buddha images, and denies him any joint property or custody if he divorces his Buddhist wife. A non-Buddhist husband is required to disassociate from his original family with all property upon his death going to his Buddhist wife and children.

Amnesty International criticized the law for blatantly discriminating on both religious and gender grounds as well as relying on stereotypes that Buddhist women are vulnerable to forced conversion by non-Buddhist husbands. The Human Rights Watch (HRW) criticized the violation of Myanmar's treaty obligations under international law, specifically the Convention on the Elimination of All Forms of Discrimination Against Women requiring signatories to eliminate discrimination against women in matters relating to marriage. The HRW further cites International Covenant on Civil and Political Rights, which Myanmar did not sign for its clause to uphold the right to marry without discrimination on religious grounds.

=== Monogamy Law ===
The Law Relating to the Monogamous System (Burmese: တစ်လင်တစ်မယားစနစ် ကျင့်သုံးခြင်းဆိုင်ရာဥပဒေ, lit. 'Law Regarding the Practice of One Husband One Wife System') was signed into law by President Thein Sein on 31 August 2015 as the last of the four Race and Religion Protection Laws after being briefly sent back to the Hluttaw on 21 August 2015. The law was criticized for its potential abuse to arbitrarily interfere with privacy and family affairs. The government denied that it was aimed at Muslims, some of whom practice polygamy.

The law applies makes it a criminal offense to have more than one spouse or live with an unmarried partner while either has a spouse. The person who enters into another marriage or illegal extramarital affair will have committed the criminal act of polygamy or conjugal infidelity. It mentions religion by stating that marriage conducted in accordance with any law, religion or custom shall only be legal if it is monogamous. Chapter 3 further explicitly repeats this three more times for Buddhists, Buddhist women and non-Buddhist men and for non-Buddhists. The law is applied beyond citizens by including residents in Myanmar and foreigners married to a citizen.

Amnesty International criticized the law for its unclear purpose since polygamy is already criminalized in Article 494 of the Penal Code including the criminalization of extramarital affairs. The law further lacks provisions for children of polygamous marriages or for transgender or intersex individuals.

== Controversy and Reactions ==
The first of the four laws, the Population Control Law, was passed in the wake of increase pressure from international organizations and foreign governments on the Government of Myanmar to alleviate discriminatory conditions for the persecuted Rohingya people, causing many to fear that the law is designed to target the Rohingya. Amnesty International's analysis of the Religious Conversion Bill found it unclear if the bill would apply to non-citizens like the Rohingya.

Many concerns raised were on the grounds of implementation and enforcement. While the laws where still drafts, Amnesty International and the International Commission of Jurists stated that the Population Control Law and the Monogamy Law required significant revisions, including safeguards, to ensure that they would not be used discriminatorily. The Myanmar National Human Rights Commission, when asked about whether non-citizens would be burdened with bills only targeting citizens, was unable to conclusively dissuade concerns that non-citizens would be targeted by the four laws.

Several rights organizations, including Amnesty International and Human Rights Watch, urged President Thein Sein to reject the laws and refuse to sign them.

The laws also generally saw criticism on its violations of religious freedom, human rights and international conventions that Myanmar had ratified. Ma Ba Tha, who lobbied for the laws, defends the laws as a way to protect the country against Muslim whom they accuse of trying to take over Myanmar by outbreeding the Buddhist majority. Organizations like Amnesty International stated that beyond giving the state more powers to discriminate against women and minorities, they would also ignite further ethnic tension. Human Rights Watched stated that the laws would entrench religious discrimination and expressed concern that the many local boards set up by the laws would be disproportionately or exclusively ethnic Burman Buddhist officials. Beyond discriminatory bias, such local groups could stoke communal tensions. Furthermore, the laws were criticized for relying on gender discriminatory narratives associating women with purity. Furthermore, many regard the language and focus on religion and interfaith marriages as evidence of the bill as an attempt to legalize discrimination.

Since the laws' passing in 2015, the country has undergone many religious and ethnic conflicts including the 2017 Rohingya genocide and the 2021-2022 Myanmar civil war. While the four laws remain in effect, they have been rarely applied. This may be due to the new 2015-2020 National League for Democracy government coming into power shortly after the laws were passed. Many townships do not have the Scrutiny and Registration Boards as required by the Religious Conversion Law set up.
