= Accession of Sri Lanka to ASEAN =

Accession process of Sri Lanka to ASEAN

ASEAN (blue) and Sri Lanka (red)

Flag of Sri Lanka

The accession of Sri Lanka to the Association of Southeast Asian Nations began as early as 1967, making its accession process older than that of some current ASEAN members. Currently, the Sri Lankan government has yet to revive the idea.

== Accession requirements ==
The ASEAN Charter defines the following criteria for membership:

- The state must be geographically located in Southeast Asia.
- The state must be recognized by all ASEAN member states.
- The state must agree to be bound by the ASEAN Charter
- The state must be able and willing to carry out the obligations of membership such as:
  - Maintaining embassies in all current member countries of the bloc
  - Attending all ministerial meetings and summits
  - Acceding to all treaties, declarations and agreements in the bloc

=== Sri Lanka membership issues ===
A major perception behind Sri Lanka's non-admission to ASEAN was that Sri Lanka was considered as outside of Southeast Asia. Though during ASEAN's formation, what defines a part of Southeast Asia was not yet fixed. The Allied-established South East Asia Command (SEAC) popularised the phrase "Southeast Asia," albeit what made up Southeast Asia was not established; for example, SEAC ignored the Philippines and a substantial portion of Indonesia while including Ceylon (Sri Lanka). However, by the late 1970s, a broadly accepted usage of the phrase "Southeast Asia" and the areas it encompassed had established. Though at the time, it was up to ASEAN to determine which states were deemed part of Southeast Asia for membership purposes. Even so, the founding fathers of ASEAN did not bar Sri Lanka from ever joining the organisation. Another major reason as to why Sri Lanka was not able to join ASEAN was due to its perceived economic and political instability that stands until today.

== Foreign relations with ASEAN member states ==
- Myanmar (7 June 1949)
- Cambodia (28 May 1952)
- Indonesia (6 August 1952)
- Thailand (20 November 1955)
- Malaysia (October 1957)
- Philippines (11 January 1961)
- Laos (20 July 1965)
- Singapore (20 July 1970)
- Vietnam (21 July 1970)
- Brunei (3 April 1984)
- (Timor-Leste) Timor Leste (4 May 2022)

== Background ==
=== Malaysian invitation ===
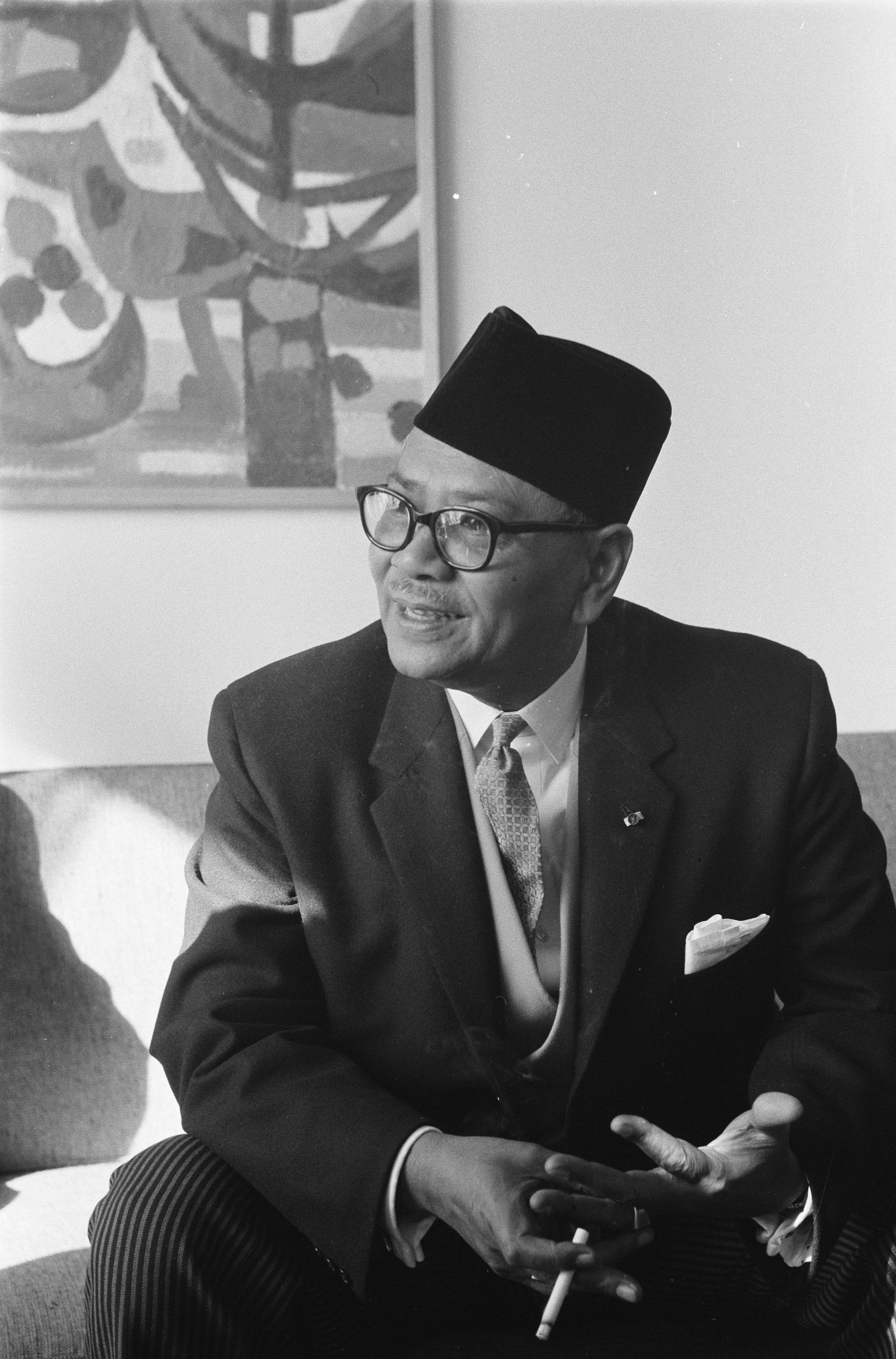
Malaysian Prime Minister, Tunku Abdul Rahman, hoped for Ceylon's Inclusion to ASEAN

On August 8, 1967, the Association of Southeast Asian Nations (ASEAN) was established in Bangkok, a regional organization comprising Indonesia, Malaysia, Thailand, Singapore, and the Philippines as its founding members. As the organization was established, there was an endeavor by Ceylon, now known as Sri Lanka, to become part of this nascent association as a 'founding father.' As the Bangkok Declaration was signed, Tun Abdul Razak, leading the Malaysian delegation, disclosed that Malaysian Prime Minister Tunku Abdul Rahman had previously committed to the Prime Minister of Ceylon regarding Ceylon's potential admission to the group. Razak expressed his inability to retract this commitment, leaving the other delegates taken aback. The proposed geographical scope of the organization did not extend beyond Burma. From here, there are differing controversial accounts whether as to why Ceylon's application motion by Malaysia did not get accepted.

During the time, the Ceylon's embassy in Thailand was instructed to inquire if Sri Lanka could become a founding member of the organization. Despite reservations from Singapore, a motion was passed for the postponement of the meeting. The delegations of all 5 countries opted to await Ceylon's response to the invitation and their delegation's arrival to Bangkok and sign the declaration as a founding member of ASEAN. Then Thai Foreign Minister informed the Ceylon embassy affirmatively, indicating his intention to consult with the other foreign ministers on this proposal. That same evening, the Thai Foreign Minister informed the Sri Lankan Embassy that the member states were "happy" to include Sri Lanka as a founding member, pending a formal written request. Given a grace period, Sri Lankan High Commissioner to Singapore, Canagaratnam Gunasingham, awaited a response from the government. However, no such application materialized within the timeframe, prompting the meeting to proceed before the deadline, as the Thai hosts preferred auspicious timing for the organization's establishment.

During this time period, Ceylon actually managed to send two ministers to apply for membership in the regional organization on August 6, just two days before the signing, waiting in an adjacent room to the signing itself. However, Thanat Khoman, then Minister of Foreign Affairs of Thailand, stated that it was Singapore's former Foreign Minister, S. Rajaratnam, who denounced and shut down Ceylon's inclusion to ASEAN at the Bang Saen Beach meeting where the first meeting was held. Rajaratnam himself is of Jaffna Tamil-Sri Lankan decent. Sompong Sucharitkul, an aide of Thailand's then foreign minister Thanat Khoman, conveys Rajaratnam's stance on ASEAN membership for Sri Lanka in 1967:

"I remember one was an economics minister. He waited there anxiously for a signal to join the discussion; but it never came. It was Rajaratnam of Singapore who opposed the inclusion of Sri Lanka. He argued the country's domestic situation was unstable and there would be trouble. Not good for a new organisation."

In his memoir, former president of Singapore, S. R. Nathan, noted Malaysia's high eagerness to include Ceylon as a member. A significant participant in the Singapore delegation led by S. Rajaratnam, the Minister for Foreign Affairs, tasked with finalizing ASEAN's objectives and aspirations, was taken aback at Malaysia's suggestion. Both political figures cites Rajaratnam's reservations about Ceylon's domestic stability, which he believed could negatively impact the newly established organization. Indonesia, the Philippines, and Thailand did not press the matter and showed little interest in challenging the issue. According to Canagaratnam Gunasingham, however, those countries were nonetheless sympathetic to Ceylon's admission to ASEAN, particularly Thanat Khoman, who, after discussing the matter with him, appeared receptive to the idea.

The Singaporean thinktank, ISEAS Institute, added the fact that Singapore's delegation was among the senior officials chosen to decide on the matter by the chairman of the ASEAN Standing Committee led to Ceylon's membership bid getting sidelined during the signing of the Bangkok Declaration. To observations made by American diplomats, it seemed that the founding members did not deem Ceylon "deserving of the privilege of being a charter member." Consequently, action on Ceylon's application had been delayed. Even so, neither S. Rajaratnam nor the other founding members of ASEAN barred Ceylon from joining. To Sompong Sucharitkul, he believes that the country would inevitably join ASEAN one day.

This uncertainty of joining ASEAN might be that of geopolitical factor. Policy strategists in Colombo were particularly mindful of their northern neighbor, India. Sri Lankan leaders, especially those of Sinhalese ethnicity, held reservations regarding India's foreign policy objectives. This apprehension was significant, leading to a palpable aversion to any suggestion of close ties with India. Given the Western-leaning inclinations of influential Sri Lankan figures and their apprehensions toward India, it was understandable that Colombo expressed interest in joining ASEAN. At the time, the member nations of ASEAN adhered to anti-communist principles and maintained pro-Western foreign policy stances. This resonance with the political ideology prevalent among Sri Lankan leaders made ASEAN an appealing prospect for collaboration.

While member states of ASEAN generally aligned with the United States, India exhibited reserved interest in the association. However, India's stance was less critical compared to China's vehement opposition, branding ASEAN as a tool of U.S. imperialism. Despite optimistic assertions, discerning Indian observers noted significant divergences among ASEAN members. In a telegram dated 14 January 1970 from the U.S. Embassy in Australia to the Department of State, Indonesian Foreign Minister and ASEAN founding figure Adam Malik observed that Ceylon was unlikely to join ASEAN because its trade with China was considered too important to risk by the then government. President S. R. Nathan later stated that Sri Lanka's former high commissioner, Canagaratnam Gunasingham, blamed the pressure exerted to the Ceylon government by Leftist groups inside and outside the country. Additionally, India applied significant pressure on the Ceylon government. Ceylon sought to diminish India's influence by joining ASEAN, a move that was met with disapproval from India. Eventually, Ceylon turned down its membership bid and chose to maintain its commitment to non-alignment. Reflecting on this outcome, Canagaratnam later stated, "Sri Lanka's hope of breaking away from its moorings in South Asia and becoming a trading nation with links to Southeast and East Asian nations, as well as to all of littoral Asia, was lost."

=== 1981 attempt ===
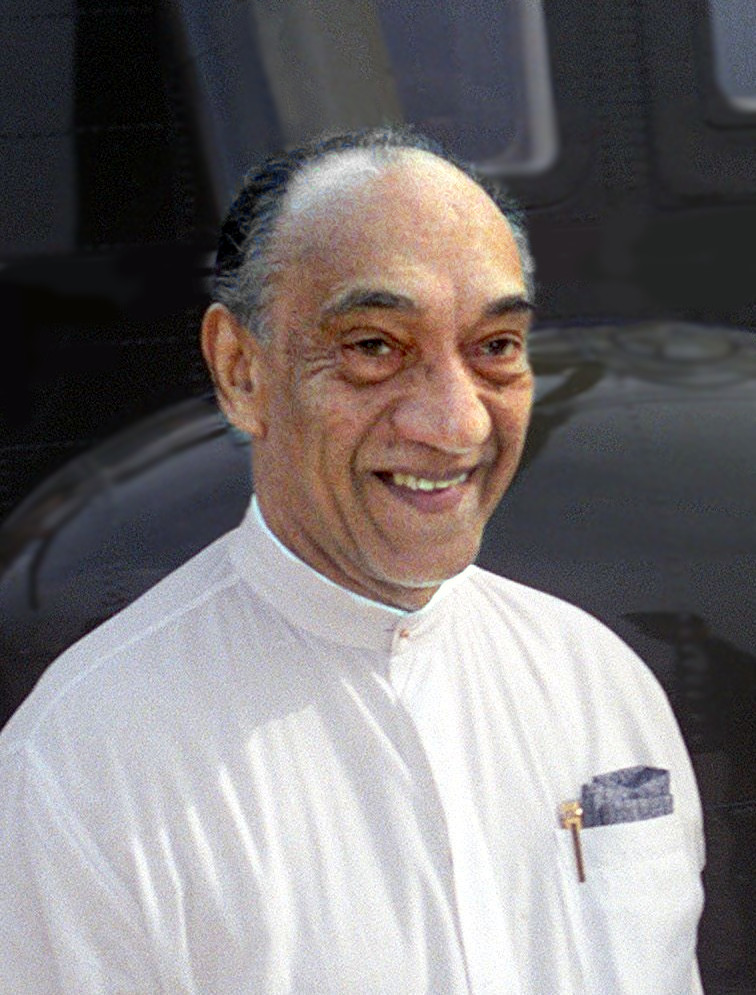
J. R. Jayawardene, Prime minister and President of Sri Lanka, saw rapprochement to ASEAN as a way to reform and bolster the national economy

In 1981, the idea of joining ASEAN once again resurfaced. Spearheaded by the country's, now Sri Lanka, elected Prime Minister, J. R. Jayewardene. At Jayewardene's tenure, he implemented a series of reforms aimed at liberalizing the economy and encouraging foreign investment. Opening Sri Lanka's economy brought the country out of the economic turmoil Sri Lanka was facing as the result of the preceding closed statist economic policies. Jayewardene felt compelled to look towards ASEAN to bolster the Sri Lankan economy because India's foreign policy rendered economic cooperation with India unfeasible. To advance Sri Lanka's bid, Jayewardene approached then Prime Minister of Malaysia, Abdul Razak Hussein, to advocate for Sri Lanka's membership in ASEAN. Unfortunately, the Malaysian Prime Minister passed away before they could convene, leaving Sri Lanka's aspirations unfulfilled. As Jayewardene became president, Ranasinghe Premadasa was elected to be the incumbent Prime Minister and continued on Jayewardene's ASEAN rapprochement. During this brief period of time, the flexibility of a non-alignment that accommodates so many national varieties allowed for a gradual reconciliation of these opposing interests. Sri Lankan academics refer to the post-Havana Conference period as 'the Aseanisation' of the country's foreign policy, with much of Sri Lanka's foreign policy followed similarly to ASEAN's member states.

In the 1970s, ASEAN had a substantial trade surplus with South Asia, holding a significant trade imbalance and sway over South Asian nations. As a way to bolster economic ties with Southeast Asian nations, Prime Minister Ranasinghe Premadasa toured Southeast Asia, mainly visiting ASEAN countries. Hearing reports that ASEAN was open on expansion and is rumored to be inviting Brunei to the organization on 1983 and possibly making observer status available to selected countries during his trip to the Philippines, he openly state to the Philippine media of Sri Lanka's wish to join ASEAN. This statement raised eyebrows in New Delhi, as it came just weeks before the first South Asian ministerial meeting to discuss the formation of a South Asian forum proposed by Bangladesh. Even so, reaproachment seemed to halt when Deputy Prime Minister S. Rajaratnam stated again that Sri Lanka could not be granted full membership in ASEAN due to its geographical location in South Asia. Arguing that allowing Sri Lanka to join might set a precedent for other South Asian countries, such as Pakistan, to seek membership. He did however suggested that Sri Lanka could instead be offered "observer" or "dialogue status" within the organization.

=== 21st century developments ===
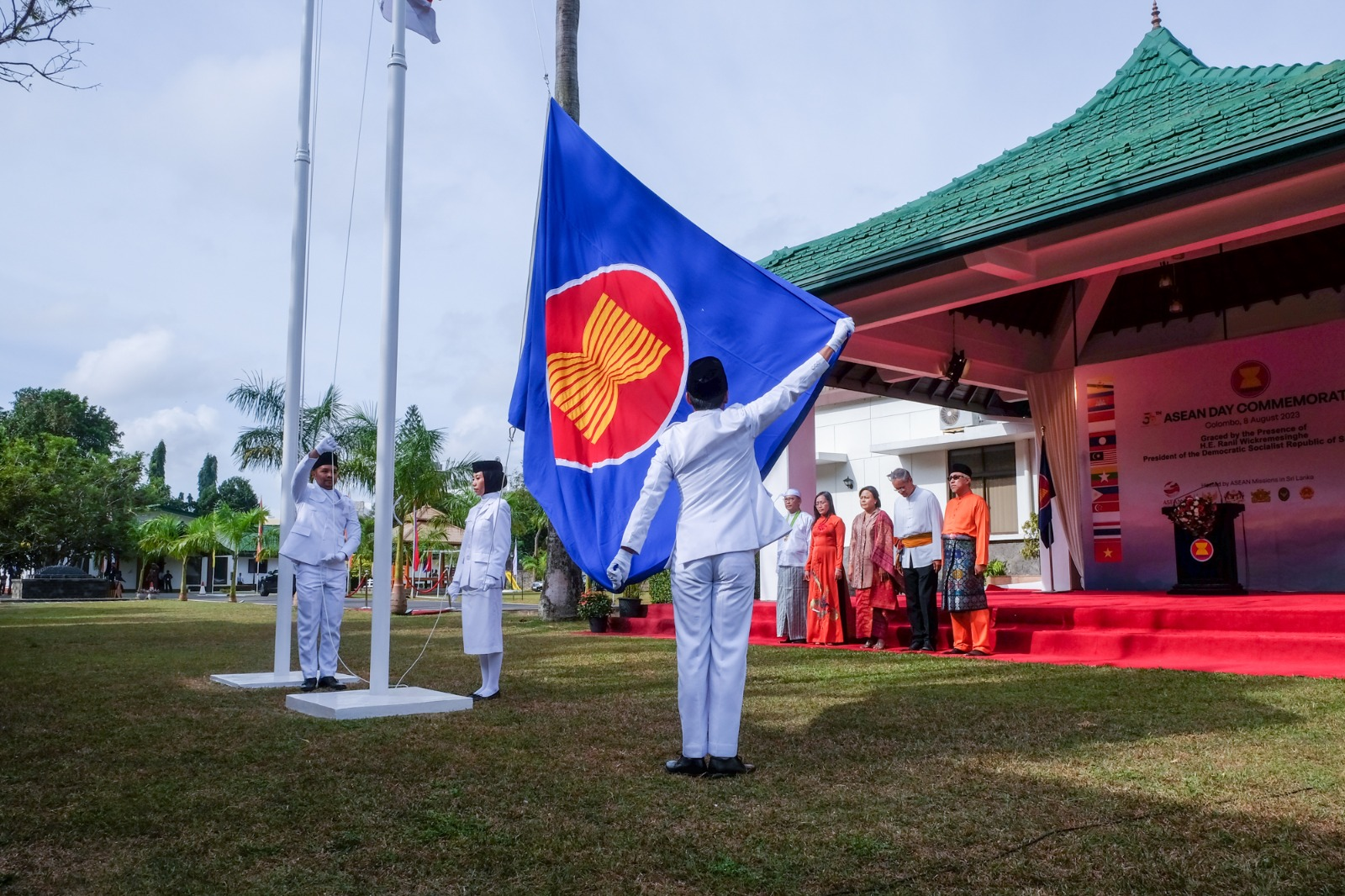
ASEAN flag raising in Colombo, Sri Lanka

In 2007, Sri Lanka was among the 27 participants in the ARF.

In 2018, there were explicit talk from the Sri Lankan leadership about moving toward observer status as a political goal. Ranil Wickremesinghe, then acting president of Sri Lanka, held some interest in obtaining observer status as a way to advance the Sri Lankan economy.

In 2023, President Ranil Wickremesinghe met with ASEAN ambassadors in Colombo to celebrate ASEAN's 56th Anniversary. During the meet, Wickremesinghe announced plans to initiate negotiations for the establishment of free trade agreements with ASEAN member countries, intending to join the Regional Comprehensive Economic Partnership (RCEP) free trade agreement. Unexpectedly, Ranil Wickremesinghe expressed profound regret over Sri Lanka declining an invitation to join ASEAN in its early years, citing missed opportunities for economic prosperity. Wickremesinghe acknowledged that turning down the opportunity to join ASEAN led to a period of socialist economic policies and recently led to an economic crisis and the subsequent bankruptcy of the nation, hindering the country's growth potential and limited capital formations. Wickremesinghe emphasized the importance and need for unity, cooperation, and closer ties with ASEAN, possibly even hinting a future membership bid.

On 15 March 2025, the Minister of Foreign Affairs Vijitha Hearth announced that Sri Lanka applied for ASEAN Sectoral Dialogue Partnership.

== See also ==
- History of ASEAN
- Enlargement of ASEAN
  - Accession of Bangladesh to ASEAN
  - Accession of Papua New Guinea to ASEAN
  - Accession of Timor-Leste to ASEAN (fulfilled)
