= Thida Yu Mon =

Female pro-military militia leader

- သီတာယုမွန်
- Born: Mawlamyine, Mon State, Myanmar
- Spouse: Sein Lwin (married 2003; reported divorce 2021)
- Children: 2 daughters
- Military career
- Allegiance: State Administration Council, Tatmadaw
- Service years: 2021–present
- Rank: Militia leader
- Unit: Myingyan Pyusawhti militia forces
- Conflicts: Myanmar civil war * Myingyan District engagements
- Awards: Ye Bala Medal (3 July 2025)

Thida Yu Mon (Burmese: သီတာယုမွန်) is a Burmese pro-military militia leader and former restaurant performer. She is the leader of a Pyusawhti militia group based in Myingyan Township, Mandalay Region, and a former local chair of the military-backed Union Solidarity and Development Party (USDP). Following the 2021 Myanmar coup d'état, she gained prominence for organizing paramilitary operations against anti-junta resistance forces, particularly the People's Defense Force (PDF).

== Political and militia leadership ==
She was active in local politics as a member of the Union Solidarity and Development Party (USDP) in Mandalay Region. She served as the chair of Myingyan Township USDP. Before her activities as a militia leader, she was reported to have worked as a performer at local restaurants.

Following the 2021 military coup and the subsequent armed resistance, Thida Yu Mon formed several Thway Thout (Blood Comrades) vigilante groups. She later emerged as a key organizer of the Myingyan Pyusawhti militias, a network of pro-junta militias established to counter the People's Defence Force (PDF) and other resistance groups. She is reported to have considerable influence in Myingyan District, an area regarded as strategically important in the ongoing conflict. Resistance forces have described the township as central to control of the wider region, stating that gaining control of Myingyan would effectively determine control over Central Myanmar. The area has therefore been the focus of major offensives, including the "Myingyan District Special Operation" launched by the National Unity Government's Ministry of Defence. Due to the district's strategic importance, junta authorities have supplied her militia with weapons and ammunition. During clashes in the area, junta forces have also provided air support to operations involving her group. Her faction operates primarily in Myingyan, Taungtha, and Ngazun townships.

Following reported resistance gains during Operation 1027, Thida Yu Mon was said to have shifted tactics to include efforts aimed at persuading members of the People's Defence Force to defect. According to resistance sources, she contacted some PDF members by phone and through online channels to encourage them to surrender. Bo Maik Khe, a leader of the Myingyan Black Tiger (MBT) group, stated that she personally called him to urge his surrender. Her militia has also been accused by resistance groups of threatening and pressuring the families of fighters in an effort to compel defections.

In March 2025, Thida Yu Mon began leading militia training specifically for women in Myingyan, Saw, Taungtha, and Natogyi townships. She reportedly recruits women by promising them exemption from the military junta's upcoming conscription law. Recruits are also offered civil service salaries and financial assistance for their families. Her militia force, which previously numbered around 700, reportedly grew to over 1,000 members (combined male and female) following this recruitment drive.

She has been targeted in multiple subsequent attacks by members of the People's Defence Force, though these attempts were unsuccessful. She was reportedly unharmed in grenade attacks on her residence and in a previous roadside bomb attack in which the vehicle she was travelling in was struck and thrown onto nearby bushes.

On January 14, 2026, her husband Sein Lwin was arrested by the Myingyan District PDF (Battalion No. 3) while traveling on the Myingyan–Bagan road. Resistance forces reported seizing 200 methamphetamine (WY) tablets and official militia identification documents during the arrest. Following his capture, she reportedly led a search in Myingyan town, inspecting local KTVs and restaurants in an attempt to locate him.

== Human rights and violence allegations ==
Thida Yu Mon has been described in media reports as responsible for acts of violence against civilians. Due to her cruelty, Thida Yu Mon has been described by Myingyan locals as the second most ruthless tyrant after military leader Min Aung Hlaing. She has also been reported to oversee internal checkpoints within Myingyan Township, where villagers and visitors were required to register and obtain recommendation letters issued by her group in order to enter Myingyan town.

Landowners and members of local administrative bodies have alleged that Thida Yu Mon demanded large payments in connection with land sales in Myingyan, sometimes amounting to thousands of lakhs of kyats. According to these sources, when grant land or ancestral land was subdivided and sold, sellers were required to pay at least 10 percent of the land’s value. Failure to make such payments reportedly resulted in the destruction of boundary fences and the harassment or eviction of buyers who had taken residence on the purchased land.

Local media alleged that Thida Yu Mon's militia was involved in arrests, raids, and violence against civilians in villages around Myingyan. According to residents cited in media reports, approximately 20 victims were individually identified among those confirmed killed.

A source cited by Mizzima reported that a man was killed during a joint operation by junta forces and a Pyusawhti group in a village in Myingyan. According to the report, the victim was burned and beheaded, and his body parts were left in separate locations. The killing was attributed to a Pyusawhti unit led by Thida Yu Mon. The same sources reported that at least 26 people were killed in the incident, including civilians who were beheaded, as well as pregnant women and children. Homes in no fewer than 10 villages were reportedly burned, and civilian houses were looted and subjected to extortion.

On 28 July 2025, Thida Yu Mon reportedly demanded 2,000,000 kyats from a village administrator Tun Maw Oo for food and operational expenses. According to reports, when Tun Maw Oo's wife refused to provide the money, Thida Yu Mon allegedly slapped and physically assaulted her.

== Awards and recognition ==
In recognition of her support for nationalist and Buddhist causes aligned with the military administration, she was awarded the title of Mangala Dhamma Mani Jotadhara (မင်္ဂလဓမ္မမဏိဇောတဓရ) by the Young Men's Buddhist Association (YMBA).

On 3 July 2025, she was awarded the Ye Bala Medal, the third-highest decoration of the Myanmar Police Force, in recognition of bravery and performance by the State Administration Council.

== Personal life ==
Thida Yu Mon is not a native of Myingyan; she is originally from Mawlamyine, Mon State. In 2003, she married Sein Lwin, a native of Myingyan who is reported to come from a wealthy family. He later served as her deputy in the Myingyan Pyusawhti militia. After his capture by People's Defence Force (PDF) members, she wrote on social media that he was her former husband and that they had divorced in 2021. Local sources reported that despite the reported divorce they continued to live in the same house and have two daughters.
