= Myanmar–Sri Lanka relations =

- Myanmar: Sri Lanka

Diplomatic mission
- Embassy of Myanmar, Colombo: Embassy of Sri Lanka, Yangon

Myanmar–Sri Lanka relations are the bilateral relations between Myanmar and Sri Lanka. The two countries have had relations for centuries, sharing many historical, cultural and religious ties as majority Theravada Buddhist countries. Myanmar was one of a few countries that Sri Lanka established resident embassies soon after independence. Myanmar, in turn, has an embassy in Colombo.

The two countries have had long historic ties, stemming from the establishment of Sri Lankan Theravada Buddhism as the first unifying religion during the Bagan Kingdom. The 15th century re-ordination of Burmese monks in Sri Lanka and the 18th century revival of more orthodox Buddhism in Sri Lanka from Burmese monks further strengthened this relationship. This religious relationship continued into modern times with the Sixth Buddhist Council. Both Sri Lanka and Myanmar were hailed internationally for their democratization in 2015 and have seen significant Buddhist nationalist movements in recent times.

== History ==
=== Ancient relations ===
Relations between people in the two areas making up modern day Sri Lanka and Myanmar date back to the 4th century where the earliest Myanmar. In the 11th century, when Anawrahta conquered the Pyu city-states and Thaton Kingdom, forming the Bagan Kingdom in Myanmar. The generally held belief within Myanmar is that a Bhikkhu (monk) named Shin Arahan from Thaton introduced Theravada Buddhism to the Bagan Kingdom. Later historical chronicles, particularly the Sāsanavaṃsa, state that Shin Arahan had originally come from Sri Lanka in the continuous lineage of monks travelling between the Thaton Kingdom and Sri Lanka since the 5th century. Anawrahta invited monks from Sri Lanka, among others, after banishing Ari priests in an attempt to revitalize a more orthodox form of Buddhism.

Vijayabahu I of Polonnaruwa sent a copy of the Tripitaka to Anawrahta. Buddhist scriptures throughout the Bagan period were written and studied through the Sinhala script, with the Sinhala Tripitaka being strictly adhered to as far forward as the Sixth Buddhist Council in 1956.

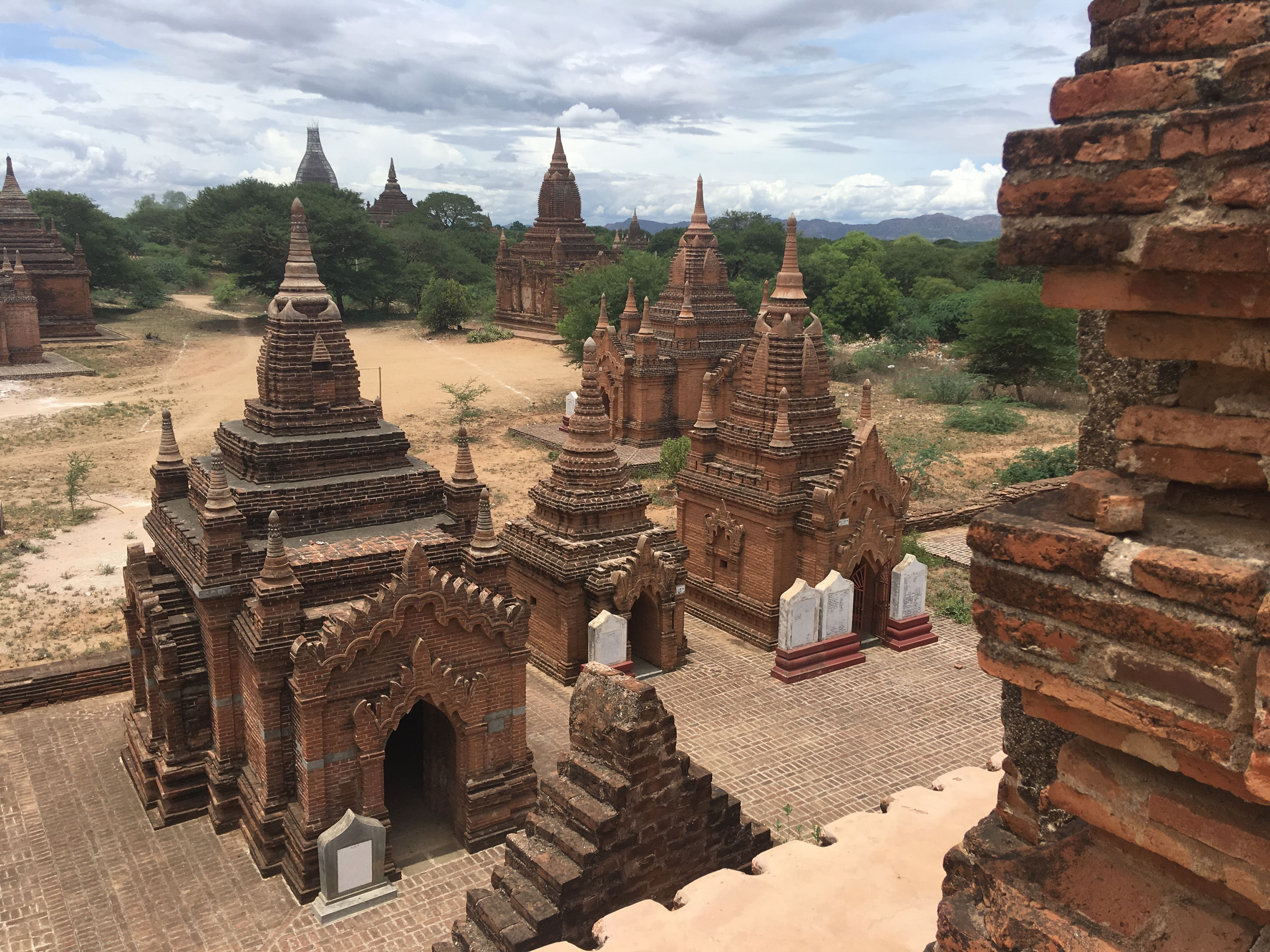
Temples in Myinkaba, Bagan

In the 1150s, the Burmese king Sithu I visited the court of Parakramabahu I in Sri Lanka appointing an ambassador. Burmese chronicles state that Sithu married a daughter of Parakramabahu. However, the Sri Lankan chronicle Cūḷavaṃsa records that Sithu caught sight of a letter addressed to the King of Cambodia. He attempted to stop Sri Lanka's elephant trade with Cambodia and later captured a lesser Sinhalese princess on her way to be married to a prince of Cambodia, sparking a war between the two kingdoms in 1180.

In 1171, a group of Burmese monks visited Sri Lanka led by Shin Uttarajiva. Upon their return, they refused to accept the validity of the Shin Arahan-derived Kanchipuram-Thaton school, creating a schism. The king, Naratheinkha supported the new monks and Burmese Buddhism was realigned to the Mahavihara school from Sri Lanka. Both Narahtheinkha and his successor Sithu II would send numerous monks to be re-ordained in Sri Lanka. Sithu II would re-establish friendly relations with the revival of a Sinhala monastic tradition by building several monasteries dedicated to Sri Lankan monks, particularly in the town of Myinkaba.

=== Medieval ===
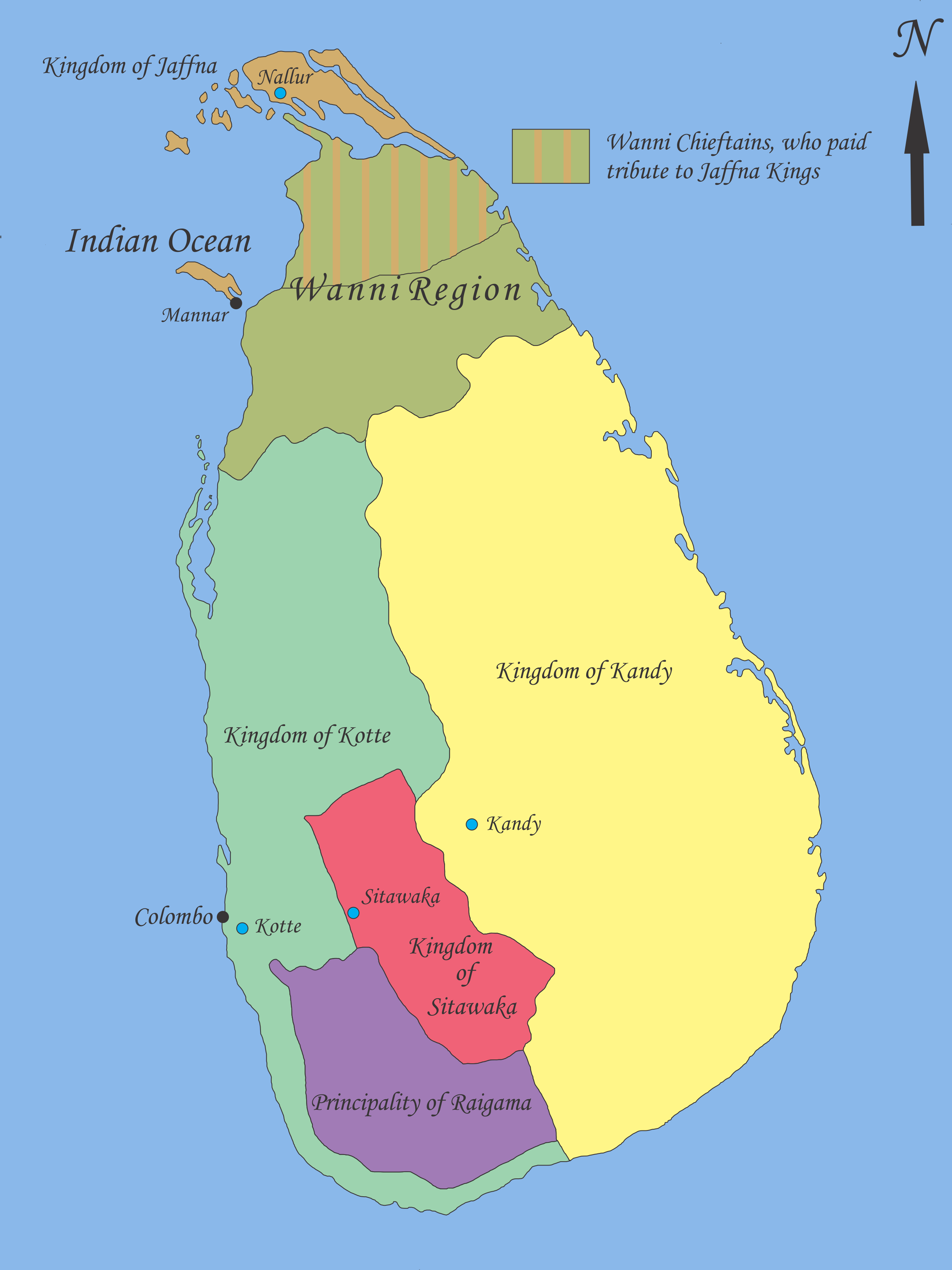
16th century Sri Lanka

There was continuous religious contact and exchange between the various successors to the Bagan Kingdom. Sri Lankan monks contributed heavily to the scholarship of the Kingdom of Ava. Most prominently, King Dhammazedi of the Hanthawaddy kingdom was educated in a Sinhala Sangha monastery in Ava before his accession to the throne in 1471. In the Kalyani Inscriptions, Dhammazedi proclaimed that the religion in Burma had grown farther from its original purity due to sectarianism and that, to emulate Anawrahta, Sithu II and Parakramabhau I, he had sent all the monks in Lower Burma to be re-ordained on the Kalyani river in Sri Lanka. This re-ordination, combined with the dominance of Mon culture in the religious affairs of the entire area, made Sri Lankan Theravada Buddhism the dominant form of Buddhism in Myanmar.

In the 16th century, the various disunited polities of Myanmar were conquered by Bayinnaung, who established the First Toungoo Empire. By 1576, his conquests had been so absolute that no one wanted to challenge his rule. Rival Sri Lankan kingdoms were keen to receive his support as Bayinnaung viewed himself the protector of Theravada Buddhism sending many presents to the Tooth of Kandy. In 1573, Dharmapala of Kotte sent his daughter to be wed to Bayinnaung. After Dharmapala converted to Catholicism, sent what he claimed to be the real Tooth relic in 1576 in return for 2,500 well-trained men from the Toungoo Empire to Colombo, easily defeating a rebellion that had been threatening Dharmapala.

=== Early Modern relations ===
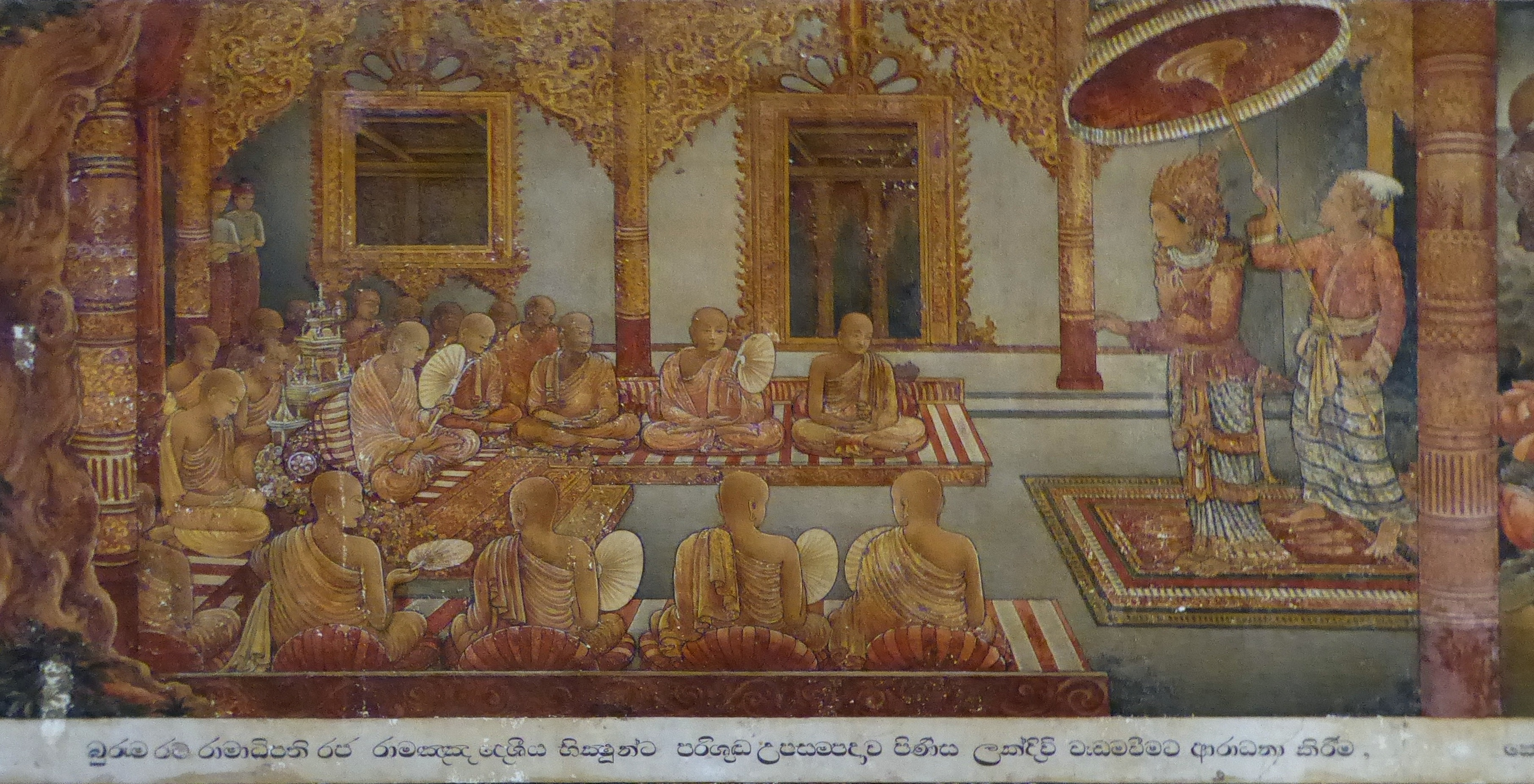
King of Burma inviting Sri Lankan Ramañña Monks to ordained

In the late 18th century, King Bodawpaya of the Konbaung dynasty resurged Buddhism in Myanmar and placed regulations on the monkhood. Bodawpaya re-introduced the upasampadā ordination system to Sri Lanka, establishing the Amarapura Nikaya in a mirror to earlier Burmese-Sri Lankan ordinations. The monkhood order in Sri Lanka had become extinct thrice before this introduction where the Vinaya had been abandoned by some monks in the Kingdom of Kandy. The establishment of the Amarapura Nikaya was also significant as a monastic lineage was established through collective action rather than the patronage of a king, as had been the case in Sri Lanka previously. According to Heinz Bechert, this eventually led to Buddhist modernism in postcolonial Sri Lanka, where the role of the sangha was reduced in favour of reinterpreting Buddhism as a scientific religion.

Both Sri Lanka and Myanmar came under the rule of the British Empire. While Burma was integrated into the British Raj, Sri Lanka remained a separate crown colony as British Ceylon.

=== Modern relations ===
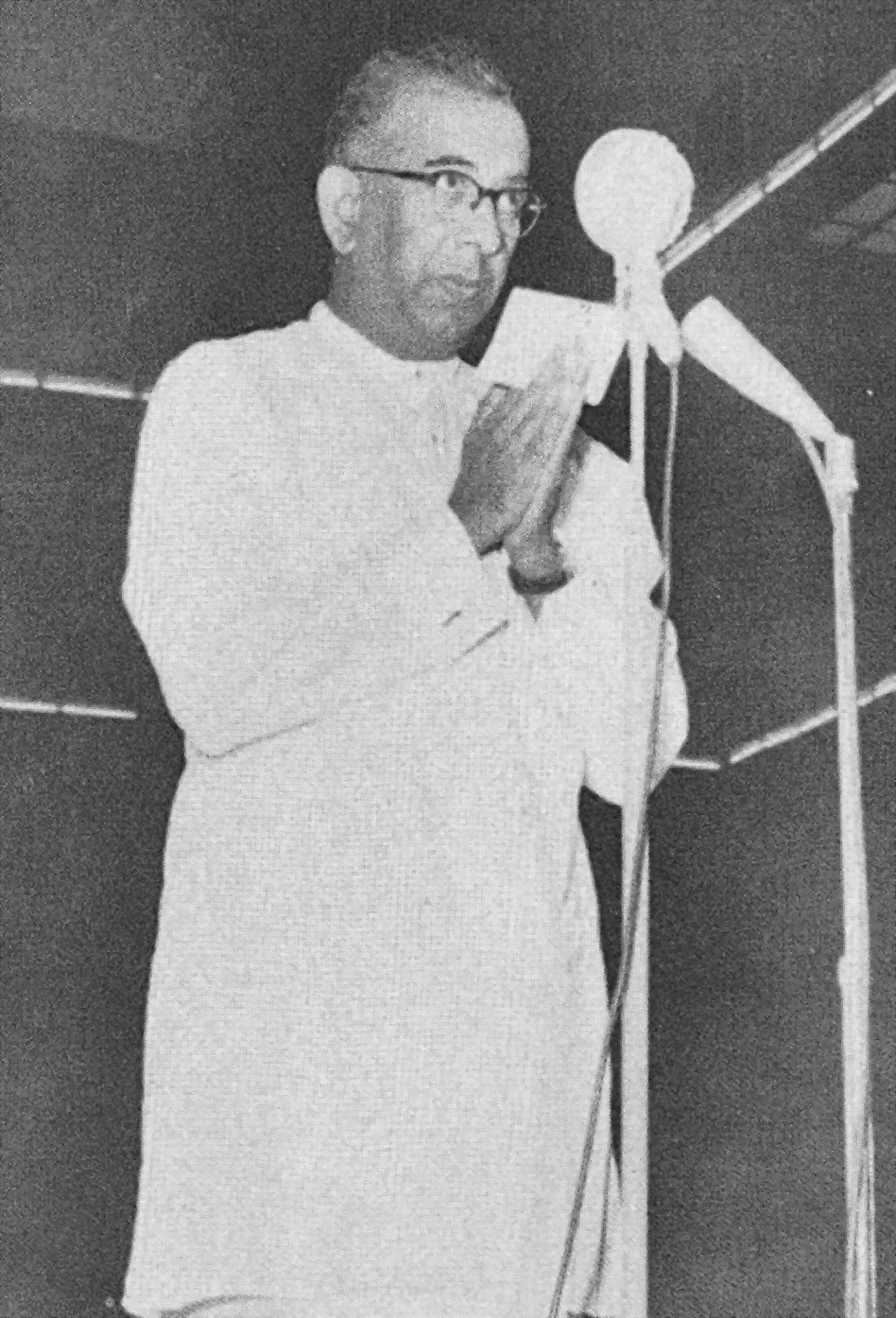
Jayaweera Kuruppu reads a message from Prime Minister Bandaranaike at the Sixth Buddhist Council in Rangoon, 1956

In 1949, soon after the independence of both countries, resident embassies were quickly established. The two countries continued their history of religious exchange during the Sixth Buddhist Council, hosted by Burma from 1954 to 1956. The Sri Lankan delegation played a leading role in the deliberations of the council, attended by 2500 monks.

The first state visit between the two post-colonial countries was in 1966 when Ne Win visited Sri Lanka. Prime Minister Sirimavo Bandaranaike paid Sri Lanka's first official visit to Myanmar in 1976. In the 1976 visit, a joint commission for bilateral cooperation was established.

In 2004, Myanmar hosted the fourth World Buddhist Summit, a convention of monks first held in 1998 Japan. Due to boycotts over the military junta's human rights record, Japan's Nenbutsushu sect boycotted the meeting. However, the prime minister of Sri Lanka Mahinda Rajapaksa made an appearance at the conference with Myanmar's leader Than Shwe.

=== Recent relations ===
The growth of Buddhist nationalism in both Sri Lanka and Myanmar during the 2010s, prompted media coverage to group the Bodu Bala Sena (BBS) and the 969 Movement in each respective country together. While both groups formed in response to major political changes and gained momentum from increased global anti-Muslim sentiment, they differ in BBS's self-conscious approach towards Buddhist modernism. Juliane Schober, a religion scholar, argues that this similarity between Myanmar and Sri Lanka's politically active Buddhist sanghas stretches back to 1988 and more generally to the disruption of similar traditional state-religion relations by similar British colonial practices. In the wake of the 2017 Rohingya genocide, Sri Lanka accepted Rohingya asylum seekers. The asylum seekers had detained by the Sri Lankan navy after being found on an Indian boat in Sri Lankan waters. However, hard-line nationalists and monks attacked a shelter where they were being housed, forcing its Rohingya occupants to flee.

During Myanmar's economic liberalisation of the 2010s, Myanmar and Sri Lanka furthered trade ties, signing joint trade agreements and cooperating on many development issues through the Bay of Bengal Initiative for Multi-Sectoral Technical and Economic Cooperation. Sri Lankan President Maithripala Sirisena emphasized the two countries' similarities as Theravada Buddhist countries with an agricultural economy stating that Sri Lanka was a true friend of Myanmar ready to provide assistance in international forums. The moderate risk of secession both countries faced in the 2010s also made reform towards federalism, or quasi-federalism, and building federal institutions a shared political goal.

Both Sri Lanka and Myanmar were hailed internationally for their democratisation in 2015 and, after a period of growing nationalism, have faced setbacks recently. In Myanmar, the 2021 Myanmar coup d'état returned the country to both military rule and violent civil war. In Sri Lanka, President Gotabaya Rajapaksa increased militarisation of the government, garnering criticism from the United Nations. Despite the subsequent Myanmar civil war and international condemnation against the Myanmar junta, Sri Lanka strengthened diplomatic ties by presenting diplomatic credentials to Prime Minister Senior General Min Aung Hlaing on 7 June 2022.

=== Support during Cyclone Ditwah ===
Myanmar sent Shaanxi Y-8 of Myanmar Air Force with relief supplies to Colombo after Cyclone Ditwah. Consignment includes sanitary items, medical supplies, and other essential goods. Sri Lanka’s Ambassador to Myanmar, the Director General of Myanmar’s Ministry of Foreign Affairs, and several other government representatives were present at the official handover of the aid.

== Trade and Economy ==
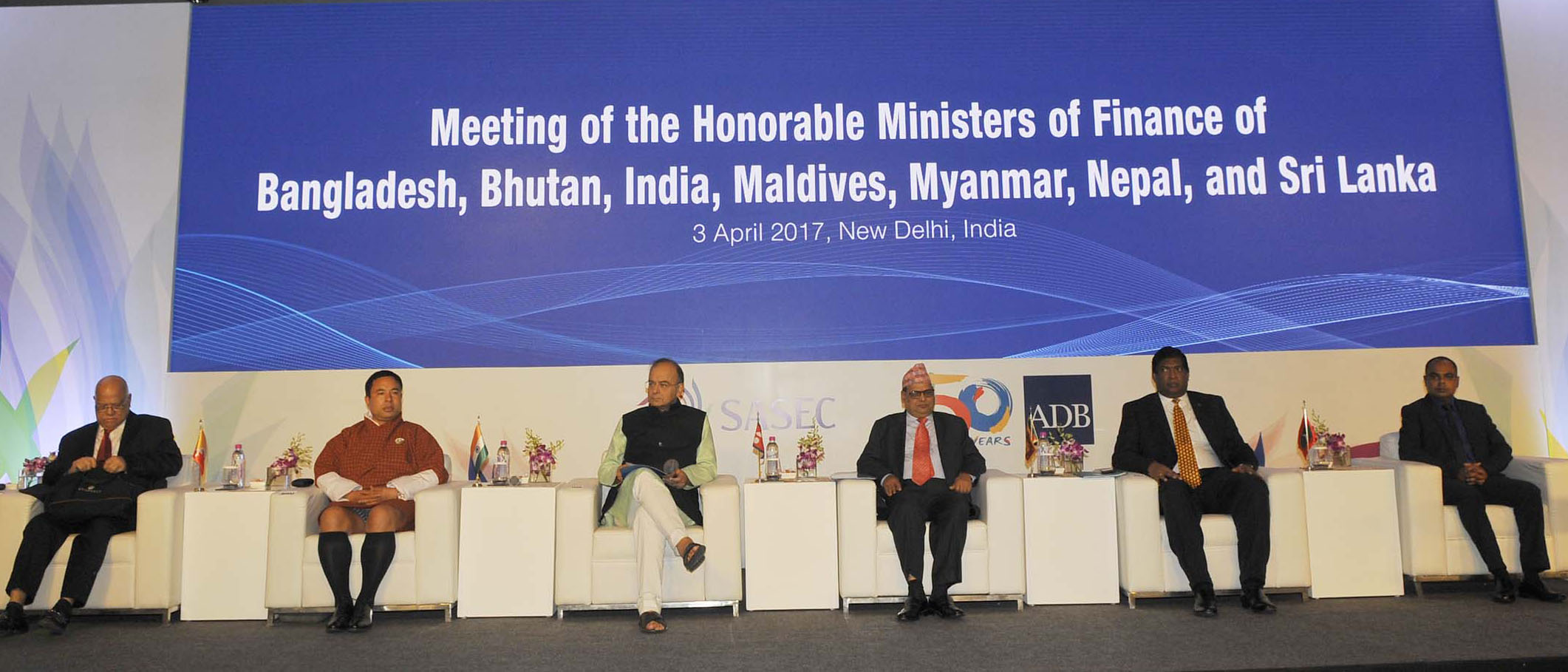
Finance Ministers of Myanmar and Sri Lanka, among others, at the SASEC Finance Ministers’ meeting, in New Delhi

Since 1999, Myanmar established stronger trade ties with Sri Lanka as part of the State Peace and Development Council's market-orientated reforms. Myanmar exports rice, wood, pulses, beans, gems, jewellery, rubber and fishery products while importing rice, maize, apparel, paint, rubber and porcelain from Sri Lanka. Bilateral trade between the two countries grew from US$2.8 million in 2009 to $82 million in 2017. This growth in trade comes from key bilateral deals between the Union of Myanmar Federation of Chambers of Commerce and Industry and Sri Lanka's Ministry of Industries.

Myanmar and Sri Lanka are also involved in many multilateral economic groups, such as the South Asia Subregional Economic Cooperation, which Sri Lanka joined in 2014 and Myanmar joined in 2017.

== Diplomatic missions ==
Republic of the Union of Myanmar

- Colombo (Embassy)

Democratic Socialist Republic of Sri Lanka

- Yangon (Embassy)

== See also ==
- Sri Lankan Ambassador to Myanmar
