= May Sabai Phyu =

Kachin activist from Myanmar

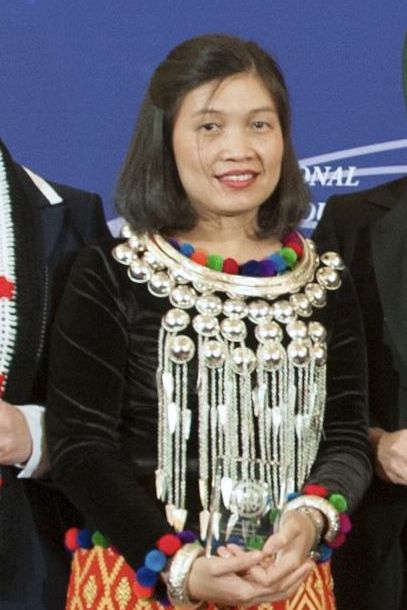
May Sabe Phyu (Burma) accepts the International Women of Courage Award in 2015

May Sabai Phyu (Burmese: မေစံပယ်ဖြူ, also transcribed as May Sabe Phyu, Kachin: Lashi Labya Hkawn Htoi; born 5 August 1976) is a Kachin activist from Burma. She is active in promoting human rights, freedom of expression, peace, justice for Myanmar's ethnic minorities and anti-violence in Kachin State, and lately in combating violence against women and promoting gender equality issues.

== Early life ==
Phyu was born in Yangon, Myanmar, on 5 August 1976 of Kachin mother and Burmese father. She is the eldest daughter of four siblings. She married Patrick Kum Ja Lee and the couple has three children - two daughters and a son.

== Career ==
Phyu has a Bachelor of Science (Mathematics) degree from the University of Distance Education, Yangon, and a master's degree in Gender and Development Studies from Thailand's Asian Institute of Technology, where her thesis explored the gendered health impacts of the widely opposed Myitsone Dam construction in Kachin State, Myanmar. She has worked with UNDP as a Health Education Specialist, and with MSF-Holland in a variety of roles, including as a Health Education Supervisor and as Team Leader of the Counseling Program of HIV/AIDS Care and Support for the people living with HIV/AIDS.

In 2008, she was instrumental in forming the inter-agency Women's Protection Technical Working Group during the Cyclone Nargis response. The group was formed to alleviate hardships caused by the storm. Immediately, the storm changed household composition, leaving 14 out of every 100 households headed by women, the majority of these being widows. In addition, there was a sharp rise in the number of women engaging in sex for money, food or favors. As these households were vulnerable, both in terms of poverty and safety, the group immediately focused on methods to provide satisfactory housing, sex education, job training and support networks. Due to the group's efforts, eighteen months after the cyclone, conditions for these vulnerable women appeared to have returned to normalcy.

After the disaster relief situation stabilized, the Working Group evolved into the Gender Equality Network, with May Sabai Phyu as Senior Coordinator. In 2012, this group assisted the government in the drafting of the National Strategic Plan for the Advancement of Women. The organization actively works for gender equality and the development of strategies to mitigate and prevent violence against women and girls. As Director of the Gender Equality Network, May Sabe Phyu carries out broad and high level advocacy on women's rights and gender equality issues, and oversees the implementation of the network's strategic initiatives to promote equitable national policy. She has played a major role in taking the network to a new stage of high-impact, evidence-based advocacy through the production of actionable research.

Phyu has been instrumental in the network's development of two groundbreaking research projects: a qualitative research study on violence against women; and analysis of gender-based social practices and cultural norms within the Myanmar context. The completion of Behind the Silence: Violence Against Women and their Resilience marks a major step in advancing awareness of and action towards ending violence against women in Myanmar; this study is one of the first to systematically examine incidents of violence against women in the general population and to provide analysis on the different types of violence, its consequences, causes, and women's coping strategies. A second pioneering study on social and cultural practices and their impact on gender equality examines historical narratives and contemporary cultural and religious views of women and men in Myanmar, including cultural changes and ways in which norms influence attitudes and behaviour. The study called Raising the Curtain: Cultural Norms, Social Practices and Gender Equality in Myanmar describes stereotypes and perceptions of women in the economy, education, sport, health, and the media. The report suggests ways in which specific sectors and broader movements can identify and shift pervasive cultural discourse and practices that pose barriers to women's empowerment.

Through the network, May Sabe Phyu is currently co-coordinating a law reform process with various stakeholders to draft the country's first law on the prevention of violence against women by creating new criminal offenses for a variety of types of violence, civil remedies, and a regime for implementation of the law - including education and training programs, and new justice system and dispute resolution procedures. The proposed new law covers a number of issues not currently addressed, such as marital rape, incest, stalking, technology-related violence against women and the establishment of protection orders.

Phyu has also played a leading role in opposing the highly controversial draft Race and Religion Protection Laws, which was approved in 2015, and has major implications for women's rights in Myanmar. The proposed bill infringes on freedom of religion and specifically targets minority groups. During her campaign against the bill, she was the victim of targeted hate phone calls to her personal phone, which was often up to 100 threatening and abusive calls a night.

== Hazards of engaging in activism in Myanmar ==
After hostilities between the Kachin Independence Organization and the Myanmar army resumed in 2012, May Sabe Phyu co-founded the Kachin Peace Network and Kachin Women Peace Network to raise awareness of the situation of internally displaced persons (IDPs). She advocates for inter-ethnic trust-building and women's involvement in the peace process to resolve this civil conflict. As the co-coordinator of both organizations, she organized the first public event to raise IDP issues in the mainstream media and has conducted media exposure trips to IDP camps. Following a peaceful demonstration calling for an end to civil war in Yangon, where freedom of association is still restricted, May Sabe Phyu was charged along with a co-organizer. Over the next 14 months, they made 120 appearances in six courts, ultimately paying 20,000 kyat (approximately US$20) fines in two courts, with charges dismissed under a presidential amnesty.

On October 14, 2015, when she was abroad on an advocacy trip, Burmese Special Branch police arrested her husband Patrick Kum Jaa Lee at their home. He was sent to the country's notorious prison, Insein, without a warrant. The authority accused him of mocking the country's commander-in-chief of the armed forces, Min Aung Hlaing, on Facebook. Unlike her, Patrick Kum Jaa Lee was a humanitarian worker who had no background of outspokenness against Myanmar's government and military campaigns or joining any type of activism. On January 22, 2016, the Court found him guilty of “online defamation” and sentenced him to six months in prison. It was an example of pressure and intimidation against activists who speak out against rising anti-Muslim and ultra-nationalist Buddhist movements in the country. As May Sabe Phyu is one of the most prominent Burmese civil society activists who have criticized the passage of four so-called "race and religion protection laws" passed by Parliament in 2015, and championed by the Buddhist monk-led Association for Protection of Race and Religion, or in Burmese, Ma Ba Tha, she and many other activists have been subject to death threats and being branded ‘traitors’ by senior monks and their supporters. Her work to build peace among ethnic and religious minorities requires her to speak out against injustice, but her family is paying the price.

She has spoken at various human rights workshops in Myanmar, advocating for the rights of people with disabilities and the promotion and protection of human rights.

== Awards ==
For her leadership in advocating for the full and equal rights of women and ethnic and religious minorities in Myanmar, May Sabe Phyu was honored with an International Women of Courage Award by the State Department of the United States of America in 2015. After Zin Mar Aung, she is the second woman from Burma to receive this award. Later, she was listed as one of the inspiring women leaders in changing Myanmar's society by many local and international news media. She has also been recognized as a distinguished alumnus by the Asian Institute of Technology (AIT) Alumni Association (AITAA), Thailand, in September 2015, where she attained her first master's degree in Gender and Development Studies.

In 2018, she studied at the John F. Kennedy School of Government at Harvard University (also known as Harvard Kennedy School and HKS) for a one-year Mid-Career Public Administration program as one of the Mason fellows.
