= National Catholicism =

Part of the ideological identity of Francoism

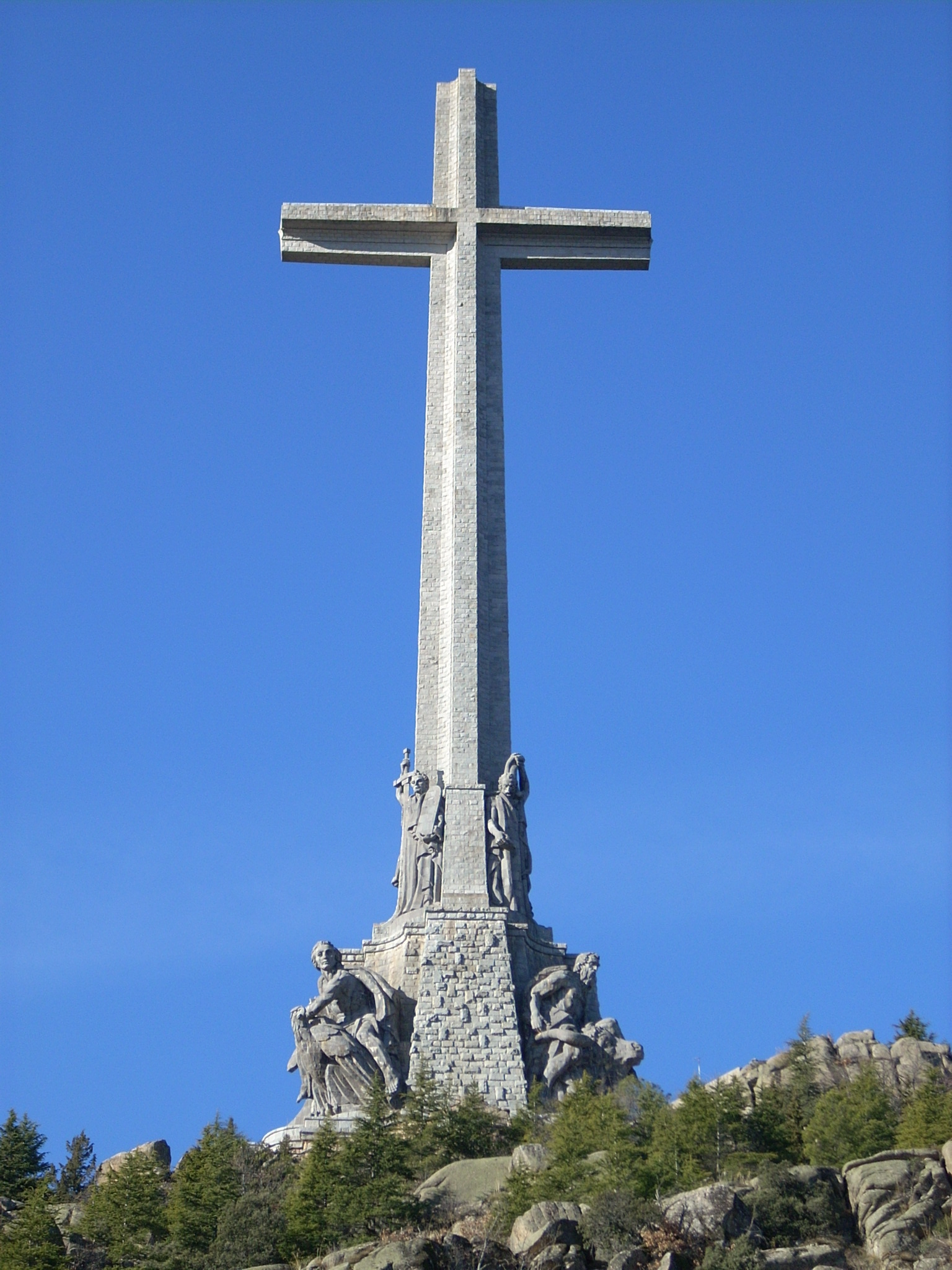
The Latin cross at the Valley of the Fallen in Spain.

National Catholicism (Spanish: nacionalcatolicismo) was part of the ideological identity of Francoism, the political system through which the Spanish dictator Francisco Franco governed the Spanish State between 1939 and 1975. Its most visible manifestation was the hegemony that the Catholic Church had in all aspects of public and private life. As a symbol of the ideological divisions within Francoism, it can be contrasted to national syndicalism (Spanish: nacionalsindicalismo), an essential component of the ideology and political practice of the Falangists.

== History ==
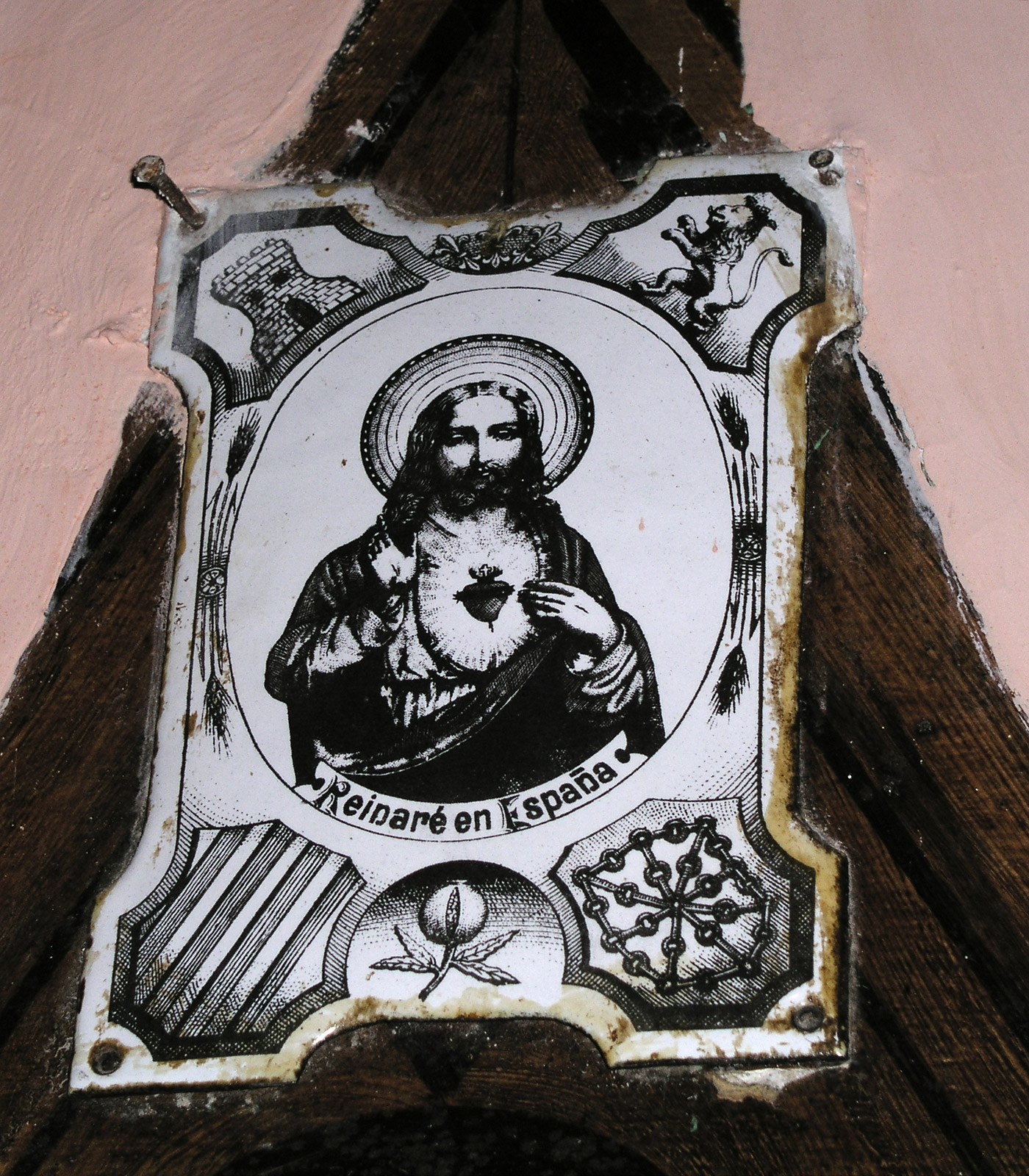
An image of the Sacred Heart, with the expression "I Shall Reign in Spain" (Spanish: Reinaré en España) inscribefd

The invention of the term is attributed to the Jesuit and historian Alfonso Álvarez Bolado, who gave the term a scientific nuance and whose articles were compiled by the publishing house Cuadernos para el Diálogo in 1976, before, the term was used more informally. In France, a similar model of National Catholicism was advanced by the Fédération Nationale Catholique formed by General Édouard Castelnau. Although it reached one million members in 1925, it was of short-lived significance, subsiding into obscurity by 1930.

In Spain, the Spanish State explicitly fused National Catholicism with elements of Fascism and National Syndicalism to create a personalist dictatorship under Franco's rule. In 1943, he initiated a project in 1943 to reform the university. It was called the University Regulatory Law (U.R.L.), which remained active until 1970.

The U.R.L. represented the clearest politicization of the university in the service of the new regime's National-Catholic precepts. While there was no explicit exclusion of women from higher learning, their presence at the university level was discouraged and not recognized during the two first decades of the regime.

In the later years of Franco's regime, National Catholicism would be emphasized more with Fascism and National Syndicalism downplayed after the defeat of the Axis powers and the start of the Cold War.

In the 1930s and 1940s, Ante Pavelić's Croatian Ustaše movement espoused a similar ideology, although it has been called other names, including "political Catholicism" and "Catholic Croatism". Other countries in central and eastern Europe where similar movements of Francoist inspiration combined Catholicism with nationalism include Austria, Poland, Lithuania, Slovakia and Slovenia.

== See also ==
- Buddhist nationalism
- Christian nationalism
- Concordat of 1953
- Hardal
- Hindu nationalism
- Integrism (Spain)
- Islamic nationalism
- Movimiento Nacional
- Religious nationalism
