= Myawaddy Sayadaw =

Burmese monk (1951–2022)

Ashin Ariyavaṃsābhivaṃsa (Burmese: အရှင် အရိယဝံသာဘိဝံသ), better known as Myawaddy Sayadaw (Burmese: မြဝတီမင်းကြီးဆရာတော်; 1951 – 27 October 2022), was a Burmese monk and the abbot of Myawaddy Mingyi monastery in Mandalay. He was a prominent vocal critic of Buddhist nationalism, the military and military-backed organizations and businesses. He faced legal action in 2019 as a result of his public criticism of the military.

== Life and movements ==
The sayadaw was born in 1951 in Myingyan, Mandalay Region, Burma. He had entered monkhood after finishing high school with outstanding grades. At the age of 26, he earned the prestigious title of Buddhist scholar, a remarkable achievement that only 11 other monks accomplished in the entire 20th century.

Myawaddy Sayadaw was known for his active participation in interfaith activities across Myanmar, often collaborating with Cardinal Charles Maung Bo. Alongside other influential Buddhist leaders in Myanmar, he participated in a meeting with Pope Francis to discuss interfaith relations during his visit to the country in November 2017. He has worked with peace and interfaith groups in Mandalay and with the National League for Democracy.

In 2019, he was sued by the army for criticizing military donations of roughly 30 million kyats to the Buddhist nationalist organisation Ma Ba Tha, claiming that the military was sponsoring ultranationalist monks preaching hatred. He criticized the military, referring to them as "robbers and thieves", alleging that they disobeyed the president's orders, abused their power by intimidating civilians with their weapons, and unconstitutionally occupied parliamentary seats without an election. He also denounced Ashin Wirathu, a leading nationalist Buddhist monk, saying, "He sides a little towards hate [and this was] not the way Buddha taught. What the Buddha taught is that hatred is not good, because Buddha sees everyone as an equal being. The Buddha doesn't see people through religion".

In the aftermath of the 2021 Myanmar coup d'état, he was detained, along with state leaders and political activists, when junta troops raided his monastery within hours of seizing power. Following his arrest, he was disrobed and forced to wear civilian clothing. He was charged with "incitement against state stability" and sentenced to two years in Obo Prison.

Upon his release in August 2021, he left the country and sought shelter in Thailand. He spoke out against Sitagu Sayadaw, who has close ties to junta chief Min Aung Hlaing, for making discriminatory remarks against other religions and failing to condemn the military's killings of civilians. The Sayadaw says, "if you’re going to exploit the people in the name of religion, you’ve got to be one hell of a lousy politician".

== Death ==
The sayadaw died on 27 October 2022 in Mae Sot, Thailand, due to coronary heart disease at the age of 71.

The civilian-led National Unity Government (NUG) offered its condolences, stating that he had carried out exceptional religious duties and stood alongside the people in their struggle against military dictatorships since 1988, providing guidance and inspiration. The statement expressed that the entire nation was grieving his loss.

The Independent Catholics for Justice in Myanmar expressed their condolences upon his death, stating that it was a great loss for both the country and those who advocate for truth and dharma.

The Spring Revolution Muslim Network expressed its condolences and described the abbot's death as a "huge and irreplaceable loss, not only for the revolution but also for the country".

The Christian Solidarity Worldwide offered their condolences for the abbot's death, describing "the death was a devastating loss for those who advocate for interfaith dialogue and harmony, freedom of religion and belief, and human rights."
