= Soe Tun Shein =

Burmese businessperson

Soe Htun Shein (Burmese: စိုးထွန်းရှိန်) is a Burmese business tycoon. He is a former executive director of Asian Prosperity Export Import Co. Ltd. and chairman of the National Prosperity Gold Production Group, one of the country's largest gold mining companies. The company was granted permission to mine in Moehti Moemi, Yamethin Township, in 2011. He is also well known as a nationalist who has supported the extremist Buddhist nationalist group formerly known as Ma Ba Tha. In 2015 he donated just over 1.6 kilograms of gold, worth about $70,000, to Ma Ba Tha.

In November 2019, Soe Tun Shein was arrested in Thailand and extradited to Myanmar for allegedly failing to surrender his company's mining license and continuing to mine, leading to an arrest warrant being issued under Section 30 (a) of the criminal code. He and four other executives of the company were charged with failing to pay $80 million in taxes, according to the government.
