= U Wasawa =

Ashin U Wasawa
- ဦးဝါသဝ

Personal life
- Born: Muukwa village, Taze, Myanmar
- Other name: 550 Sayadaw
- Occupation: Buddhist monk

Religious life
- Religion: Buddhism
- School: Theravada
- Movement: Ma Ba Tha (Patriotic Association of Myanmar)
- Monastic name: Ashin Wasawa

U Wasawa (Burmese: ဦးဝါသဝ, also spelled U Warthawa), also known as 550 Sayadaw (Burmese: ၅၅၀ ဆရာတော်), is a Burmese ultranationalist monk and pro-military supporter who leads a Pyusawhti militia in Kanbalu.

== Biography ==
U Wasawa was born in Muukwa village, Taze, Myanmar. He is the abbot of the Tharthana Alinnyaung monastery in Hmaw Taw village and was a prominent former leader of the now defunct Ma Ba Tha, an extremist Buddhist organisation. Following the 2021 Myanmar coup d'état, U Wasawa established a Pyusawhti militia to launch offensives against the region's People's Defense Force. Several villages in Kantbalu have been turned into Pyusawhti bases, with U Warthawa reportedly forcing locals to join the militias. Initially armed with homemade weapons, around 900 Pyusawhti members in Kantbalu have since been supplied with modern BA-63 (G-3) rifles, MA-1 assault rifles, and carbines. His influence has spread to Kanbalu, Taze, and Kyunhla—key towns known for their military and Union Solidarity and Development Party support. He has since expanded his network throughout Sagaing, where there are now at least 77 pro-junta militia groups.

Following the fall of Lashio in August 2024, U Wasawa urged the military to bomb the northern part of Shan State, controlled by the Three Brotherhood Alliance, stating that it would be better if only the land remained. In a media interview, he called for the removal of villages that support the People's Defense Force (PDF) from the map of Myanmar. He ordered his forces to set fire to 10 villages in Khin-U, Sagaing Region, claiming that these villages were supporting the People's Defense Force (PDF).

In May 2024, U Warthawa was bestowed the title "Mingala Dhamma Jotikadhaja" by the Young Men's Buddhist Association (YMBA) in recognition of his dedicated service to the wellbeing of the patriarch and religious affairs.
