= Kanbalu (disambiguation) =

Kanbalu may refer to:

- Kanbalu, a town in Burma
- Khanbaliq, an old term for Beijing, written by Marco Polo in his Travels as Cambalu, translated by William Marsden as Kanbalu
