= Malaysia–Sri Lanka relations =

- Malaysia: Sri Lanka

Malaysia–Sri Lanka relations refers to the bilateral foreign relations between Malaysia and Sri Lanka. Malaysia has a high commission in Colombo, and Sri Lanka has a high commission in Kuala Lumpur. Both countries are members of the Commonwealth of Nations and the Group of 77.

== History ==
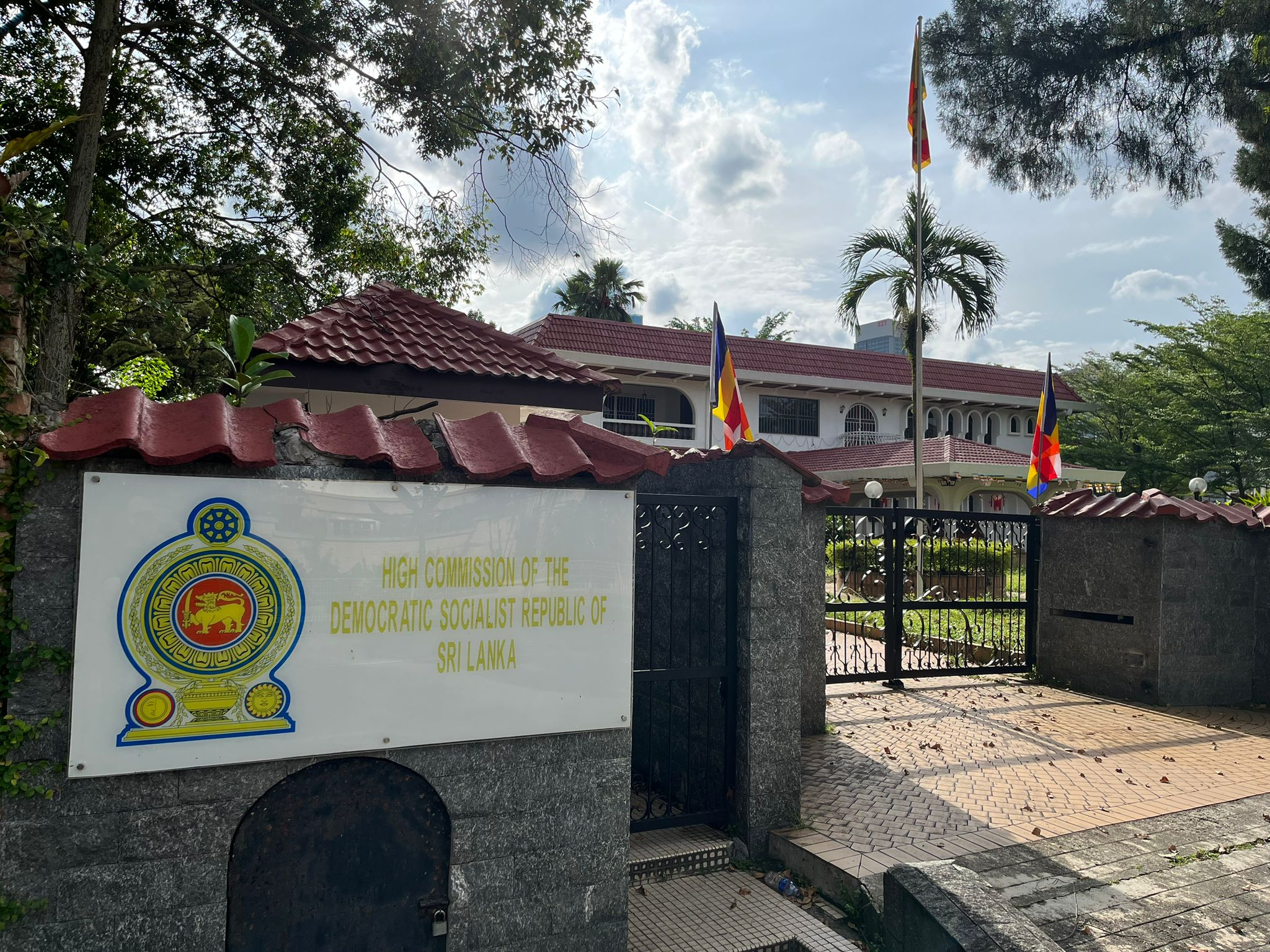
High Commission of the Democratic Socialist Republic of Sri Lanka in Kuala Lumpur, Malaysia

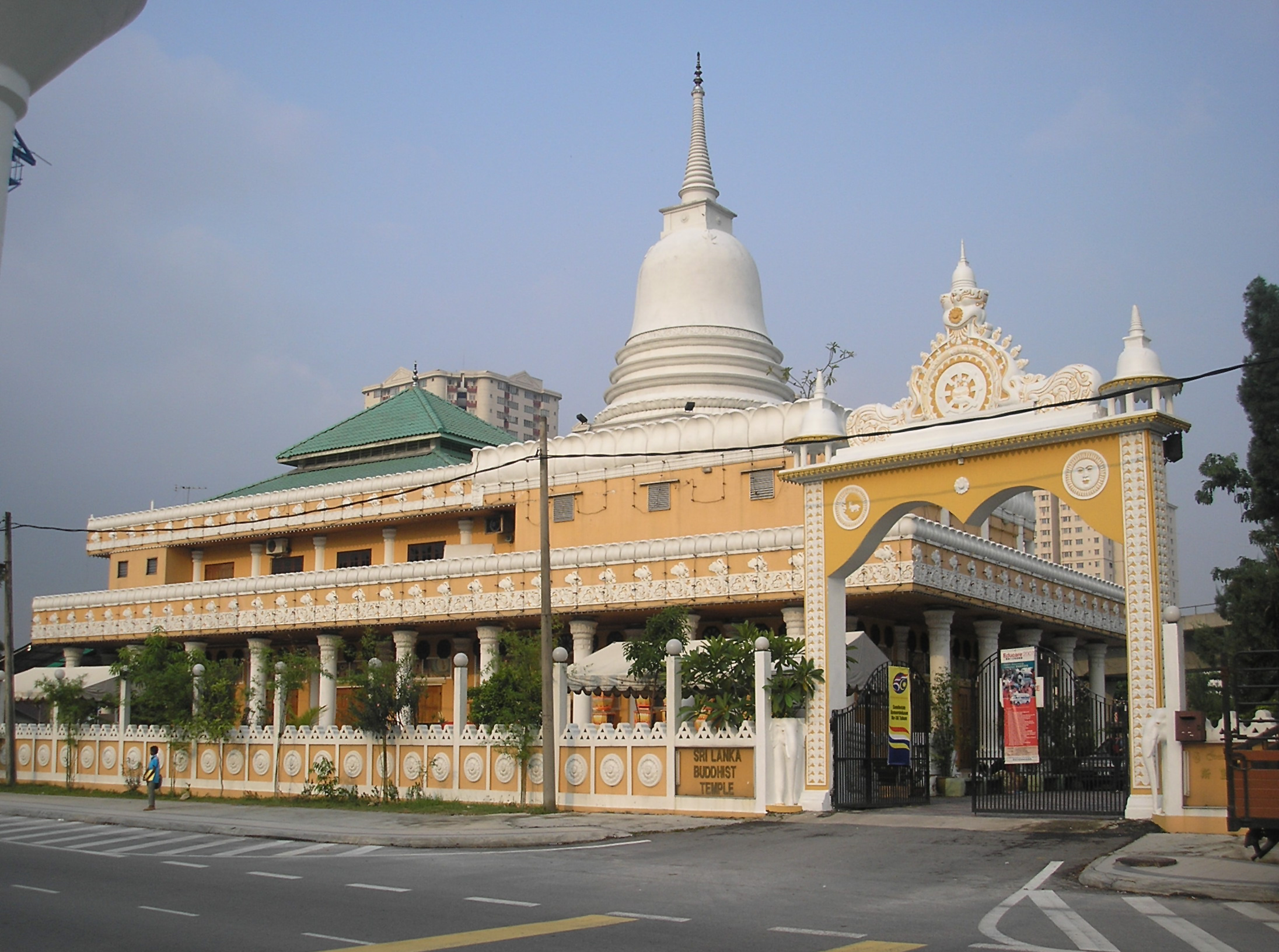
Sri Lanka Buddhist Temple (from Lorong Timur), Sentul, Kuala Lumpur

Trade relations between Sri Lanka and the Malay Peninsula date back to the first millennium. There was also warfare and conquest during the Chola dynasty. In the mid-13th century, the Malayan ruler Chandrabhanu Sridhamaraja of Tambralinga invaded Sri Lanka.

In modern times, current diplomatic relations have been established since 1957. Historically Malaysia has been a staunch supporter of Sri Lanka's inclusion into ASEAN, with then Prime Minister Tunku Abdul Rahman inviting delegates to Bangkok to sign the Bangkok Declaration as founding members of ASEAN. Though this was blocked by Singapore. President Chandrika Kumaratunga made a state visit in 1997, and several memoranda of understanding (MoUs) were signed during the meeting.

In December 2016, President Maithripala Sirisena made a 3-day state visit to Malaysia to improve relations between the two countries. Several MoUs have been signed during the meeting with Prime Minister Najib Razak.

== Economic relations ==
Malaysia is one of the major trade partners of Sri Lanka, and among the leading investors in the country, trade relations are expected to reach U$1 billion in 2015. In 2011, trade between the two countries reached U$814 million, with exports from Malaysia amounting to U$644 million and imports accounting for U$169 million. A joint commission also focused on some issues for both sides, especially economic and commercial matters, technical and scientific cooperation and areas such as tourism, culture, sports, immigration, and human resources development. In 2018, Malaysia called for a free trade agreement (FTA) to be signed with Sri Lanka.

== See also ==
- Sri Lankans in Malaysia
