= Kanbalu =

Town in Shwebo District, Sagaing Division, Myanmar

Coordinates: 23°12′14″N 95°30′55″E

Kanbalu (also spelt Kantbalu) is a town in Shwebo District, Sagaing Division, in Myanmar. Located in the north-western part of the county, the town is the administrative seat for Kanbalu Township. Kanbalu is on the main Burmese north-south railroad between Sagaing and Myitkyina. As of 2014, it had a population of 25,022

== History ==
Its railyards were bombed by the Allies during World War II. During the Myanmar Civil War, it was attacked by resistance forces, who torched the local police station.

Following the 2021 Myanmar coup d'état, an ultranationalist monk U Wasawa established a Pyusawhti militia in Hmaw Taw village to launch offensives against the region's People's Defense Force. Several villages in Kantbalu have been turned into Pyusawhti bases, with U Warthawa reportedly forcing locals to join the militias. Initially armed with homemade weapons, around 900 Pyusawhti members in Kantbalu have since been supplied with modern BA-63 (G-3) rifles, MA-1 assault rifles, and carbines. His influence has spread to Kanbalu township, Taze, and Kyunhla—key towns known for their military and Union Solidarity and Development Party support.

== Economy ==
The military-run Myanmar Economic Corporation operates two factories, manufacturing sugar and menthol, in Kantbalu. The sugar factory is a joint venture with Thai-owned Sutech Engineering. Kanbalu is also home to the 30 megawatts (40,000 hp) Thaphanseik hydropower plant on the Mu River, a $20-million project financed by the China Import and Export Bank.
