= Indonesia–Sri Lanka relations =

- Indonesia: Sri Lanka

The Republic of Indonesia and the Democratic Socialist Republic of Sri Lanka established diplomatic relations on 6 August 1952. Indonesia and Sri Lanka are members of numerous organizations such as the World Trade Organization and Indian-Ocean Rim Association. They are also founding members of the Non-Aligned Movement. Indonesia has an embassy in Colombo, while Sri Lanka has an embassy in Jakarta.

Regarding the LTTE separatism in Sri Lanka, Indonesia has expressed their support on Sri Lankan territorial integrity and national unity. Indonesia also supports the national reconciliation process in Sri Lanka towards peace and stability.

== History ==
The relationship between the two nations began earlier in 5th century CE, marked by the coming of Hinduism and Buddhism influences from the Indian subcontinent and Sri Lanka to the Nusantara archipelago. The Hindu-Buddhist kingdoms of ancient Indonesia and Sri Lanka nurtured contacts in the 9th to 12th century CE, during the era of the Srivijaya Empire, and Sri Lanka was called Sailan or Sailun which European colonials spelled Ceylon. Some old Indonesian accounts also wrote Sarandib, which influenced by Arab and Persian travellers. During this time, Buddhism was the principal religion of both nations. According to the Sri Lankan Ambassador to Indonesia, an Indonesian king visited Sri Lanka and presented a baby elephant as a gift.

The interactions between them grew in the 17th and 18th centuries, as both nations fell under the control of the Dutch East India Company (VOC). Sri Lanka was part of the VOC during Dutch period in Ceylon from 1656 to 1796. In the 17th-century, Indonesia was under the control of the Dutch East India Company as well as housing the headquarters for the VOC. It later became a Dutch colony in the Dutch East Indies until World War II. During the 18th century, multiple of kings, princes, and warriors from Javanese Mataram, Madura and Sulawesi, who opposed were opposed to Dutch rule of the Indonesian archipelago were exiled to Sri Lanka. The descendants of Indonesian exiles have created the Indonesian—Malay community in Sri Lanka that can trace their ancestry to Java, Madura and Sulawesi. For example, a warrior who fought for Kandy Kingdom named Karaeng Sangunglo was a Makassar nobleman.

Indonesia and Sri Lanka officially established diplomatic relations on 2 August 1952. The relations grow further in 1955, when Indonesia and Sri Lanka, together with India, Pakistan and Burma initiated the Bandung Conference. Since 1962, the status of the Indonesian Consulate office in Colombo has been upgraded as an embassy. The office has also served as the Indonesian representative office for the Maldives as of 2 September 1975.

== Economy and trade ==
The Sri Lanka-Indonesia Business Council was established on August 30, 1991, with the main objective of promoting bilateral trade, investment, and tourism.

As of 2023, the bilateral trade volume was US$370 million, with negotiations on a preferential trade agreement commencing in 2024. Since 2012, both nations have agreed on increasing bilateral cooperation sectors including defense, culture, agriculture and aquaculture.

== Culture ==
In April 2013, Indonesia and Sri Lanka commemorated the 60th anniversary of diplomatic relations in Merdeka Building, Bandung, to commemorate the Asian–African Conference, the historic event that brought two nations closer together. This event is also marked with cultural collaboration of the traditional puppet performance; Indonesian wayang golek with Sri Lankan ruukada.

== Embassy ==
Embassy of the Republic of Indonesia in Colombo
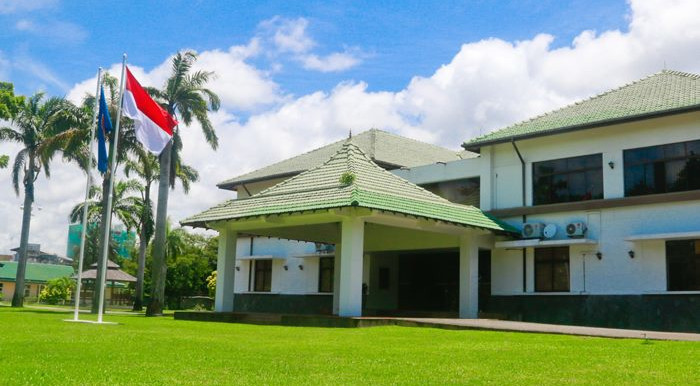
- Address: 400/50 Sarana Road; Colombo 7, Sri Lanka
- Coordinates: 6.901812°N 79.875325°E
- Ambassador: Dewi Gustina Tobing
- Jurisdiction: Sri Lanka; Maldives
- Website: kemlu.go.id/colombo/en

The Embassy of the Republic of Indonesia in Colombo (Indonesian: Kedutaan Besar Republik Indonesia di Kolombo) is the diplomatic mission of the Republic of Indonesia to the Democratic Socialist Republic of Sri Lanka and is concurrently accredited to the Republic of Maldives. The current ambassador, Dewi Gustina Tobing, was appointed by President Joko Widodo on 25 October 2021.
