= Buddhist nationalism =

Form of religious nationalism associated with Buddhism

Buddhist nationalism is a form of religious nationalism in which Buddhism and national identity are closely linked. It combines elements of Buddhist religious doctrine, culture, and symbols with political and ethnic nationalism. In this ideology, the protection and promotion of Buddhism are viewed as essential to the survival and unity of the nation.

== Overview ==
Buddhist nationalism has developed primarily in countries where Theravāda Buddhism is the dominant religion, such as Sri Lanka, Myanmar, Thailand, Cambodia, and Laos. It emphasizes the historical and cultural connection between Buddhism and the state, portraying the religion as an integral part of national heritage and moral identity.

The ideology often emerges in response to perceived threats — whether from colonialism, Christian missionary activity, Islam, or modern secularism. Proponents typically argue that safeguarding Buddhism is equivalent to protecting the nation itself.

== History ==
The roots of Buddhist nationalism can be traced to the late colonial and early post-colonial periods in Asia. During colonial rule, Buddhist institutions were often displaced or weakened by Western influence and Christian missions. In reaction, Buddhist reform movements arose that merged religious revivalism with political independence movements.

In countries such as Sri Lanka and Myanmar, monks and lay reformers played major roles in promoting both Buddhist learning and nationalist causes. The result was a form of anti-colonial identity that saw the defense of Buddhism as inseparable from the defense of the homeland.

== By country ==
=== Sri Lanka ===
In Sri Lanka, Buddhist nationalism is closely associated with the Sinhalese people. The chronicle Mahavamsa and related texts portray the island as a land destined to preserve the Buddha’s teachings. Since the late 19th century, Sinhalese Buddhist activists have argued that the state has a duty to protect Buddhism. Political parties such as the Jathika Hela Urumaya and organizations like Bodu Bala Sena have advocated policies reflecting this ideology. Critics claim that such movements have contributed to ethnic tension between the Sinhalese majority and Tamil, Muslim, and Christian minorities.

=== Myanmar ===
In Myanmar (Burma), Buddhist nationalism has been expressed through organizations such as the 969 Movement and the Patriotic Association of Myanmar (Ma Ba Tha). These groups frame the protection of Buddhism as a national duty and have campaigned for laws restricting interfaith marriage and religious conversion. Buddhist nationalist rhetoric has been cited as contributing to discrimination and violence against the Rohingya people and other Muslim minorities.

=== Thailand ===
Buddhism in Thailand is closely tied to the monarchy and Thai identity. Although Thai nationalism traditionally emphasizes unity rather than exclusion, Buddhist symbols and teachings remain central to the Thai state. Some Thai monks and politicians have periodically called for stronger constitutional recognition of Buddhism as the national religion.

=== Cambodia and Laos ===
In Cambodia and Laos, Buddhist nationalism is often linked to cultural preservation and the legacy of colonial rule. The religion serves as a symbol of national unity and resistance against foreign domination. However, overt political Buddhist nationalism has been less pronounced compared to Sri Lanka or Myanmar.

== Criticism ==
Buddhist nationalism has been criticized for promoting religious intolerance and undermining pluralism. Human rights organizations have accused some movements of encouraging hate speech and violence against minority groups. Scholars argue that such ideologies distort core Buddhist teachings of compassion, non-violence, and detachment by turning them into tools of exclusion or aggression.

== See also ==
- Religious nationalism
- Sinhalese Buddhist nationalism
- 969 Movement
- Patriotic Association of Myanmar
- Ethnic conflict in Sri Lanka
