= 969 Movement =

Nationalist movement in Myanmar (Burma)

- ၉၆၉ လှုပ်ရှားမှု
- Founder: Wirathu
- Country: Myanmar
- Allegiance: Patriotic Association of Myanmar
- Ideology: Islamophobia; Buddhist nationalism

The 969 Movement (Burmese: ၉၆၉ လှုပ်ရှားမှု) is a Buddhist nationalist organisation opposed to the perceived expansion of Islam in predominantly Buddhist Myanmar. The three digits of 969 "symbolise the virtues of the Buddha, Buddhist practices and the Buddhist community". The first 9 represents the nine special attributes of the Buddha in Buddhism, the 6 represents the six special attributes of his teachings (the Dharma), and the second 9 represents the nine special attributes of the Sangha (the Buddhist monastic community). Those special attributes are the Three Jewels of the Buddha. In the past, the Buddha, Sangha, Dharma, the wheel of Dharma, and "969" were Buddhist signs.

The movement has had strong reactions within and beyond Myanmar. It has received criticism in international media. In April 2013, The Straits Times reported that critics remained sceptical after Wirathu, the movement's leader, responded to recent anti-Muslim violence with pledges to work for peace.

Various media organizations have described the movement as being anti-Muslim or "Islamophobic". The movement's Myanmar Buddhist supporters deny it is anti-Muslim, with Wirathu stating it is a protective movement about targeting "Bengalis who are terrorizing ethnic Rakhine (Buddhists)". Alex Bookbinder, in The Atlantic, links the movement's origins in a book written in the late 1990s by Kyaw Lwin, a functionary in the Ministry of Religious Affairs, and its precepts are rooted in a traditional belief in numerology. Across South Asia, Muslims represent the phrase "In the Name of God, the Compassionate and Merciful" with the number 786, and businesses display the number to indicate that they are Muslim-owned. 969 proponents see this as a Muslim plot to conquer Burma in the 21st century, based on the premise that 7 plus 8 plus 6 is equal to 21. The number 969 is intended to be 786's cosmological opposite.

== Wirathu ==
Wirathu is regarded as the movement's highest protector. It has been reported that he advocates the boycott of shops owned by Muslims. Wirathu has himself stated that the movement has been treated as a scapegoat by being unfairly blamed for events like the 2012 Rakhine State riots, and maintains that "969 is not violent". The Asia Times Online has described him as a "complex figure" who demonises Muslims, but also protests police violence. An article in The Straits Times says a source indicated that Wirathu had changed his tone and "pledged to promote peace among religious communities".

The cover story of the 20 June 2013 issue of Time magazine called Wirathu "The Face of Buddhist Terror". "You can be full of kindness and love, but you cannot sleep next to a mad dog", Wirathu said, referring to Muslims. "If we are weak", he said, "our land will become Muslim". "Some people misunderstood the title [of the Time article] ... seeing it as an insult to religion", said Dr. Yan Myo Thein, a political analyst. "They believe it’s equating Buddhism with terrorism". After the publication of the Time article, Wirathu denied responsibility for anti-Muslim violence. Shortly after, the June 2013 issue of Time featuring Wirathu was banned in Myanmar.

Burma's government has objected to the magazine article. Authorities deny they are defending the monk, Wirathu, but said they were concerned the article could create problems after recent unrest between Buddhists and Muslims. Burmese President Thein Sein, however, has defended Wirathu, saying the monk's order was striving for peace and prosperity and that the report undermined efforts to rebuild trust between faiths. "The government is currently striving with religious leaders, political parties, media and the people to rid Myanmar [Burma] of unwanted conflicts," he added. Wirathu has said that the Time article was not against Buddhism, just against him. In an interview with The Irrawaddy magazine, he also alleged Muslim extremists were behind the article and planning to wage jihad against Burma.

Hundreds of protesters took to the streets of Yangon early in the afternoon on 30 June 2013 in a peaceful demonstration against Time magazine's article on Wirathu and the 969 movement. Marching monks held a banner proclaiming that Wirathu is "not a terrorist, but a protector of race, language and religion". Speaking to Mizzima News, one demonstrator, a 51-year-old office manager, said, "Time magazine is wrong. He [Wirathu] is peaceful. Every monk is a peacemaker. The Buddhist religion wants brotherhood with everyone."

In September 2014, Wirathu attended a "Great Sangha Conference" in Colombo organised by Bodu Bala Sena. Wirathu said that his 969 Movement would work with the Bodu Bala Sena.

== Initiatives ==
The movement is seeking to draft a law that would forbid Buddhist women from marrying non-Buddhist men without the permission of local officials. Dhammapiya, a senior monk who helped write the original proposal for the law, said it was meant to encourage peace between different faiths and to "protect" Buddhist women from being forced to convert to Islam when they marry Muslim men. Government religious regulatory authorities, while supporting the protection of the Buddhist faith from perceived Islamic threats, reject the legal initiatives of the 969 movement and have "prohibited the creation of formal organisations" based on 969 principles.

== See also ==
- Bodu Bala Sena
- 2012 Ramu violence
- Buddhism and violence
- South Thailand insurgency
- Rohingya conflict
- 2012 Rakhine State riots
- 2013 Burma anti-Muslim riots
- Persecution of Muslims in Burma
- Patriotic Association of Myanmar
- Chittagong Hill Tracts conflict
  - Persecution of Buddhists#Bangladesh
- Cambodian genocide, Cambodia
- Chakma people
- Jumma people
