= Religious nationalism =

Relationship between national identity and religion

Religious nationalism can be understood in a number of ways, such as nationalism as a religion itself, a position articulated by Carlton Hayes in his text Nationalism: A Religion, or as the relationship of nationalism to a particular religious belief, dogma, ideology, or affiliation. This relationship can be broken down into two aspects: the politicisation of religion and the influence of religion on politics.

In the former aspect, a shared religion can be seen to contribute to a sense of national unity, a common bond among the citizens of the nation. Another political aspect of religion is the support of a national identity, similar to a shared ethnicity, language, or culture. The influence of religion on politics is more ideological, where current interpretations of religious ideas inspire political activism and action; for example, laws are passed to foster stricter religious adherence.

Ideologically-driven religious nationalism may not necessarily be targeted against other religions per se, but can be articulated in response to modernity and, in particular, secular nationalism. Indeed, religious nationalism may articulate itself as the binary of secular nationalism. Nation-states whose borders are relatively recent or that have experienced colonialism may be more prone to religious nationalism, which may stand as a more authentic or "traditional" rendering of identity. Thus, there was a global rise of religious nationalism in the wake of the end of the Cold War, but also as postcolonial politics (facing considerable developmental challenges, but also dealing with the reality of colonially defined, and therefore somewhat artificial, borders) became challenged. In such a scenario, appealing to a national sense of Islamic identity, as in the case of Pakistan (see two-nation theory), may serve to override regional tensions.

The danger is that when the state derives political legitimacy from adherence to religious doctrines, this may leave an opening to overtly religious elements, institutions, and leaders, making the appeals to religion more 'authentic' by bringing more explicitly theological interpretations to political life. Thus, appeals to religion as a marker of ethnicity create an opening for more strident and ideological interpretations of religious nationalism. Many ethnic and cultural nationalisms include religious aspects, but as a marker of group identity, rather than the intrinsic motivation for nationalist claims.

== Buddhist nationalism ==
Buddhist nationalism is mainly prevalent and influential in Sri Lanka and Myanmar, and is also present in Cambodia and Thailand.

Sinhalese Buddhist nationalism is a political ideology that combines a focus on Sinhalese culture and ethnicity with an emphasis on Theravada Buddhism, which is the majority belief system of the Sinhalese in Sri Lanka.

The Patriotic Association of Myanmar and 969 movement have the goal to "organise and protect" the Burman people and their Buddhist religion, which is influenced by Buddhist nationalism in Myanmar.

== Christian nationalism ==
Christian nationalists focus more on internal politics, such as passing laws that reflect their view of Christianity. In countries with a state Church, Christian nationalists, in seeking to preserve the status of a Christian state, uphold an antidisestablishmentarian position. They actively promote religious (Christian) discourses in various fields of social life, from politics and history to culture and science; with respect to legislation for example, Christian nationalists advocate Sunday blue laws. Distinctive radicalized forms of religious nationalism or clerical nationalism (clero-nationalism or clerico-nationalism) were emerging on the far-right of the political spectrum in various European countries especially during the interwar period in the first half of the 20th century.

- In the Middle Ages, efforts were made to establish a Pan-Christian state by uniting the countries within Christendom to succeed the Roman Empire. Christian nationalism played a role in this era in which Christians felt the impulse to recover lands in which Christianity flourished. After the rise of Islam, certain parts of North Africa, East Asia, Southern Europe, Central Asia, and the Middle East lost Christian control.
- In Poland, nationalism was always characterized by loyalty to the Catholic Church. Groups like the National Revival of Poland use slogans like Wielka Polska Katolicka (Great Catholic Poland) and protest vigorously against legalization of gay marriage and abortion. Conservative religious groups connected with Radio Maryja are often accused of harboring nationalist and antisemitic attitudes.
- Religious nationalism which is characterized by communal adherence to Eastern Orthodoxy and national Orthodox Churches is found in many states of Eastern Europe as well as in the Russian Federation and Serbia.

== Hindu nationalism ==
Given the extensive linguistic, religious, and ethnic diversity of the Indian population, nationalism in India in general does not fall within the purview of a solitary variant of nationalism. Indians may identify with their nation on account of civic, cultural, or third-world nationalism. Commentators have noted that in modern India, a contemporary form of Hindu nationalism, or Hindutva, has been endorsed by the Bharatiya Janata Party and Rashtriya Swayamsevak Sangh.

Hindutva (meaning "Hinduness"), a term popularised by Hindu nationalist Vinayak Damodar Savarkar in 1923, is the predominant form of Hindu nationalism in India. Hindutva is championed by right-wing Hindu nationalist volunteer organisation Rashtriya Swayamsevak Sangh (RSS), widely regarded as the ruling Bharatiya Janata Party's parent organisation, along with its affiliate organisations, notably the Vishva Hindu Parishad.

== Islamic nationalism ==
=== Pakistan ===
Unlike the secular form of nationalism which is espoused in most other countries, Pakistani nationalism is religious in nature, consisting of Islamic nationalism. Religion was the basis of the Pakistani nationalist narrative. (see Secularism in Pakistan) Pakistani nationalism is closely associated with Muslim heritage, the religion of Islam, and it is also associated with Pan-Islamism, as it is described in the Two-nation theory. It also refers to the consciousness and the expression of religious and ethnic influences that help mould the national consciousness. Pakistan has been called a "global center for political Islam".

=== Others ===
Hamas is a party which mixes Palestinian nationalism with Islamism.

Ahrar al-Sham, Jaysh al-Islam and Other Rebel Groups mix Syrian nationalism with Islamism

Jaish ul-Adl mixes Baloch nationalism with Islamism.

The Taliban's ideology combines Islamism with Pashtunwali and Afghan nationalism

Somali Islamist movement Al-Shabaab incorporates Somali religious nationalism and anti-imperialism into its Salafi Jihadist ideology.

== Jewish nationalism ==
Some scholars have argued that Jewish religious nationalism has roots that predate the modern era. Anthony D. Smith, a historical sociologist and the founder of the ethnosymbolist school in nationalism studies, wrote that the case of the Jews in the late Second Temple period "must make us wary of pronouncing too readily against the possibility of the nation, and even a form of religious nationalism, before the onset of modernity."

Religious Zionism is an ideology that combines Zionism and Orthodox Judaism. Before the establishment of the State of Israel, most Religious Zionists were observant Jews who supported Zionist efforts to rebuild a Jewish state in the Land of Israel. After the Six-Day War, and the capture of the West Bank, right-wing supporters of the Religious Zionist movement integrated themselves into Israeli nationalism and they eventually founded a new movement which evolved into Neo-Zionism, the ideology of Neo-Zionism revolves around three pillars: the Land of Israel, the People of Israel, and the Torah of Israel.

== Nationalism in modern paganism ==
Paganism resurfaces as a topic of fascination in 18th to 19th-century Romanticism, in particular in the context of the literary Viking revivals, which portrayed historical Celtic, Slavic and Germanic polytheists as noble savages.

Romanticist interest in non-classical antiquity coincided with the rise of Romantic nationalism and the rise of the nation state in the context of the 1848 revolutions, leading to the creation of national epics and national myths for the various newly formed states. Pagan or folkloric topics were also common in the musical nationalism of the period.

Organisations such as the Armanen-Orden represent significant developments in neo-pagan esotericism and Ariosophy after World War II, but they do not all constitute forms of Nazi esotericism. Some northern European neopagan groups, such as Theods, Ásatrúarfélagið, and Viðartrúar, have explicitly stated that neo-Nazism is not common among their members. Despite this, pagan symbols are commonly appropriated by ultra-nationalists, as seen with the Unite the Right rally in 2017.

== Shinto ==
The "State Shinto" term was used to categorize, and promote, Imperial Japanese practices that relied on Shinto to support Japan's nationalistic ideology. By refusing to ban Shinto practices outright, Japan's post-war constitution was thus able to preserve full freedom of religion.

== Sikh ==
The Khalistan movement is a Sikh separatist movement seeking to create a homeland for Sikhs by establishing a sovereign state, called Khālistān ('Land of the Khalsa'), in the Punjab region. The proposed state would consist of land that currently forms Punjab, India.

== Other religious movements and nationalism ==
In the Korean peninsula, the Donghak movement and its leader, Choe Je-u, were inspired by Korean Catholic missionaries. However, they condemned the 'Western learning' preached by missionaries and contrasted it with the indigenous 'Eastern learning'. They started a rebellion in 1894 in Jeolla province in southwestern Korea. The Donghak movement served as a template for the later Daejonggyo and Jeungsan-gyo movements, as well as for other religious nationalist movements. The Buddhist-influenced Daejonggyo movement financed guerillas in Manchuria during Japanese colonial rule of both Korea and Manchuria. The North Korean state ideology, Juche, is sometimes classified as a religion in the United States Department of State's human rights reports.

== See also ==
- Christian Identity
- Christianity and politics
- Clerical fascism
- Fundamentalism
- Judaism and politics
- National Catholicism
- Philippine Independent Church
- Political aspects of Islam
- Political religion
- Religion in politics
- Sectarianism
- State religion
- Theocracy

== Sources ==
- Feldman, Matthew; Turda, Marius; Georgescu, Tudor, eds. (2008). Clerical Fascism in Interwar Europe. Routledge. ISBN 9781317968993.
