= Wirathu =

Burmese Buddhist monk (born 1968)

Personal life
- Born: Maung; 10 July 1968 (age 58) Kyaukse, Mandalay Division, Burma (now Myanmar)
- Occupation: Buddhist monk

Religious life
- Religion: Buddhism
- Temple: New Masoyein Monastery, Mandalay
- School: Theravada
- Monastic name: Vīrasū

Senior posting
- Teacher: Dhammapiya

Wirathu (Note: Burmese: ဝီရသူ, Pali: Vīrasū) (born Win Khaing Oo; (Note: Burmese: ဝင်းခိုင်ဦး) 10 July 1968) is a Burmese Buddhist monk and militant who is the leader of the 969 Movement in Myanmar.

Dubbed the "face of Buddhist terror", he has incited the persecution of Muslims in Myanmar, especially the Rohingya minority, through his speeches. Facebook banned his page on the charge of allegedly spreading religious hatred towards other communities, after repeated warnings to not post religiously inflammatory content.

== Background ==
Wirathu was born as Win Khaing Oo in 1968 in Myinsaing village, Kyaukse, near Mandalay. He left school at the age of 14 to become a monk, becoming a Samanera in 1985 and a Bhikkhu in 1988.

In 2001, he became involved in the 969 Movement. Two years later, in 2003, he was sentenced to 25 years in prison for his sermons, but was released in 2012 along with many other political prisoners. Since the government reforms of 2011, he has been especially active on YouTube and other forms of social media. After repeated warnings not to post religiously inflammatory content, Facebook banned his page for spreading religious hatred towards other communities.

== 969 Movement ==
In September 2012, Wirathu led a rally of monks in Mandalay, promoting President Thein Sein's controversial plan to send Burmese Rohingya Muslims to a third country. One month later, more violence broke out in Rakhine State. Wirathu has claimed that the violence in the state originated subsequent violence in Meiktila, where a dispute in a gold shop quickly spiralled into a looting-and-arson spree. More than 14 people were killed, after monasteries, shops and houses were burned down across the city. At least two people, including a Burmese Buddhist monk, Shin Thawbita, and a Muslim man were reportedly assaulted and tortured by mobs in Meiktila on 5 March.

Wirathu is mentioned on the cover story of Time magazine as "The Face of Buddhist Terror" on 1 July 2013. "You can be full of kindness and love, but you cannot sleep next to a mad dog," Wirathu said, referring to Muslims. "If we are weak," he said, "our land will become Muslim." Referring to Muslim violence and domination in neighbouring nations and the example of the spread of Islam in Indonesia, Wirathu claims that his Muslim opponents labelled him the "Burmese Bin Laden" after the Time article incorrectly reported he described himself in this manner. He said he "abhorred violence" and "opposes terrorism". Wirathu has expressed admiration for, and a desire to follow the example of, the English Defence League by "protecting the public."

Thein Sein accused Time of slandering the Buddhist religion and harming the national reconciliation process by accusing the outspoken cleric of stoking anti-Muslim violence in Myanmar. Describing him as a "son of Buddha", the president defended Wirathu as a "noble person" committed to peace. "The article in Time Magazine can cause misunderstanding about the Buddhist religion, which has existed for millennia and is followed by the majority of Burmese citizens," Thein Sein said. In an interview with DVB, Wirathu accused Time of committing a "serious human rights violation" by refusing to present his views in a verbatim question and answer format. "Before I had heard [rumours] of the Arab world dominating the global media," he said, "but this time, I've seen it for myself." Wirathu openly blamed Muslims for instigating the recent violence. Wirathu claimed that Myanmar's Muslims are being financed by Middle Eastern forces, saying, "The local Muslims are crude and savage because the extremists are pulling the strings, providing them with financial, military and technical power".

On 21 July 2013, he was the apparent target of a bomb explosion, but he remained unscathed. Five people were slightly injured in the blast, including a novice monk. Wirathu claimed that the bombing was an attempt by Muslim extremists to silence his voice.

He has called for restrictions on marriages between Buddhists and Muslims, and for boycotts of Muslim-owned businesses.

However, not everyone from within his own faith agrees with his teachings. Abbot Ashin Ariyawuntha Biwunsa of Mandalay's Myawaddy Sayadaw monastery denounced him, saying, "He sides a little towards hate [and this was] not the way Buddha taught. What the Buddha taught is that hatred is not good, because Buddha sees everyone as an equal being. The Buddha doesn't see people through religion." The Guardian explained what they see as his extremism as little more than due to ignorance, although his views do have influence in Myanmar where many businesses are "run successfully by Muslims".

Burmese pro-democracy activist Maung Zarni denounced Wirathu's 969 Movement for spreading hate speech and argued that EU countries should take the matter seriously as Myanmar is a "major EU-aid recipient country".

== Activities after the ban of the 969 movement ==
The 969 movement was banned by the State Sangha Maha Nayaka Committee in September 2013, for having drafted civil rights laws to limit the Muslim population. But shortly after, in January 2014, people formerly involved in the 969 movement established the Patriotic Association of Myanmar, known by its Burmese initials Ma Ba Tha, that carried on promoting the ideas of protection of race. This association again renamed to the Buddha Dhamma Charity Foundation in 2017 after a similar ban. Wirathu reacted to these bans by pointing that the Sangha Maha Nayaka Committee was controlled by the military and took its decision "under the gun".

Although Ma Ba Tha is led by a collegial committee, Wirathu is described as the outspoken leader of the Ma Ba Tha. As such, he participated in Ma Ba Tha's campaign in favor of laws limiting the civil rights of Muslims, and preventing them to have multiple wives, to marry Buddhist women or to have large families.

In January 2015, Wirathu publicly called United Nations envoy Yanghee Lee a "bitch" and a "whore" after she publicly reacted to the legislative lobbying campaign, and invited her to "offer your arse to the kalars" (a derogatory term for Muslims).

Wirathu led a prayer and protest at the Mahamuni Buddha Temple in Mandalay on 23 February 2017 to condemn the Thai government's raid on the Wat Phra Dhammakaya in Bangkok.

Ayeyarwady Region's religious council, the region's Sangha Maha Nayaka, banned Wirathu from preaching in the region on 10 March 2017.

== Arrest and release ==
After the ban ended, he continued his religious alertness speeches. He hinted at overthrowing Aung San Suu Kyi by trying to drive a wedge between her and the military according to the Myanmar Times, "People should worship military MPs as if they are worshipping Buddha...", and further likened Suu Kyi to "a prostitute sucking up to foreign interests" at a speech in Myeik that went viral. An arrest warrant was issued for that speech in May 2019 on grounds of sedition and slander. After a year and a half of evading arrest, he surrendered to the police in Yangon a week before the 2020 Myanmar general election, and got arrested.

In September 2021, the sedition charges against Wirathu were dismissed by the military junta, and he was subsequently released. In November 2022, he was awarded the title of Thiri Pyanchi, one of the country’s highest honors.
