= Pyusawhti militias =

Militia groups in Myanmar

Pyusawhti Militias
- ပျူစောထီးပြည်သူ့စစ်အဖွဲ့များ
- Arm patch of Pyusawhti militias
- Dates active: 1955–1962; 2000s–present
- Ideology: Buddhist nationalism Militarism; Ultranationalism
- Political position: Right-wing to far-right
- Wars: the Internal conflict in Myanmar

Pyusawhti militias (Burmese: ပျူစောထီးပြည်သူ့စစ်အဖွဲ့များ Burmese pronunciation: [pjù.sɔ́.tʰí pjì.θu̼ sɪʔ.tæʔ.mjá], also spelt Pyu Saw Htee) refers to three distinct groups of pro-military militias in Myanmar.

The term was first used in 1955, when U Nu's government created Pyusawhti paramilitary units to assist the military with counterinsurgency operations. After a coup in 1958, the army tried to disband them as they had become loyal to local ruling-party politicians. However, their attempt was not completely successful.

In the 2000s, Burmese media began using the term to refer to poorly trained irregulars mobilized by the military.

In 2021, new village-based, loosely organised militia groups collectively known as the Pyusawhti emerged. These militias, officially called People's militias, were formed by supporters of the military of Myanmar and those suspected to be its supporters, who feared attacks by the resistance forces, most of which later turned into the People's Defence Forces. They conduct attacks on the resistance forces and their perceived supporters. They are given some assistance by the military of Myanmar, which in turn utilises them to compensate for its lack of local knowledge and intelligence, as well as its shortage of manpower. Observers have noted ties with extremist nationalist organisations like the Patriotic Association of Myanmar.

== History ==
The name comes from Pyusawhti, a legendary king in Burmese history. In 1955, the Burmese government under U Nu devised a local village and town defence scheme, which used paramilitary units called 'Pyusawhti' to assist the Burmese military in counterinsurgency operations. The army attempted to disband and disarm them after the 1958 coup with mixed success. The Pyusawhti quickly became the personal militaries of local leaders appointed by the Anti-Fascist People's Freedom League, the dominant political party at the time. They would rampage rural areas to force votes during the 1956 and 1960 elections. After the 1962 Burmese coup d'état, Ne Win would replace them with his own Kakweye (Burmese: ကာကွယ်ရေး; Protection) militia units, making the Pyusawhti obsolete.

The term 'Pyusawhti' re-emerged in the 2000s, used by Burmese media in reference to pro-military networks of irregulars mobilized by the military of Burma. Burmese security forces had previously deployed similar networks, including swan ar shin (စွမ်းအားရှင်, lit. 'masters of force'), during the crackdown on the Saffron Revolution in 2007. Similar tactics were used against demonstrators in the Myanmar protests (2021–present), but the irregulars faced strong resistance and were often fought off.

During the 2021 Myanmar civil war, newly formed militias called the Pyusawhti often fought with Tatmadaw troops and helped to occupy contested areas. In the wake of the 2021 Myanmar coup d'état and ensuing Myanmar civil war (2021–present), the Pyusawhti emerged out of existing local networks of Buddhist nationalists, members of the military's proxy party, Union Solidarity and Development Party, and army veterans formed in the lead-up to the 2020 Myanmar general election to defeat the National League for Democracy. They formed these militias in response to attacks on pro-regime figures and suspected supporters of the military. Police forces armed them with seized hunting guns, muzzeloaders, and other older weapons. The military initially did not give them more effective weaponry, as they feared that arms they give might end up in the hands of the resistance forces. But by January 2024, it began transferring assault rifles to them and allowed them more autonomy. Burmese security forces have leveraged Pyusawhti militias for reinforcements, military intelligence, and knowledge of local terrain, especially in the Dry Zone theater.

Observers have noted ties with extremist nationalist groups like the Patriotic Association of Myanmar.

On 16 August 2024, the State Administration Council junta's Ministry of Border Affairs formed committees to oversee “people’s security and anti-terrorism [militias].” In March of 2025, these "anti-terrorism groups" in the Mandalay Region were being supplied arms such as the G3 rifle. These forces consist mostly of men too old for regular military service, and are dressed in blue uniforms.

Since 2021, the Warazup People's Militia (along with ethnic Lisu militias) supported Tatmadaw operations against the Kachin Independence Army. Warazup claims that they were formed as a self-defence group. Many Kachin locals accuse the Warazup militias of extortion and looting. Documents acquired by The Irrawaddy from a whistleblower in the Department of Civil Aviation revealed that the Warazup PMF received weapons from the Tatmadaw via Myanmar National Airlines aircraft.

== Effect on local communities ==
=== Increase in communal violence ===
Pyusawhti militias target resistance members and participate in atrocities committed by regime forces. Such actions lead to retaliations by the resistance. Consequently, both sides engage in reprisals against suspected supporters of the opposite side.

Some villages with Pyusawhti militias face social isolation, and the People’s Defense Forces restrict their access to necessities like food and fuel.

=== Forcible recruitment ===
Pyusawhti militias are accused of forcible recruitment. Locals claimed that they and soldiers of the military of Myanmar threatened to cut off food and water supply or seize houses if they didn't agree to join them.

== Myingyan Pyusawhti militia force ==
Pyusawhti miltia in Natogyi Township, Myingyan District during 2025.

One of the strongest Pyusawhti militias is based in Myingyan Township, an area regarded as strategically important in the ongoing conflict. The Myingyan militias is led by Thida Yu Mon. Resistance forces have described the township as central to control of the wider region, stating that gaining control of Myingyan would effectively determine control over Central Myanmar. The area has therefore been the focus of major offensives, including the "Myingyan District Special Operation" launched by the National Unity Government's Ministry of Defence. Owing to the district's strategic importance, junta authorities have supplied the militia with weapons and ammunition. During clashes in the area, junta forces have also provided air support to operations involving Myingyan-based militias. The group operates primarily in Myingyan, Taungtha, and Ngazun townships.

The Myingyan Pyusawhti militias have been accused of human rights violations against civilians. Local sources and human rights observers have alleged that the militia was involved in arrests, raids, and violence against civilians in villages around Myingyan. According to residents cited in media reports, approximately 20 victims were individually identified among those confirmed killed.

A source cited by Mizzima reported that a man was killed during a joint operation by junta forces and a Pyusawhti group in a village in Myingyan. According to the report, the victim was burned and beheaded, and his body parts were left in separate locations. The killing was attributed to a Pyusawhti unit led by Thida Yu Mon. The same report stated that at least 26 people were killed in the incident, including civilians, pregnant women, and children. Homes in no fewer than 10 villages were reportedly burned, and civilian houses were looted and subjected to extortion.
