= Patriotic Association of Myanmar =

Ultra-nationalist Buddhist organisation

- အမျိုးသား ဘာသာ သာသနာ စောင့်ရှောက်ရေးအဖွဲ့ သာသနဝံသပါလ
- Abbreviation: PAM (Ma Ba Tha)
- Successor: Dhamma Vaṃsānurakkhita Association of Myanmar
- Formation: 15 January 2014
- Dissolved: July 2017; 9 years ago
- Purpose: Theravada Buddhism, Buddhist nationalism Factions: Ultranationalism; Anti-Islam; Far-right politics
- Headquarters: Insein Township, Yangon Region, Myanmar
- Chairman: Ywama Sayadaw Ashin Tilokabhivamsa
- Vice Chairman: Ashin Wirathu
- Affiliations: 969 Movement

The Patriotic Association of Myanmar (Burmese: အမျိုးသား ဘာသာ သာသနာ စောင့်ရှောက်ရေး အဖွဲ့), abbreviated Ma Ba Tha (မဘသ) in Burmese and variously translated into English as Association for the Protection of Race and Religion, Organisation for the Protection of Race and Religion and Committee for the Protection of Nationality and Religion is an ultra-nationalist Buddhist organisation based in Myanmar (Burma). Some PAM members are connected to the Buddhist nationalist 969 Movement.

== Establishment ==
On 15 January 2014, PAM was formally established at a conference in Mandalay attended by prominent monks from across the country, with the mission of defending Theravada Buddhism in Burma. Its Pali name is Sāsana Vaṃsa Pāla (သာသနဝံသပါလ), which literally means "protector of race and Śāsana."

PAM may have been formed in response to the State Sangha Maha Nayaka Committee's prohibition of the '969' emblem for political uses.

== Leadership ==
PAM is led by a central committee composed of 52 members, including both senior scholar monks and nationalist monks. Ashin Wirathu is a prominent member of PAM and is described as "the leader of the most extreme fringe" of the group. PAM has extensive networks and chapters at state and township levels across Burma. PAM is currently chaired by the Ywama Sayadaw Ashin Tilokabhivamsa. Its headquarters are located Ywama Pariyatti Monastery (ရွာမပရိယတ္တိ စာသင်တိုက်), Insein Township, Yangon Region.

== Legislative lobbying ==
In 2013, the Burmese Ministry of Religious Affairs drafted 4 controversial Race and Religion Protection Laws designed to regulate religious conversion and interfaith marriage, and enforce monogamy and population-control measures, based on draft texts proposed by PAM members. In March 2015, the country's lower house, the Pyithu Hluttaw, approved two of the bills. The first of the 4 laws, which regulates population-control measures, was enacted in May 2015.

== Campaigns ==
In 2014, PAM members began a campaign against Ooredoo, a Qatar-based telecommunications company that had entered the country to build its cellular infrastructure.

In 2016 supporters of Ma Ba Tha campaigned against the Rohingya on Facebook.

== Later activities ==
In May 2017, the State Sangha Maha Nayaka Committee, which regulates the Buddhist clergy, ordered the group disbanded. The group renamed itself as the Buddha Dhamma Charity Foundation, which was also outlawed, according to government officials.

In June 2019, Brigadier General Zaw Min Tun donated 30 million kyats to the Buddha Dhamma Parahita Foundation, a successor group, after its members protested the government's lawsuit against their leader Wirathu.

Pauk Ko Taw, a monk who helped organize Pyusawhti militias, assisted in a rally calling for the resignation of Min Aung Hlaing from the Tatmadaw on 16 January 2024. Junta authorities briefly questioned him on 19 January but did not pursue criminal charges.

Pa Ka Ma, a monk who organized anti-Rohingya campaigns, criticized the Tatmadaw for burning villages in the Anyar region during Min Aung Hlaing's visit to India on 31 May 2026.

== See also ==
- Bodu Bala Sena
- 969 Movement
