= Buddhism and violence =

Buddhist attitudes to violence

Buddhism and violence looks at the historical and current examples of violent acts committed by Buddhists or groups connected to Buddhism, as well as the larger discussion of such behaviour within Buddhist traditions. Although Buddhism is generally seen as a religion that promotes compassion, nonviolence (ahimsa), and the reduction of suffering, there have been instances throughout its history where violence has been condoned or carried out in the name of Buddhist organisations or ideals. These include instances of Buddhist players participating in nationalist movements, sectarian conflicts, and monastic support for military actions.

Whether these incidents show how religion interacts with political, cultural, and social forces or whether they are departures from the essential teachings of Buddhism is a matter of debate among scholars. Examining how Buddhist teaching is interpreted and applied in various historical and geographical circumstances is still a focus of scholarly investigation.

According to one analysis, Buddhist violence tends to occur when the state and Buddhism are closely intertwined, as it emboldens Buddhist vigilantes to attack religious minorities.

== Teachings, interpretations, and practices ==
Monks, even if bandits were to carve you up savagely into pieces with a two-handled saw, he among you who let his heart get angered even at that would not be [a Buddhist].

— Buddha, Kakacūpama Sutta (MN 21)

Buddhism encompasses a variety of traditions, beliefs and spiritual practices largely based on teachings attributed to Gautama Buddha.

Nirvana is the oldest and most common term for the end goal of the Buddhist path and the ultimate eradication of duḥkha—the nature of life that innately includes "suffering", "pain", or "unsatisfactoriness". Violent actions and thoughts—actions that harm and debase others and thoughts that contemplate the same—stand in the way of spiritual growth and the self-conquest that leads to the goal of existence, and they are normally deemed unskilled (akusala) and cannot lead to the goal of Nirvana. Buddha condemned killing or harming living beings and encouraged reflection or mindfulness (satipatthana) as right action (or conduct), therefore "the rightness or wrongness of an action centers around whether the action itself would bring about harm to self and/or others". In the Ambalatthika-Rahulovada Sutta, the Buddha says to Rahula:

If you, Rahula, are desirous of doing a deed with the body, you should reflect on the deed with the body, thus: That deed which I am desirous of doing with the body is a deed of the body that might conduce to the harm of self and that might conduce to the harm of others and that might conduce to the harm of both; this deed of body is unskilled (akusala), its yield is anguish, its result is anguish.

The right action or right conduct (samyak-karmānta / sammā-kammanta) is the fourth aspect of the Noble Eightfold Path and it said that the practitioner should train oneself to be morally upright in one's activities, not acting in ways that would be corrupt or bring harm to oneself or to others. In the Chinese and Pali Canon, it is explained as:

And what is right action? Abstaining from taking life, from stealing, and from illicit sex [or sexual misconduct]. This is called right action.

— Saccavibhanga Sutta

For the lay follower, the Cunda Kammaraputta Sutta elaborates:

And how is one made pure in three ways by bodily action? There is the case where a certain person, abandoning the taking of life, abstains from the taking of life. He dwells with his... knife laid down, scrupulous, merciful, compassionate for the welfare of all living beings. Abandoning the taking of what is not given, he abstains from taking what is not given. He does not take, in the manner of a thief, things in a village or a wilderness that belong to others and have not been given by them.

Sarambha can be translated as "accompanied by violence". As the mind filled with lobha, dosa and moha (lust, hatred and delusion) is led to actions which are akusala. Indulging in violence is a form of self-harming. The rejection of violence in society is recognized in Buddhism as a prerequisite for the spiritual progress of society's members, because violence brings pain to beings with similar feelings to oneself. The Buddha is quoted in the Dhammapada as saying, "All are afraid of the stick, all hold their lives dear. Putting oneself in another's place, one should not beat or kill others". Metta (loving kindness), the development of mindstates of limitless good-will for all beings, and karuna, compassion that arises when you see someone suffering of the human being, are attitudes said to be excellent or sublime because they are the right or ideal way of conduct towards living beings (sattesu samma patipatti). The Sutta Nipata says "'As I am, so are these. As are these, so am I.' Drawing the parallel to yourself, neither kill nor get others to kill."

In Buddhism, to take refuge in the Dharma—one of the Three Jewels—one should not harm other sentient beings. The Nirvana Sutra states, "By taking refuge in the precious Dharma, One's minds should be free from hurting or harming others". One of the Five Precepts of Buddhist ethics or śīla states, "I undertake the training rule to abstain from killing." The Buddha reportedly stated, "Victory breeds hatred. The defeated live in pain. Happily the peaceful live giving up victory and defeat." These elements are used to indicate Buddhism is pacifistic and all violence done by Buddhists, even monks, is likely due to economic or political reasons.

The teaching of right speech (samyag-vāc / sammā-vācā) in the Noble Eightfold Path, condemn all speech that is in any way harmful (malicious and harsh speech) and divisive, encouraging to speak in thoughtful and helpful ways. The Pali Canon explained:

And what is right speech? Abstaining from lying, from divisive speech, from abusive speech, and from idle chatter: This is called right speech.

Michael Jerryson, Associate Professor of Religious Studies at Ohio's Youngstown State University and co-editor of the book Buddhist Warfare, said that "Buddhism differs in that the act of killing is less the focus than the 'intention' behind the killing" and "The first thing to remember is that people have a penchant for violence, it just so happens that every religion has people in it."

Gananath Obeyesekere, Emeritus Professor of Anthropology at Princeton University, said that "in the Buddhist doctrinal tradition... there is little evidence of intolerance, no justification for violence, no conception even of 'just wars' or 'holy wars.' ... one can make an assertion that Buddhist doctrine is impossible to reconcile logically with an ideology of violence and intolerance"

"Killing to save lives" is, uniquely amongst Buddhist schools, considered justified by certain Mahayana scriptures such as the Upaya-kaushalya Sutra, where, in a past life, Shakyamuni Buddha kills a robber intent on mass murder on a ship (with the intent both of saving the lives of the passengers and saving the robber from bad karma). K. Sri Dhammananda taught warfare is accepted as a last resort, quoting the Buddha's conversation with a soldier. The 14th Dalai Lama has also spoken on when it is permissible to kill another person. During a lecture he was giving at Harvard University in 2009, the Dalai Lama invoked the Upaya-kaushalya Sutra and said that "wrathful forceful action" motivated by compassion may be "violence on a physical level" but is "essentially nonviolence", and we must be careful to understand what "nonviolence" means. Following the killing of Osama bin Laden in 2011, the Dalai Lama endorsed his killing, stating "Forgiveness doesn't mean forget what happened. ... If something is serious and it is necessary to take counter-measures, you have to take counter-measures." During a question panel in 2015, in which he was asked if it would be justified to kill Hitler, Stalin, or Pol Pot, while they were early into their campaigns of genocide, the Dalai Lama stated that it would be justified, so long as they were not killed in anger.

In addition capital punishment for murder is justified according to this interpretation of Buddhism because the Judge is not seen as causing death but rather the actions of the murderer executed are.

There is also in Buddhism a long tradition of self-inflicted violence and death, as a form of asceticism or protest, as exemplified by the use of fires and burns to show determinations among Chinese monks, by the self-immolations of monks such as Thích Quảng Đức during the Vietnam war or Tibetan monks in support of Tibetan independence.

== Regional examples ==
=== Southeast Asia ===
==== Thailand ====
Kittivuddho (see, Kittiwuttho, spelling in translation varies) was a staunch follower of the Thai Sangha - the religious organization that leads the Buddhist movement in Thailand. The Sangha offers validity to the Thai government. If the ruling body shows fealty to the Sangha, then their actions are seen as legitimized and moral via the association. Likewise, the Sangha receives power and influence through the recognition of their partnership with the ruling government.

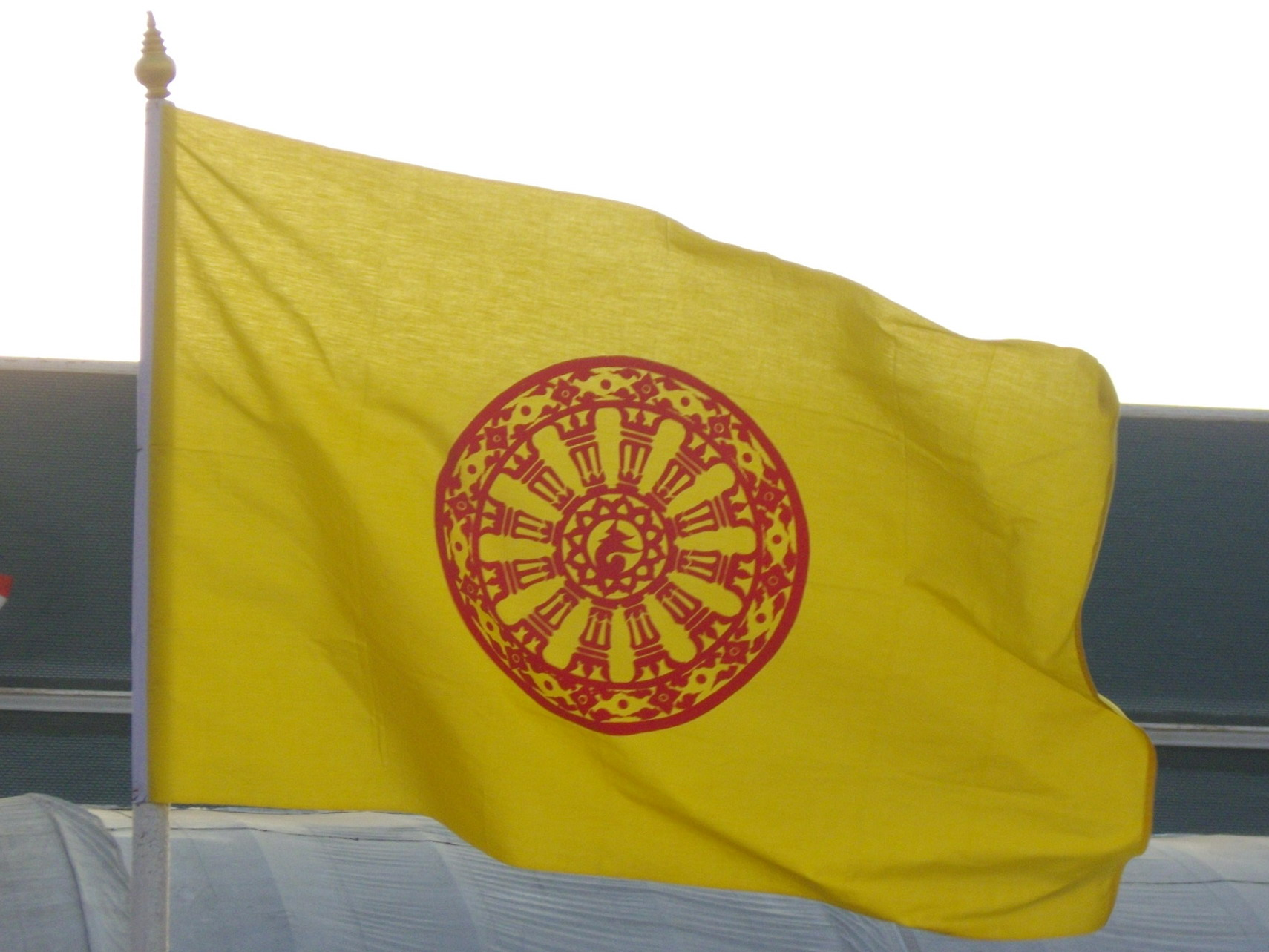
Thai Buddhist Flag

In the 1900s, the outbreak of World War I impacted then King of Siam, King Rama VI. Rama VI had studied and trained with the military in London, and thus felt it necessary to show his support for the allied forces. Thailand would not have been affected by the fighting in the West, nevertheless, Siam sent a voluntary cohort of 1,200 troops. Although they arrived too late to participate in the fighting, Rama VI received critical feedback from Abbot Phra Thep Moli Sirichantoe.

The Abbot's critique of Rama VI's decision - published in a book criticizing military knowledge as "evil", was likewise counter-critiqued by the Supreme Patriarch (at the time, Rama VI's uncle). The Supreme Patriarch brought attention to the concept of sacrifice in Buddhist teachings, and thus likened it to the sacrifice soldiers must make in defense of their homeland. In so doing, he used the teachings of Buddha to justify the violence thought necessary to protect a nation or culture in times of war, and the need to prepare for war in times of peace.

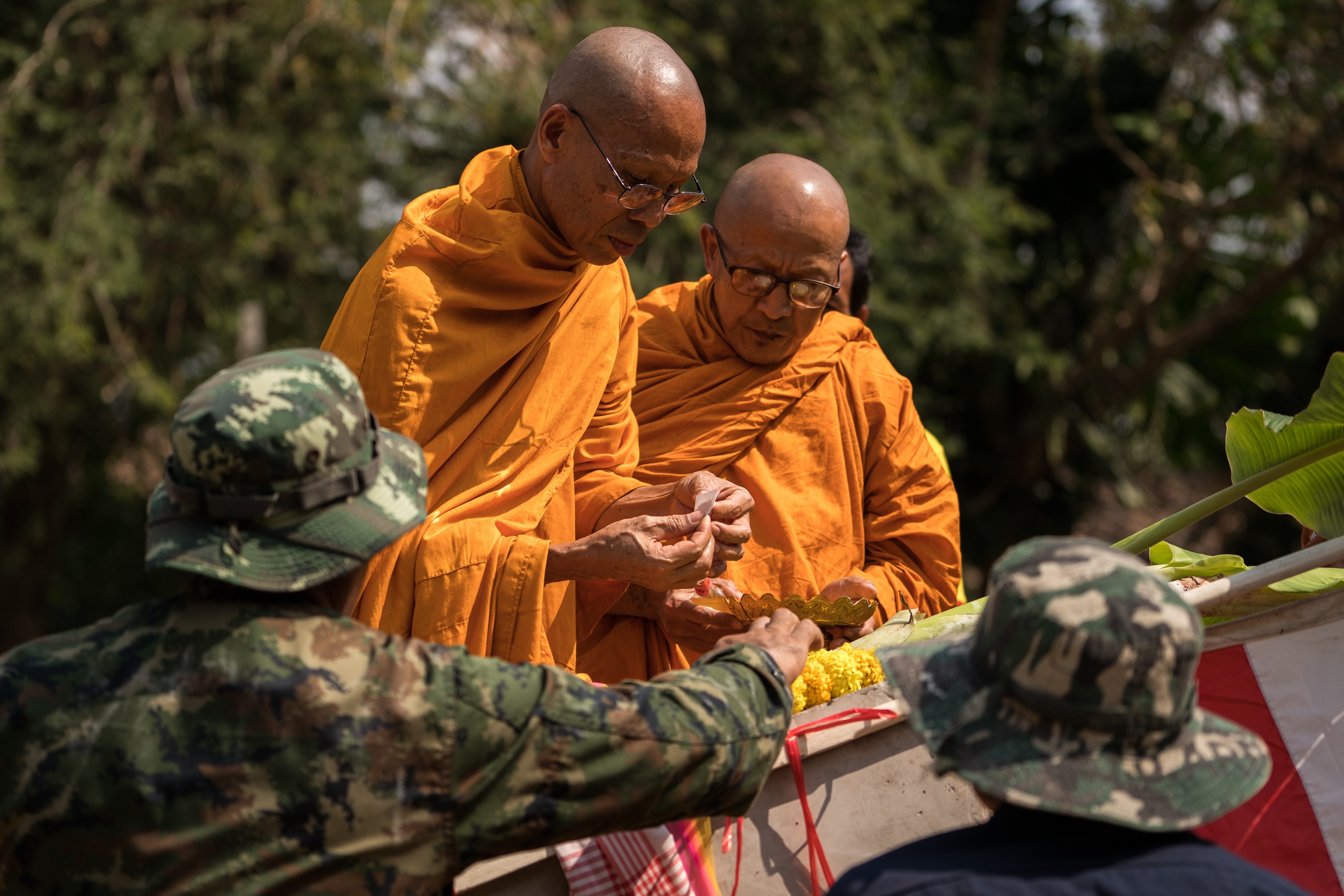
Thai Buddhist Monks blessing the primary pillar of a school during Exercise Cobra Gold - a set of humanitarian exercises in Thailand

The Supreme Patriarch likened the King's decisions to the necessary role of the leader or protector of a group or family to take the risk in leading others. The Supreme Patriarch quoted an ancient saying, "When a herd of cattle is fording a stream, if the leading ox leads straight, all the oxen will follow straight." Additionally, he compared the role of king or leader to that of a parent, who must ensure a child takes bitter medicine in times of illness. In so doing, he supports his argument that the King knew better than the Abbot, or than the citizenry, in his choice to supply soldiers to the Western Conflict in World War I.

These arguments, based in ancient proverb and justified through Buddhist relations of sacrifice, directly strike against the ancient story of Temija - a past life of Buddha that was shocked and appalled by the use of violence by governing leaders. While the story of Temija teaches against the use of violence in forms of punishment, the Supreme Patriarch instead utilized the concepts of sacrifice put forth through other Buddhist teachings to justify the use of violence by leaders, even to the point that violence for the sake of the nation would be viewed as virtuous.

===== 1970s Thai Buddhism =====
In the 1970s, Kittivuddho stated in an interview with Caturat (a news magazine from the period) that killing communists is, "not de-meritorius". Kittivuddho's assertion that the killing of Communists is forgiveable for Buddhists reflects earlier philosophies from Asanga and Buddhaghosa. Against the assertions sixty years prior of Phra Thep Moli, Kittivuddho did not see acts of violence and killing as a demerit within certain contexts.

These remarks followed the 1973 student-led uprising, as well as the creation of a Thai parliament and the spread of communism in neighboring East Asian countries. The fear of communism shaking the social forms of Thailand felt a very real threat to Kittivuddho, who expressed his nationalist tendencies in his defense of militant actions. He justified his argument by dehumanizing the Communists and leftists that he opposed. In the interview with Caturat he affirmed that this would not be the killing of people, but rather the killing of monsters/devils. He similarly asserted that while killing of people is prohibited and thus de-meritorious in Buddhist teachings, doing so for the "greater good" will garner greater merit than the act of killing will cost.

Kittivuddho's statements in the 1970s reflect the argument made in defense of King Rama VI by the Supreme Patriarch following the events of WWI. Kittivuddho, likewise, justifies his approval of the killing of communists by claiming that in so doing, the soldiers who commit these acts will gain greater merit than they will lose from the act. Like the Supreme Patriarch, he utilizes the concept of sacrifice for the sake of defending, "the country, the religion, and the institution of monarchy."

"He taught us to kill. Venerable sirs, you are likely to be suspicious about this teaching. I will tell you the sutta and you can investigate: (It is) the Kesi-sutta in the Kesiya-vagga, the sutta-nipitaka, anguttara-nikaya, catu-kaka-nipata. If you open (this text) venerable sirs, you will find that the Lord Buddha ordered killing."

— Kittivuddho, Gillberg, Christina 2006

Feelings of patriotism and the sense of national security are valued more highly than human lives in Kittivuddho's argument. Since defending the nation becomes the highest priority, or highest "value" for Thai Buddhist philosophy, the act of killing is seen as a sacrifice made by the killer, but one that is justified. By manipulating the literal definition of the words within Buddhist scriptures, Kittivuddho was able to support his position.

===== Thailand in the 2000s =====
Religious tensions in Thailand are directly related to the state's choice to represent Buddhism as the de facto state religion. The Thai monk is no longer only a Thai practitioner of Buddhism, but a figure for the Thai state. As the Thai monk has become an iconic representative of the Thai nation state, the refusal to acknowledge and/or the mistreatment of other religious practitioners in Thailand has resulted in strained relationships between religions. Such as in the early 2000s, when conflict between Malay Muslims (citizens and militants) began to rise in the southernmost provinces of Thailand, and less so between Thai Buddhist and Thai-Chinese Buddhists.

This rise in militant interactions rose with prominent events in 2004, and continued to build. On April 28th, 2004, the Thai military assaulted the Khru Se Mosque, resulting in over 100 deaths of militant Malay Muslims. That same October, peacefully protesting Malay Muslim citizens were met with intense police brutality, wherein the Thai military fired upon and suffocated as many as 80 Malay Muslim citizens

==== Myanmar ====
In recent years the State Peace and Development Council (SPDC), the military regime of Burma from 1988 to 2011, had strongly encouraged the conversion of ethnic minorities, often by force, as part of its campaign of assimilation. The regime promoted a vision of Burmese Buddhist nationalism as a cultural and a political ideology to legitimise its contested rule, trying to bring a religious syncretism between Buddhism and its totalitarian ideology.

The Saffron Revolution, a series of economic and political protests and demonstrations that took place during 2007, were led by students, political activists, including women, and Buddhist monks and took the form of a campaign of nonviolent resistance, sometimes also called civil resistance.

In response to the protests dozens of protesters were arrested or detained. Starting in September 2007 the protests were led by thousands of Buddhist monks, and those protests were allowed to proceed until a renewed government crackdown in late September 2007. At least 184 protesters were shot and killed and many were tortured. Under the SPDC, the Burmese army engaged in military offensives against ethnic minority populations, committing acts that violated international humanitarian law.

Flag of the Democratic Karen Buddhist Army

Myanmar had become a stronghold of Buddhist aggression and such acts are spurred by hardline nationalistic monks. The oldest militant organisation active in the region is Democratic Karen Buddhist Army (DKBA), headed by a Buddhist monk U Thuzana, since 1992. In the recent years the monks, and the terrorist acts, are associated with the nationalist 969 Movement particularly in Myanmar and neighboring nations. The violence reached prominence in June 2012 when more than 200 people were killed and around 100,000 were displaced. As of 2012, the "969" movement by monks (the prominent among whom is Wirathu) had helped create anti-Islamic nationalist movements in the region, and have urged Myanmar Buddhists to boycott Muslim services and trades, resulting in persecution of Muslims in Burma by Buddhist-led mobs. However, not all of the culprits were Buddhists and the motives were as much economic as religious. On 20 June 2013, Wirathu was mentioned on the cover story of Time magazine as "The Face of Buddhist Terror". According to the Human Rights Watch report, the Burmese government and local authorities played a key role in the forcible displacement of more than 125,000 Rohingya people and other Muslims in the region. The report further specifies the coordinated attacks of October 2012 that were carried out in different cities by Burmese officials, community leaders and Buddhist monks to terrorize and forcibly relocate the population. The violence of Meiktila, Lashio (2013) and Mandalay (2014) are the latest Buddhist violence in Burma.

Michael Jerryson, author of several books heavily critical of Buddhism's traditional peaceful perceptions, stated that, "The Burmese Buddhist monks may not have initiated the violence but they rode the wave and began to incite more. While the ideals of Buddhist canonical texts promote peace and pacifism, discrepancies between reality and precepts easily flourish in times of social, political and economic insecurity, such as Myanmar's current transition to democracy."

However several Buddhist leaders including Thích Nhất Hạnh, Bhikkhu Bodhi, Shodo Harada and the Dalai Lama among others condemned the violence against Muslims in Myanmar and called for peace, supporting the practice of the fundamental Buddhist principles of non-harming, mutual respect and compassion. The Dalai Lama said "Buddha always teaches us about forgiveness, tolerance, compassion. If from one corner of your mind, some emotion makes you want to hit, or want to kill, then please remember Buddha's faith. We are followers of Buddha." He said that "All problems must be solved through dialogue, through talk. The use of violence is outdated, and never solves problems."

Maung Zarni, a Burmese democracy advocate, human rights campaigner, and a research fellow at the London School of Economics who has written on the violence in Myanmar and Sri Lanka, states that there is no room for fundamentalism in Buddhism. "No Buddhist can be nationalistic", said Zarni, "There is no country for Buddhists. I mean, no such thing as 'me,' 'my' community, 'my' country, 'my' race or even 'my' faith."

=== South Asia ===
==== India ====
Ashokavadana (a text from 3rd cent CE) states that there was a mass killing of Ajivikas for drawing a figure of the Buddha bowing down to the Nataputta by Emperor Ashoka in which around 18,000 Ajivikas were killed. However this account is controversial. According to K. T. S. Sarao and Benimadhab Barua, stories of persecutions of rival sects by Ashoka appear to be a clear fabrication arising out of sectarian propaganda. At that time, the custom of representing Buddha in human form had not started, and the text conflates Nirgranthas and Ajivikas.

==== Sri Lanka ====
Buddhism in Sri Lanka has a unique history and has played an important role in the shaping of Sinhalese nationalist identity. Consequently, politicized Buddhism has contributed to ethnic tensions and protracted social conflict in the island between the majority Sinhalese Buddhist population and other minorities, especially the Tamils and Sri Lankan Muslims.

Statues of Buddha in Dambulla, Sri Lanka

Violence in Sri Lanka pertaining to Buddhism has been present for decades. This violence originated years ago with the persecution of the Tamil people by the Sinhalese majority. However, after years of discrimination, the Tamil formed the Liberation Tigers of Tamil Eelam (LTTE) which fought for the North-East region of Sri Lanka which would become an independent state for the Tamil population. This civil war went on three decades before the war ended in May 2009 when the majority Sinhalese government killed LTTE leader Velupillai Prabhakaran.

One of the first major examples of persecution against Muslims was on September 10, 2011 when Buddhist monks destroyed a 300 year old Muslim shrine in Anuradhapura Although police officers were present during the attack, none intervened.

On April 20, 2012, roughly 2000 Buddhist protested outside a mosque in Dambulla because the building stood on a sacred site for Sri Lankan Buddhists. These protests caused the mosque to cancel prayers due to threats from Buddhist nationalists, but on the following Sunday, Prime Minister D. M. Jayaratne ordered to have the mosque relocated from the sacred site. Since then, the Bodu Bala Sena (BBS) a Buddhist nationalist organization led by Galagoda Aththe Gnanasat, has taken on a new form of persecution by using slogans and propaganda as a way of discriminating against Muslims in Sri Lanka.

With the recent April 2019 Easter bombings orchestrated by Islamic terrorists that claimed the lives of over 250 and injured over 500 Sri Lankans, Muslims in Sri Lanka have faced more danger than ever before from the police and Buddhist nationalists.

===== Mytho-historical roots =====
The mytho-historical accounts in the Sinhalese Buddhist national chronicle Mahavamsa ('Great Chronicle'), a non-canonical text written in the sixth century CE by Buddhist monks to glorify Buddhism in Sri Lanka, have been influential in the creation of Sinhalese Buddhist nationalism and militant Buddhism.

The Mahavamsa states that Lord Buddha made three visits to Sri Lanka in which he rids the island of forces inimical to Buddhism and instructs deities to protect the ancestors of the Sinhalese (Prince Vijaya and his followers from North India) to enable the establishment and flourishing of Buddhism in Sri Lanka. This myth has led to the widely held Sinhalese Buddhist belief that the country is Sihadipa (island of the Sinhalese) and Dhammadipa (the island ennobled to preserve and propagate Buddhism). Buddha's riddance of anti-Buddhist forces has been interpreted as legitimizing violence in defense of Buddhism and the political unification of the island under Buddhist rule.

In other words, Sinhalese Buddhist nationalists maintain that they are the Buddha's chosen people, and that the island of Sri Lanka is the Buddhist promised land.

The Mahavamsa also describes an account of the Buddhist warrior king Dutugamunu and his army battling and defeating the Tamil king Elara, who had come from South India and usurped power in Anuradhapura (the island's capital at the time). When Dutugamunu laments over the many he has killed, the eight arhats (Buddha's enlightened disciples) who come to console him reply that no real sin has been committed by him because he has only killed Tamil unbelievers who are no better than beasts.

Dutugamunu's campaign against king Elara was simply to restore Buddhism through a united Sri Lanka under a Buddhist monarch, even by the use of violence. The Mahavamsa story about Buddha's visit to Sri Lanka where he (referred to as the "Conqueror") subdues forces inimical to Buddhism, the Yakkhas (depicted as the non-human inhabitants of the island), by striking "terror to their hearts" and driving them from their homeland, so that his doctrine should eventually "shine in glory", has been described as providing the warrant for the use of violence for the sake of Buddhism and as an account that is in keeping with the general message of the author that the political unity of Sri Lanka under Buddhism requires the removal of uncooperative groups.

According to Neil DeVotta (an Associate Professor of Political Science), the mytho-history described in the Mahavamsa "justifies dehumanizing non-Sinhalese, if doing so is necessary to preserve, protect, and propagate the dhamma (Buddhist doctrine). Furthermore, it legitimizes a just war doctrine, provided that war is waged to protect Buddhism. Together with the Vijaya myth, it introduces the bases for the Sinhalese Buddhist belief that Lord Buddha designated the island of Sri Lanka as a repository for Theravada Buddhism. It claims the Sinhalese were the first humans to inhabit the island (as those who predated the Sinhalese were subhuman) and are thus the true "sons of the soil". Additionally, it institutes the belief that the island's kings were beholden to protect and foster Buddhism. All of these legacies have had ramifications for the trajectory of political Buddhism and Sinhalese Buddhist nationalism."

===== Rise of modern Sinhalese-Buddhist nationalism =====
With the rise of modern Sinhalese Buddhist nationalism in the late nineteenth and early twentieth centuries as a reaction to the changes brought under the British colonialism, the old religious mytho-history of the Mahavamsa (especially the emphasis on the Sinhalese and Tamil ethnicities of Dutugamunu and Elara, respectively) was revitalized and consequently would prove to be detrimental to the intergroup harmony in the island. As Heather Selma Gregg writes: "Modern-day Sinhalese nationalism, rooted in local myths of being a religiously chosen people and of special progeny, demonstrates that even a religion perceived as inherently peaceful can help fuel violence and hatred in its name." During the popularization of the Mahavamsa, the first riot in modern Sri Lankan history broke out in 1883, between Buddhists and Catholics, highlighting the "growing religious divide between the two communities".

Buddhist revivalist Anagarika Dharmapala, often described as the founder of modern Sinhalese Buddhist nationalism, promoted an exclusivist ideology that fused Sinhalese ethnic identity with Buddhism. Drawing on Mahavamsa narratives, he portrayed Tamils as historical enemies of Buddhism, asserted Sinhalese racial superiority, expressed hostility toward Muslims and other religions, and helped lay the ideological foundations for an ethnocentric state that marginalized minorities.

Anagarika Dharmapala also popularized the impression that Tamils and Sinhalese had been deadly enemies in Sri Lanka for nearly 2,000 years by quoting the Mahavamsa passages that depicted Tamils as pagan invaders. He characterized the Tamils as "fiercely antagonistic to Buddhism".

===== Politicized Buddhism, the formation of ethnocracy and the civil war =====
Upon independence, Sinhalese ultra-nationalist Buddhist elites instituted discriminatory policies based on the Buddhist ethno-nationalist ideology of the Mahavamsa, which privileges Sinhalese Buddhist hegemony in the island as Buddha's chosen people for whom the island is a promised land and justifies subjugation of minorities. Some Sinhalese Buddhist officials saw that decreasing Tamil influence was a necessary part of fostering Buddhist cultural renaissance. The Dutugamunu myth was also used to institute Sinhalese Buddhist dominance, with some politicians even identifying with such a mytho-historic hero, and activist monks looked to Dutugamunu as an example to imitate.

Buddhist monks became increasingly involved in post-independence politics, promoting Sinhalese Buddhist interests at the expense of minorities. Walpola Rahula, Sri Lanka's foremost Buddhist monk scholar and one of the leading proponents of Sinhalese Buddhist nationalism, played a major role in advocating for the involvement of monks in politics, using Buddhist king Dutugamunu's relationship with the sangha to bolster his position. Rahula also argued for a just war doctrine to protect Buddhism by using the example of wars waged by Dutugamunu to restore Buddhism. Rahula portrayed Dutugamunu as the origin of a militant Sinhala Buddhist nationalism that fused ethnic identity with Buddhism and marginalized non-Buddhists. Anthropologist H.L. Seneviratne argues that Rahula advanced a politicized Buddhism that endorsed Sinhala Buddhist exclusivism, close ties between monks and the state, and the justification of violence to protect the religion.

In 1956, the All Ceylon Buddhist Congress (ACBC) released a report titled "The Betrayal of Buddhism", arguing that Buddhism had been weakened by historical and colonial threats such as the Tamil invaders mentioned in the Mahavamsa and later Western colonial powers and calling on the state to restore and privilege Buddhism. S. W. R. D. Bandaranaike adopted its recommendations during his election campaign, drawing on Sinhalese Buddhist nationalist ideas rooted in the Mahavamsa, and won power with the support of Buddhist monks and organizations.

Bandaranaike had also campaigned on the basis of Sinhalese Buddhist nationalism, arguing that it was the duty of the government to preserve the Sinhalese Buddhist nature of the island's destiny. Once in power, Bandaranaike implemented the 1956 Sinhala Only Act, which would make Sinhala the country's official language and hence all official state transactions would be conducted in Sinhala. This put non-Sinhala speakers at a disadvantage for employment and educational opportunities. As a result, Tamils protested the policy by staging sit-ins, which in turn prompted counterdemonstrations by extremist Buddhist monks, later degenerating into anti-Tamil riots in which more than one hundred people were injured and Tamil businesses were looted. Riots then spread throughout the country, killing hundreds of people. Bandaranaike tried to mitigate tensions over the language policy by proposing a compromise with the Tamil leaders, resulting in a 1957 pact that would allow the use of Tamil as an administrative language along with Sinhala and greater political autonomy for Tamils.

Efforts to reach a compromise with Tamil leaders in 1957 were strongly opposed by ultra-nationalist Buddhist monks and activists. It had become common for politicians and monks to exploit the Mahavamsa narrative of Dutugamunu to oppose any concession to the Tamil minorities.

Nationalist Buddhist monks successfully convinced Bandaranaike to cancel the pact in 1958. Soon after abrogation, another series of anti-Tamil riots spread throughout the country, which left hundreds dead and thousands displaced. In the lead-up to the riots, nationalist rhetoric by Buddhist monks and politicians portrayed Tamils as enemies of both the state and Buddhism, drawing on Mahavamsa narratives, particularly the story of Dutugamunu, to frame Sri Lanka as a Sinhalese Buddhist promised land and legitimize the use of force. As Tessa J. Bartholomeusz explained: "Tamil claims to a homeland were met with an ideology, linked to a Buddhist story, that legitimated war with just cause: the protection of Sri Lanka for the Sinhala-Buddhist people."

Opposition to concessions for Tamil autonomy intensified, culminating in the 1959 assassination of Bandaranaike by an ultra-nationalist Buddhist monk who claimed to act in defense of country, race, and religion. It has also been suggested that the monk was guided in part by reading of the Mahavamsa.

Successive governments after Bandaranaike implemented a similar Sinhalese Buddhist nationalist agenda, at the expense of minorities. In 1972, the government rewrote its constitution and gave Buddhism "the foremost place [in the Republic of Sri Lanka]" and making it "the duty of the state to protect and foster Buddhism". With another pact in 1965 that sought to establish greater regional autonomy for Tamils being abrogated (some members of the Buddhist clergy were at the forefront in opposing the pact) and the implementation of discriminatory quota system in 1974 that severely restricted Tamil entrance to universities, Tamil youth became radicalized, calling for an independent homeland to be established in the Tamil-dominated northeastern region of the island. In 1977, anti-Tamil riots spread throughout the country, killing hundreds of Tamils and leaving thousands homeless. A leading monk claimed that one of the reasons for the anti-Tamil riots of 1977 was the Tamil demonization of the Sinhalese Buddhist epic hero Dutthagamani, which resulted in a justified retaliation. Another anti-Tamil riot erupted in 1981 in Jaffna, where Sinhalese police and paramilitaries destroyed statues of Tamil cultural and religious figures; looted and torched a Hindu temple and Tamil-owned shops and homes; killed four Tamils; and torched the Jaffna Public Library which was of great cultural significance to Tamils. In response to the militant separatist Tamil group LTTE killing 13 Sinhalese soldiers, the largest anti-Tamil pogrom occurred in 1983, leaving between 2,000 and 3,000 of Tamils killed and forcing from 70,000 to 100,000 Tamils into refugee camps, eventually propelling the country into a civil war between the LTTE and the predominately Sinhalese Buddhist Sri Lankan government.

During the Black July pogrom, in which thousands of Tamils were killed and tens of thousands displaced, Buddhist monks lead rioters in some instance. Cyril Mathew, a Senior Minister in President Jayawardene's Cabinet and a Sinhalese Buddhist nationalist who in the year preceding the pogrom reaffirmed the special relationship between Buddhism and Sinhalese and the Buddhist nature of the country, was also responsible for the pogrom. In the aftermath, media and political discourse increasingly depicted Tamils as interlopers on a Buddhist land, drawing on Mahavamsa narratives such as Dutugamunu’s defeat of Elara to justify violence. The resulting “sons of the soil” ideology framed Sri Lanka as a sacred Theravada Buddhist domain, delegitimized Tamil claims to a homeland, and was invoked by state actors to oppose territorial division.

In response to violent Tamil separatism, militant Buddhist monks founded the Mavbima Surakime Vyaparaya (MSV) in 1986 which sought to work with political parties "to maintain territorial unity of Sri Lanka and Sinhalese Buddhist sovereignty over the island". The MSV used the Mahavamsa to justify its goals, which included the usage of force to fight against the Tamil threat and defend the Buddhist state. In 1987, along with the MSV, the Janatha Vimukthi Peramuna, a militant Sinhalese nationalist group which included monks took up arms to protest the signing of the Indo-Sri Lanka Accord, believing it would compromise the sovereignty of Sri Lanka.

From the beginning of the civil war in 1983 to the end of it in 2009, militant Buddhist monks were involved in politics and opposed negotiations, ceasefire agreements, or any devolution of power to Tamil minorities, and most supported military solution to the conflict. It has been argued that the absence of opportunities for power sharing among the different ethnic groups in the island "has been one of the primary factors behind the intensification of the conflict".

Numerous nationalist Buddhist religious leaders and extremist Buddhist organizations since the country's independence have played a role in mobilizing against the devolution of power to the Tamils. Leading Buddhist monks opposed devolution of power that would grant regional autonomy to Tamils on the basis of Mahavamsa worldview that the entire country is a Buddhist promised land which belongs to the Sinhalese Buddhist people, along with the fear that devolution would eventually lead to separate country.

In the 2000s, the two major political parties to advocate for Sinhalese Buddhist nationalism were the JVP and the Jathika Hela Urumaya (JHU) or "National Heritage Party", the latter of which was composed solely of nationalist Buddhist monks. According to A. R. M. Imtiyaz, these groups share common goals: "to uphold Buddhism and establish a link between the state and religion, and to advocate a violent solution to the Tamil question and oppose all form of devolution to the minorities, particularly the Tamils". The JHU, in shunning non-violent solutions to the ethnic conflict, urged young Sinhalese Buddhists to sign up for the army, with as many as 30,000 Sinhalese young men doing so and called for violence to be used against opponents of a military solution.

One JHU leader even declared that NGOs and certain government servants were traitors and they should be set on fire and burnt due to their opposition to a military solution to the civil war. The international community encouraged a federal structure for Sri Lanka as a peaceful solution to the civil war but any form of Tamil self-determination, even the more limited measure of autonomy, was strongly opposed by hard-line Sinhalese Buddhist nationalist groups such as the JVP and JHU, who pushed for the military solution.

These groups in their hard-line support for a military solution to the conflict, without any regard for the plight of innocent Tamil civilians, have opposed negotiated settlement, ceasefire agreement, demanded that the Norwegians be removed as peace facilitators, demanded the war to be prosecuted more forcefully and exerted influence in the Rajapaksa government, resulting in the brutal military defeat of the LTTE with heavy civilian casualties. The nationalist monks' support of the government's military offense against the LTTE gave "religious legitimacy to the state's claim of protecting the island for the Sinhalese Buddhist majority." President Rajapaksa, in his war against the LTTE, has been compared to the Buddhist king Dutugamunu by the Sinhalese Buddhist nationalists.

===== Violence against religious minorities =====
Other minority groups have also come under attack by Sinhalese Buddhist nationalists. Fear of country's Buddhist hegemony being challenged by Christian proselytism has driven extremist Buddhist monks and organizations to demonize Christian organizations, with one popular monk comparing missionary activity to terrorism; as a result, Sinhalese Buddhist nationalists, including the JVP and JHU, who oppose attempts to convert Buddhists to another religion, support or conduct anti-Christian violence. The number of attacks against Christian churches rose from 14 in 2000 to over 100 in 2003. Dozens of these acts were confirmed by U.S. diplomatic observers.

This anti-Christian violence was led by extremist Buddhist clergy and has included acts of "beatings, arson, acts of sacrilege, death threats, violent disruption of worship, stoning, abuse, unlawful restraint, and even interference with funerals". It has been noted that the strongest anti-West sentiments accompany the anti-Christian violence since the Sinhalese Buddhist nationalists identify Christianity with the West which they think is conspiring to undermine Buddhism.

In the postwar Sri Lanka, ethnic and religious minorities continue to face threat from Sinhalese Buddhist nationalism. There have been continued sporadic attacks on Christian churches by Buddhist extremists who allege that Christians conduct unethical or forced conversion. The Pew Research Center has listed Sri Lanka among the countries with very high religious hostilities in 2012 due to the violence committed by Buddhist monks against Muslim and Christian places of worship. These acts included attacking a mosque and forcefully taking over a Seventh-day advent church and converting it into a Buddhist temple.

Extremist Buddhist leaders justify their attacks on the places of worship of minorities by arguing that Sri Lanka is the promised land of the Sinhalese Buddhists to safeguard Buddhism. The recently formed Buddhist extremist group, the Bodu Bala Sena (BBS), or Buddhist Power Force, founded by extreme Buddhist monks in 2012, has been accused of inciting the anti-Muslim riots that killed 4 Muslims and injured 80 in 2014. The leader of the BBS, in linking the government's military victory over the LTTE to the ancient Buddhist king conquest of Tamil king Elara, said that Tamils have been taught a lesson twice and warned other minorities of the same fate if they tried to challenge Sinhalese Buddhist culture. The BBS has been compared to the Taliban, accused of spreading extremism and communal hatred against Muslims and has been described as an "ethno-religious fascist movement".

===== Buddhist opposition to Buddhist violence =====
The BBS has received criticism and opposition from other Buddhist clergy and politicians. Mangala Samaraweera, a Sri Lankan Theravada Buddhist politician, accused the BBS of being "a representation of 'Taliban' terrorism" and of spreading extremism and communal hatred against Muslims. Samaraweera has also alleged that the BBS is secretly funded by the Ministry of Defence. Anunayake Bellanwila Wimalaratana, deputy incumbent of Bellanwila Rajamaha Viharaya and President of the Bellanwila Community Development Foundation, has stated that "The views of the Bodu Bala Sena are not the views of the entire Sangha community" and that "We don't use our fists to solve problems, we use our brains". Wataraka Vijitha Thero, a Buddhist monk who condemns violence against Muslims and heavily criticized the BBS and the government, has been attacked and tortured for his stances.

Sinhala Buddhist nationalism has also faced opposition from the Sarvodaya Shramadana Movement, led by the Buddhist thinker A. T. Ariyaratne, which rejects violence and emphasizes non-violence and social transformation grounded in Buddhist principles. Ariyaratne has consistently advocated peace through selflessness, compassion, and collective awakening.

=== East Asia ===
==== Japan ====
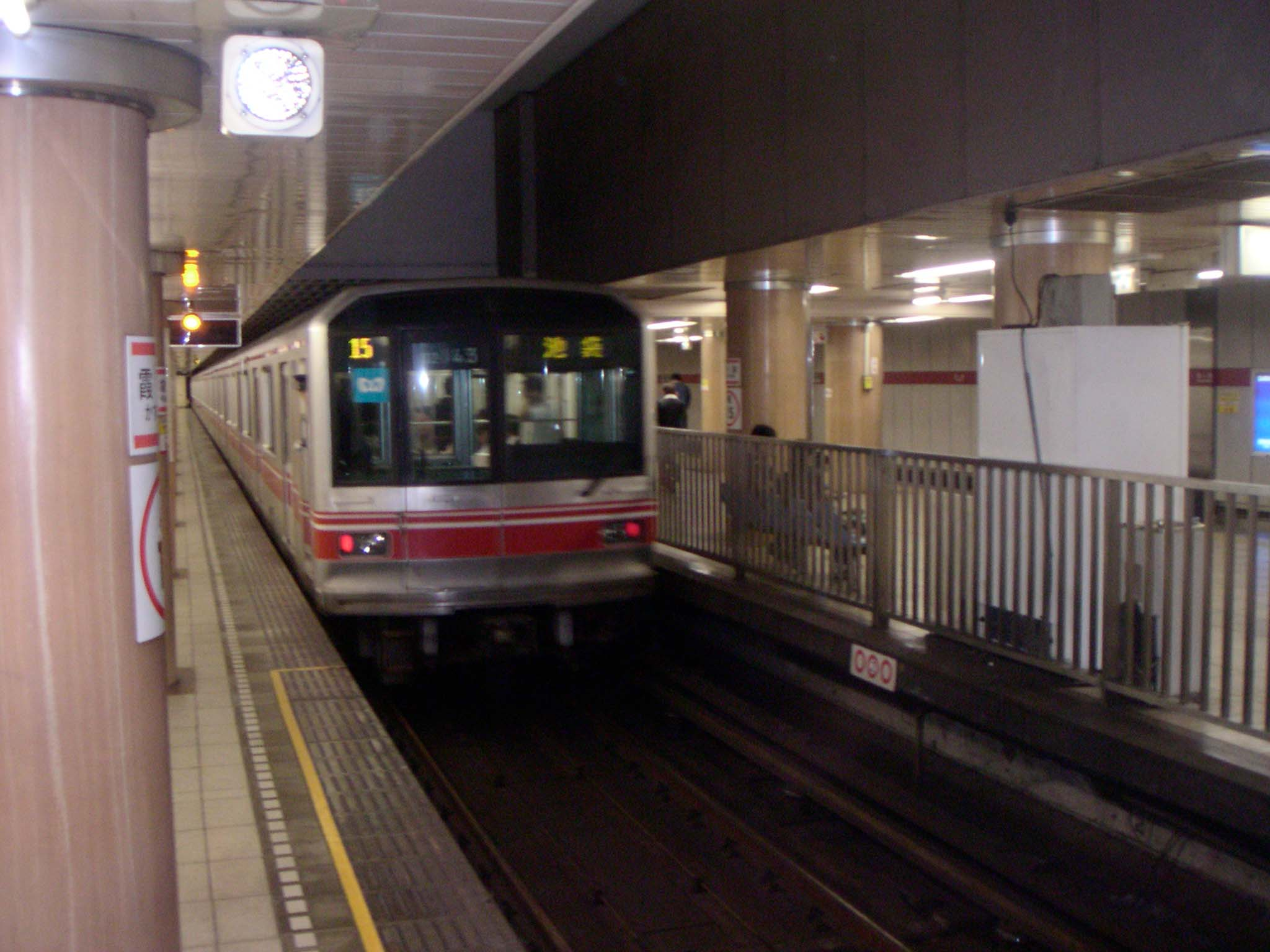
Kasumigaseki Station in Japan, one of the many stations affected during the attack by the Aum Shinrikyo cult

The beginning of "Buddhist violence" in Japan relates to a long history of feuds among Buddhists. The sōhei or "warrior monks" appeared during the Heian period, although the seeming contradiction in being a Buddhist "warrior monk" caused controversy even at the time. More directly linked is that the Ikkō-shū movement was considered an inspiration to Buddhists in the Ikkō-ikki rebellion. In Osaka they defended their temple with the slogan "The mercy of Buddha should be recompensed even by pounding flesh to pieces. One's obligation to the Teacher should be recompensed even by smashing bones to bits!"

During World War II, Japanese Buddhist literature from that time, as part of its support of the Japanese war effort, stated "In order to establish eternal peace in East Asia, arousing the great benevolence and compassion of Buddhism, we are sometimes accepting and sometimes forceful. We now have no choice but to exercise the benevolent forcefulness of 'killing one in order that many may live' (issatsu tashō). This is something which Mahayana Buddhism approves of only with the greatest of seriousness..." Almost all Japanese Buddhists temples strongly supported Japan's militarization. These were heavily criticized by the Chinese Buddhists of the era, who disputed the validity of the statements made by those Japanese Buddhist supporters of the war. In response the Japanese Pan-Buddhist Society (Myowa Kai) rejected the criticism and stated that "We now have no choice but to exercise the benevolent forcefulness of 'killing one in order that many may live' (issatsu tashō)" and that the war was absolutely necessary to implement the dharma in Asia. The society re-examined more than 70 texts written by Nichiren and re-edited his writings, making changes in 208 places, cutting all the statements that disagreed with the state Shinto. In contrast, a few Japanese Buddhists such as Ichikawa Haku and Girō Senoo opposed this and were targeted. During the 1940s, "leaders of the Honmon Hokkeshu and Soka Kyoiku Gakkai were imprisoned for their defiance of wartime government religious policy, which mandated display of reverence for the state Shinto". Brian Daizen Victoria, a Buddhist priest in the Sōtō Zen sect, documented in his book Zen at War how Buddhist institutions justified Japanese militarism in official publications and cooperated with the Imperial Japanese Army in the Russo-Japanese War and World War II. In response to the book, several sects issued an apology for their wartime support of the government.

In more modern times instances of Buddhist-inspired terrorism or militarism have occurred in Japan, such as the assassinations of the League of Blood Incident led by Nissho Inoue, a Nichirenist or fascist-nationalist who preached a self-styled Nichiren Buddhism.

Aum Shinrikyo, the Japanese new religion and doomsday cult that was the cause of the Tokyo subway sarin attack that killed thirteen people and injured more than a thousand, drew upon a syncretic view of idiosyncratic interpretations of elements of early Indian Buddhism, Tibetan Buddhism and Hinduism, taking Shiva as the main image of worship, Christian millennialist ideas from the Book of Revelation, Yoga and the writings of Nostradamus. Its founder, Chizuo Matsumoto, claimed that he sought to restore "original Buddhism" and declared himself "Christ", Japan's only fully enlightened master and identified with the "Lamb of God". His purported mission was to take upon himself the sins of the world, and he claimed he could transfer to his followers spiritual power and ultimately take away their sins and bad deeds. While many discount Aum Shinrikyo's Buddhist characteristics and affiliation to Buddhism, scholars often refer to it as an offshoot of Japanese Buddhism, and this was how the movement generally defined and saw itself.

=== North Asia ===
==== Russia ====
In 2022, Khambo Lama Damba Ayusheev, the head of the Buddhist Traditional Sangha of Russia (BTSR), the largest Buddhist denomination in Russia, voiced support for the Russian invasion of Ukraine.

== See also ==
- Ahimsa in Buddhism
- Buddhism and capital punishment
- Buddhist ethics
- Five precepts
- Persecution of Buddhists
- Religious nationalism

=== Other religions ===
- Christianity and violence
- Hindu terrorism
- Islam and violence
- Judaism and violence

== Sources ==
=== Web ===
- Bartholomeusz, Tessa J. (2005), In Defense of Dharma: Just-War Ideology in Buddhist Sri Lanka (PDF), Routledge, ISBN 978-1-135-78857-5, archived from the original on 2013-05-26 Via Google Books
- Bhikkhu, Thanissaro (1996), Magga-vibhanga Sutta, Access to Insight
- Bhikkhu, Thanissaro (1997), Cunda Kammaraputta Sutta, Access to Insight
- Bhikkhu, Thanissaro (2005), Saccavibhanga Sutta, Access to Insight
- Bhikkhu, Thanissaro (2008), Maha-cattarisaka Sutta, Access to Insight
- Codrington, H. W. (1926). A Short History Of Ceylon. London: Macmillan & Co.
- de Silva, K. M. (1981). A History of Sri Lanka. University of California Press. ISBN 9780520043206.
- DeVotta, Neil (2007), Sinhalese Buddhist Nationalist Ideology: Implications for Politics and Conflict Resolution in Sri Lanka (PDF), East-West Center Washington, ISBN 978-1-932728-64-4, archived from the original (PDF) on 2016-03-12
- Harris, Elizabeth J. (1994), Violence and Disruption in Society A Study of early Buddhist Texts, Buddhist Publication Society
- Shadbolt, Peter (2013), Conflict in Buddhism: 'Violence for the sake of peace?', CNN
- Ṭhānissaro Bhikkhu (n.d.). "MN 21 Kakacūpama Sutta". dhammatalks.org. Translated by Ṭhānissaro Bhikkhu.
- Thera, Nyanaponika (1994), The Four Sublime StatesContemplations on Love, Compassion, Sympathetic Joy and Equanimity

=== Print ===
- Barbaro, Paolo (2010), "Buddhism and Violence". In: Jeffrey Ian Ross (ed.), Religion and Violence: an Encyclopedia of Faith and Conflict from Antiquity to the Present, vol. 1, M. E. Sharpe, ISBN 978-0-7656-2048-4
- Baroni, Helen Josephine (January 2002), The Illustrated Encyclopedia of Zen Buddhism, The Rosen Publishing Group, ISBN 978-0-8239-2240-6
- Bodhi, Bhikkhu (2010), The Noble Eightfold Path: The Way to the End of Suffering, Buddhist Publication Society, ISBN 978-955-24-0116-9
- Brannigan, Michael C. (January 2010), Striking a Balance: A Primer in Traditional Asian Values, Rowman & Littlefield, ISBN 978-0-7391-3846-5
- Buswell, Robert E.; Lopez, Donald S. (2013), The Princeton Dictionary of Buddhism, Princeton University, ISBN 978-1-4008-4805-8
- Chitkara, M. G. (1999), Encyclopaedia of Buddhism: a world faith. The dhammapada stories, verses & commentary, APH Publishing Corporation, p. 166, ISBN 978-81-7648-180-9
- Clayton, Barbra R. (2006), Moral Theory in Santideva's Siksasamuccaya: Cultivating the Fruits of Virtue, Routledge, ISBN 978-1-134-27829-9
- de Silva, K. M. (2005). A History of Sri Lanka. Colombo: Vijitha Yapa Publications. ISBN 9789558095928.
- Deegalle, Mahinda (2006), Buddhism, Conflict and Violence in Modern Sri Lanka, Routledge, ISBN 978-0-415-54441-2
- Fausböll, Viggo (1881), The Sutta-Nipata, Clarendon Press
- Gampopa; Gyaltsen Rinpoche, Khenpo Konchog (1998), Jewel Ornament of Liberation: The Wish-fulfilling Gem of the Noble Teachings, Snow Lion Publications, ISBN 978-1-55939-872-5
- Gowans, Christopher (2004), Philosophy of the Buddha: An Introduction, Routledge, ISBN 1-134-46973-X
- Gnanananda Thero, Kiribathgoda; Jayasinghe, Hemamala (2002), The Supreme Bliss of Nibbana, a Goal Within Our Reach: Maha Satipatthāna Sutta: Translation of Ea Ama Nivansuva Boho Dura Nove, Dayawansa Jayakody & Company, ISBN 978-955-551-211-4
- Ganguly, Sumit; Brown, Matthew E. (2003), Fighting Words: Language Policy and Ethnic Relations in Asia (BCSIA Studies in International Security), MIT Press, ISBN 978-0-262-52333-2
- Indrapala, K. (1969). "Early Tamil Settlements in Ceylon". The Journal of the Ceylon Branch of the Royal Asiatic Society of Great Britain & Ireland. 13. JSTOR: 43–63. JSTOR 43483465.
- Jerryson, Michael; Juergensmeyer, Mark (2010), Buddhist Warfare, New York: Oxford University Press, ISBN 978-0-19-539483-2
- Jerryson, Michael K. (2011), Buddhist Fury: Religion and Violence in Southern Thailand, Oxford University Press, ISBN 978-0-19-979324-2
- Kalupahana, David J. (1992), A History of Buddhist Philosophy: Continuities and Discontinuities, University of Hawaii Press, ISBN 978-0-8248-1402-1
- Knaster, Mirka (2010), Living This Life Fully, Shambhala Publications, ISBN 978-0-8348-2254-2
- Markham, Ian S.; Lohr, Christy (2009), A World Religions Reader, John Wiley & Sons, ISBN 978-1-4051-7109-0
- Mishra, Pankaj (2010), An End to Suffering: The Buddha in the World, Macmillan Publishers, ISBN 978-1-4299-3363-6
- Neusner, Jacob; Chilton, Bruce; Tully, R. E. (2013), Just War in Religion and Politics, University Press of America, ISBN 978-0-7618-6094-5
- Reat, Noble Ross (1994), Buddhism: A History, B. Jain, ISBN 978-0-87573-001-1
- Roberts, Adam; Garton Ash, Timothy (2011), Civil Resistance and Power Politics: The Experience of Non-violent Action from Gandhi to the Present, Oxford University Press, ISBN 978-0-19-969145-6
- Skidmore, Monique (2005), Burma At The Turn Of The Twenty-first Century, University of Hawaii Press, ISBN 978-0-8248-2857-8
- Strathern, Alan (2013), "Why are Buddhist monks attacking Muslims?", BBC
- Sumedho, Ajahn (2014), Seeds of Understanding, Amaravati Publications, ISBN 978-1-78432-001-0
- Thera, Narada Maha (2006), The Buddha and His Teachings, Jaico Publishing House, ISBN 978-81-7992-617-8
- Tripāṭhī, Śrīdhara (2008), Encyclopaedia of Pali Literature: The Pali canon, Anmol Publications, ISBN 978-81-261-3560-8
- Zaun, Kathy (2002), Inside Buddhism, Lorenz Educational Press, ISBN 978-1-4291-0985-7
