= W. M. Mendis and Co =

Sri Lankan alcoholic beverages company

W. M. Mendis and Company
- Type: Private
- Industry: Alcoholic beverage
- Founded: 1947; 79 years ago
- Founder: W. M. Mendis
- Headquarters: Welisara, Sri Lanka
- Key people: Arjun Aloysius
- Products: Alcoholic beverages: spirits
- Owner: Perpetual Capital Ltd
- Number of employees: ▼250 to 999
- Website: wmmendis.company

W. M. Mendis and Company, is a Sri Lankan beverage alcohol company, with its headquarters in Negombo, Sri Lanka. It is as known one of Sri Lanka's oldest and most renowned liquor manufacturers in Sri Lanka. Considered as one of the pioneers in the field, it still ranks as one of Sri Lanka's largest distillers.

Mendis produces an array of products, including pure coconut arracks, blended arracks, old arracks and foreign liquors, Several of these spirits are for export markets overseas, including Australia, Germany, India, Malaysia, Maldives, Nepal, Singapore, the United Kingdom, and the United States. The company was formerly listed on the Colombo Stock Exchange.

The company resumed operations in November 2022.

== History ==
=== Change in Ownership ===
In 2011, Arjun Aloysius acquired the controlling stake in Mendis, through Perpetual Capital Ltd, the value was reportedly over Rs. 1 billion.

=== 2018-2021 ===
Mendis lost their license to produce liquor in 2018, due to non-payment of government taxes, and was unable to operate for a long period.

In 2021, Mendis was allowed to restart operations, but almost instantly in a week, the President of Sri Lanka, Gotabaya Rajapaksa, decided to reverse this decision.

=== 2022 ===
On 19 April 2022, the People's Bank acquired Mendis' distillery in Aluthgama, after the company defaulted on its debt repayments. The distillery was valued at over Rs. 250 million.

Resumed Operations - Starting from November 2022, Mendis resumed operations.

== Main brands ==
- Blenders choice whisky
- Island rum
- London spice dry gin
- Mendis coconut arrack
- Rusalka Vodka

== See also ==
- Arrack
