= 2014 anti-Muslim riots in Sri Lanka =

Anti-Muslim Riots in Sri Lanka
- Location: Kalutara District, Sri Lanka
- Date: 15 June 2014- 17 June 2014
- Target: primarily Muslim civilians
- Weapons: Guns, sticks, knives, Molotov cocktails, swords and stones
- Deaths: 4
- Injuries: 80
- Victims: 10,000
- Perpetrator: Sinhala Buddhist nationalist groups: mainly Bodu Bala Sena

The 2014 anti-Muslim riots in Sri Lanka were religious and ethnic riots in June 2014 in south-western Sri Lanka. Muslims and their property were attacked by Sinhalese Buddhists in the towns of Aluthgama, Beruwala and Dharga Town in Kalutara District. At least four people were killed and 80 injured. Hundreds were made homeless following attacks on homes, shops, factories, mosques and a nursery. 10,000 people (8,000 Muslims and 2,000 Sinhalese) were displaced by the riots. The riots followed rallies by Bodu Bala Sena (BBS), a hard line Buddhist group. The BBS was widely blamed for inciting the riots but it has denied responsibility. The mainstream media in Sri Lanka censored news about the riots following orders from the Sri Lankan government.

== Background ==
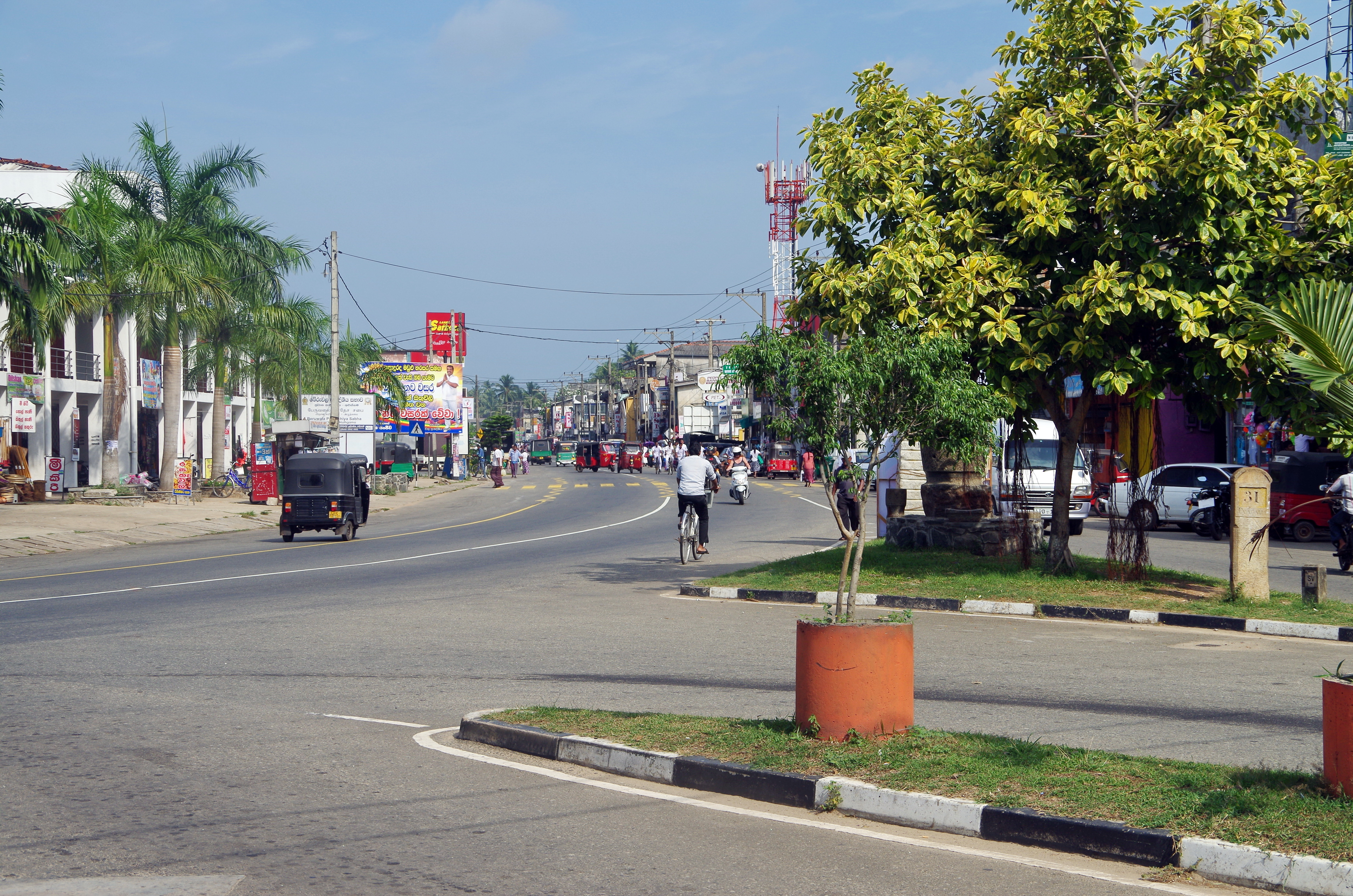
Aluthgama

Since 2012 there have been a number of attacks against Sri Lanka's Muslim minority by the majority Buddhists. The Sinhalese Buddhist nationalist Bodu Bala Sena (BBS) has engaged in various anti-Muslim campaigns.

On Poson Poya (12 June 2014) Buddhist monk Ayagama Samitha and his driver were allegedly assaulted by Muslims in Dharga Town. A mob from Samitha's temple, together with the priest, stormed Aluthgama Police Station demanding that immediate action be taken. Three Muslims were arrested and remanded until 25 June 2014 by the courts. That evening a tense situation arose in Aluthgama as a group of Sinhalese Buddhists started protesting against the alleged assault. The protest turned violent and the mob started throwing stones at the police and attacking Muslim shops. Government ministers Kumara Welgama and Rohitha Abeygunawardena visited the scene to sort out the situation but Welgama's vehicle was stoned by the mob. The police were forced to use tear gas against the protesters. Three people were arrested over the violence.

On 15 June 2014 the BBS staged rallies in Aluthgama, Beruwala and Dharga Town in Kalutara District. Addressing a cheering crowd in Aluthgama, BBS leader Galagoda Aththe Gnanasaara threatened "In this country we still have a Sinhala police; we still have a Sinhala army. After today if a single Marakkalaya [Muslim] or some other paraya [alien] touches a single Sinhalese.....it will be their end."

== Riots ==
After its rally the BBS drove into Dharga Town chanting anti-Muslim slogans. Local residents started throwing stones at the BBS convoy which resulted in violent clashes erupting between the two groups. Eyewitnesses reported Muslim homes and a mosque being stoned. Muslims were pulled off buses and assaulted whilst the Buddhist mob threw Molotov cocktails, burning and looting Muslim shops and homes. Muslim residents were forced to flee from their homes and seek shelter in mosques and community centres. There was rioting in Beruwala as well.

Special Task Force personnel were deployed to control the situation. The police imposed an indefinite curfew in Aluthgama at 6:45pm on 15 June 2014 and at 8:00pm in Beruwala. Despite the curfew BBS supporters wielding weapons were seen in the area. Muslim residents stated that the curfew was only for the Muslims, not for the rioters. According to local residents the police did nothing to help them. Some residents accused the police of helping the BBS.

Three men who were trying to protect Welipitiya mosque in Dharga Town were shot dead in the early hours of 16 June 2014 by a group travelling in a vehicle. The victims were identified as labourer Mohammed Shiraz (30), shop keeper Mohammed Sahuran (40) and tile layer Mohammed Imran (41).

More than 80 people were injured. The injured were taken to several local hospitals. 36 people, including seven who had been shot, were taken to Kalutara Base Hospital while seven others, including a police officer, were taken to Beruwala District Hospital. 10,000 people (8,000 Muslims and 2,000 Sinhalese) displaced by the riots sought shelter in schools, mosques and other community facilities.

The curfew was later extended. By 16 June 2014 no arrests had been made in relation to the violence. After the police failed to restore order, around 50 military personnel were deployed in Aluthgama, Beruwala, Dharga Town, Maggona and Welipenna to maintain order. Local schools were closed on 16 June 2014.

On the night of 16 June 2014 the riots spread to the Welipenna where a mob of 50-60 men armed with guns, Molotov cocktails and knives destroyed 26 shops and nine houses. Karuppan Sivalingam (58), an unarmed Tamil guard, was hacked to death and a Sinhalese farm worker seriously injured when a mob raided a Muslim owned chicken farm in Henagama near Welipenna. The curfew was temporarily lifted at 8.00am on 17 June 2014 before being re-imposed at 12.00pm. By 17 June 2014 10,000 police and Special Task Force personnel had been deployed in the area. According to the police 41 people had been arrested by 17 June 2014. The number of arrested later rose to 49. By 21 June 2014 58 people had been arrested, 36 of whom were remanded whilst the rest were released on police bail.

Journalists covering the riots were also attacked by the mob. Sunday Leader journalist Binoy Suriyaarachchi was held hostage for several hours and his driver Upul was attacked. Sunday Times journalist Sarath Siriwardana was attacked by a mob in Aluthgama on the night of 15 June 2014. An Al Jazeera crew travelling between Mathugama and Aluthgama on 17 June 2014 were attacked by a mob who damaged their vehicle's windscreen.

On 17 June 2014 the police obtained court order preventing the BBS from holding a rally in Mawanella.

The curfew in Aluthgama and Beruwala was lifted at 8.00am on 18 June 2014.

== Aftermath ==
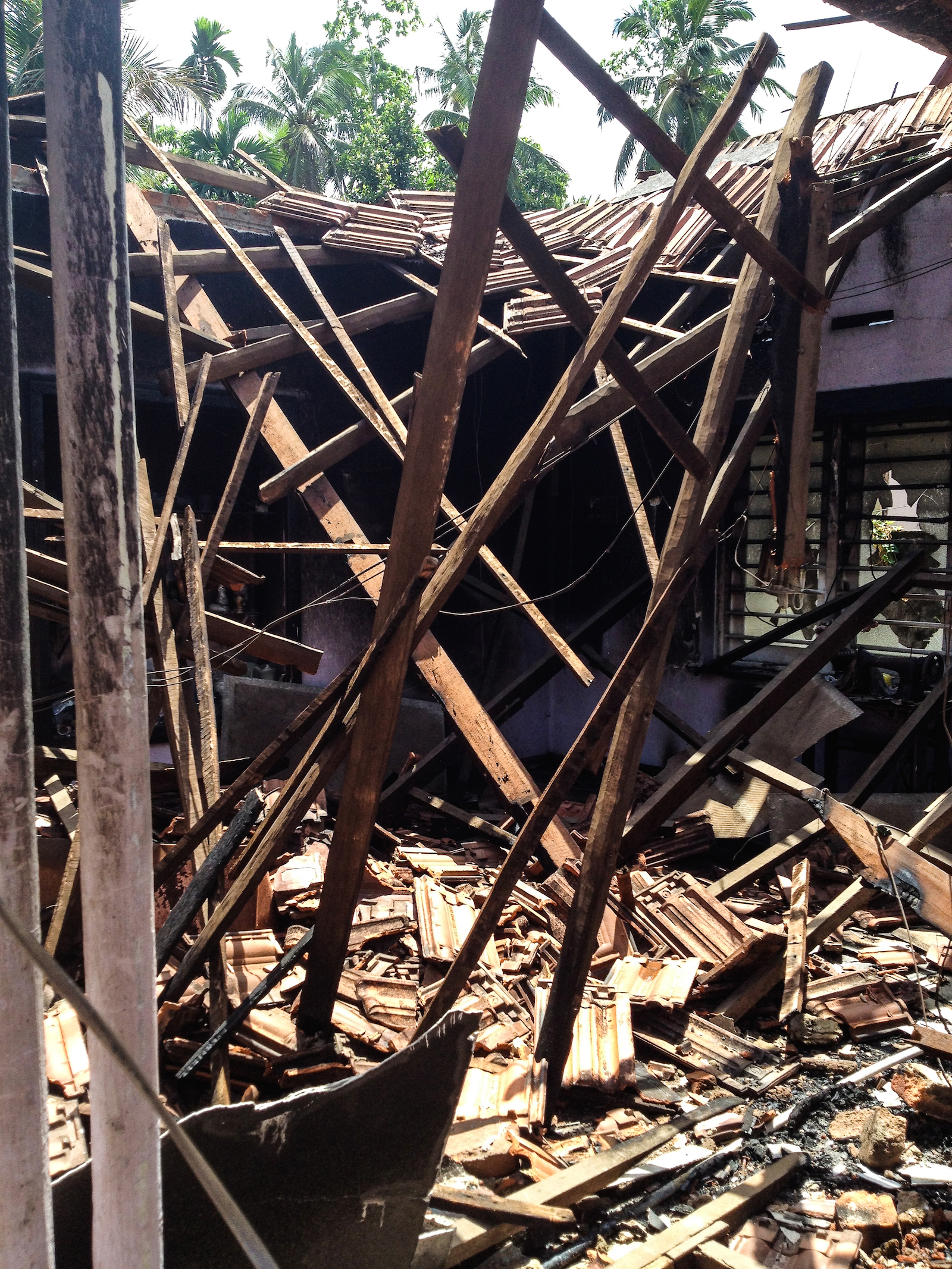
A burnt-out house in Aluthgama

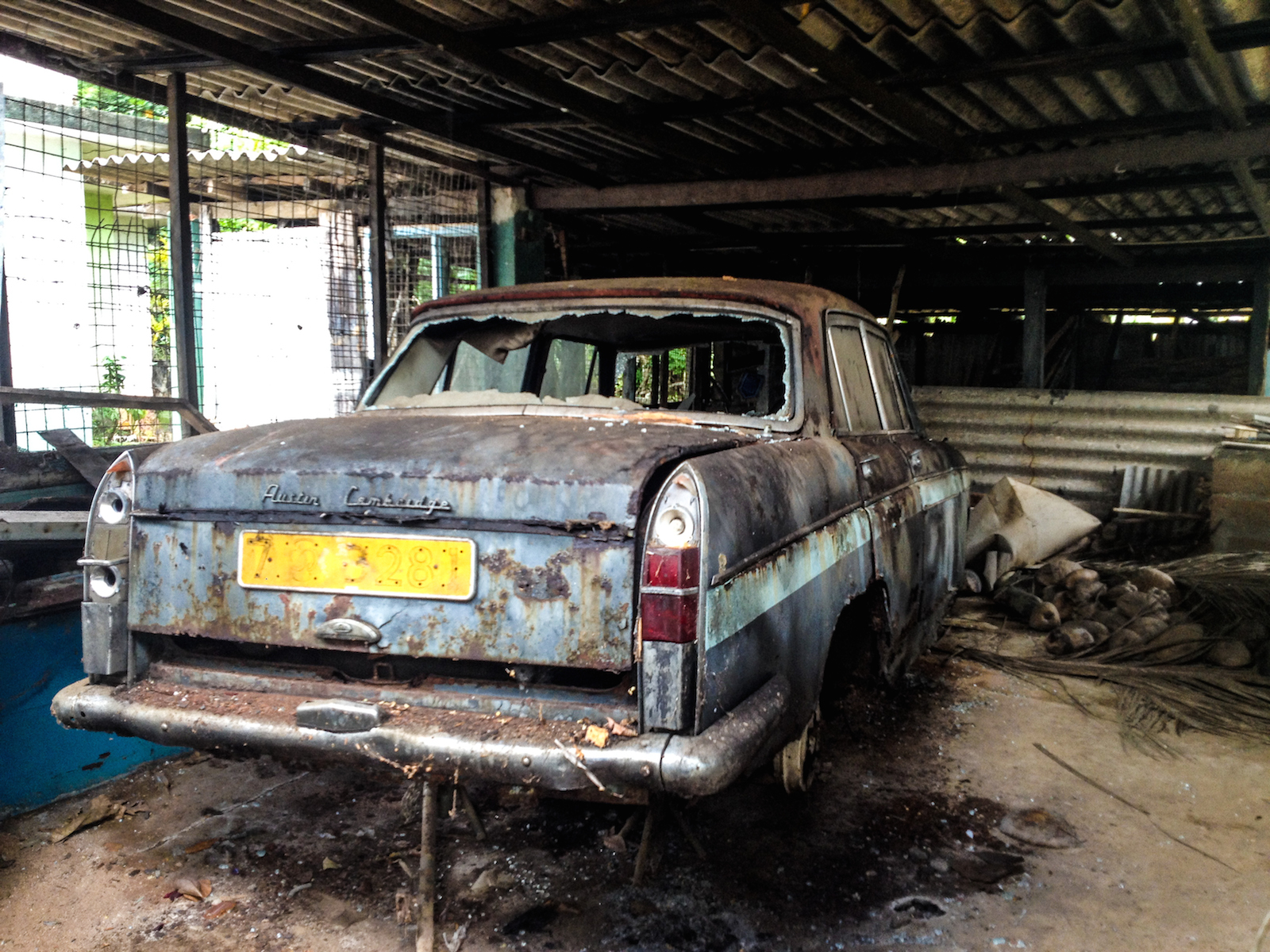
Damaged vehicle in the aftermath of the riots

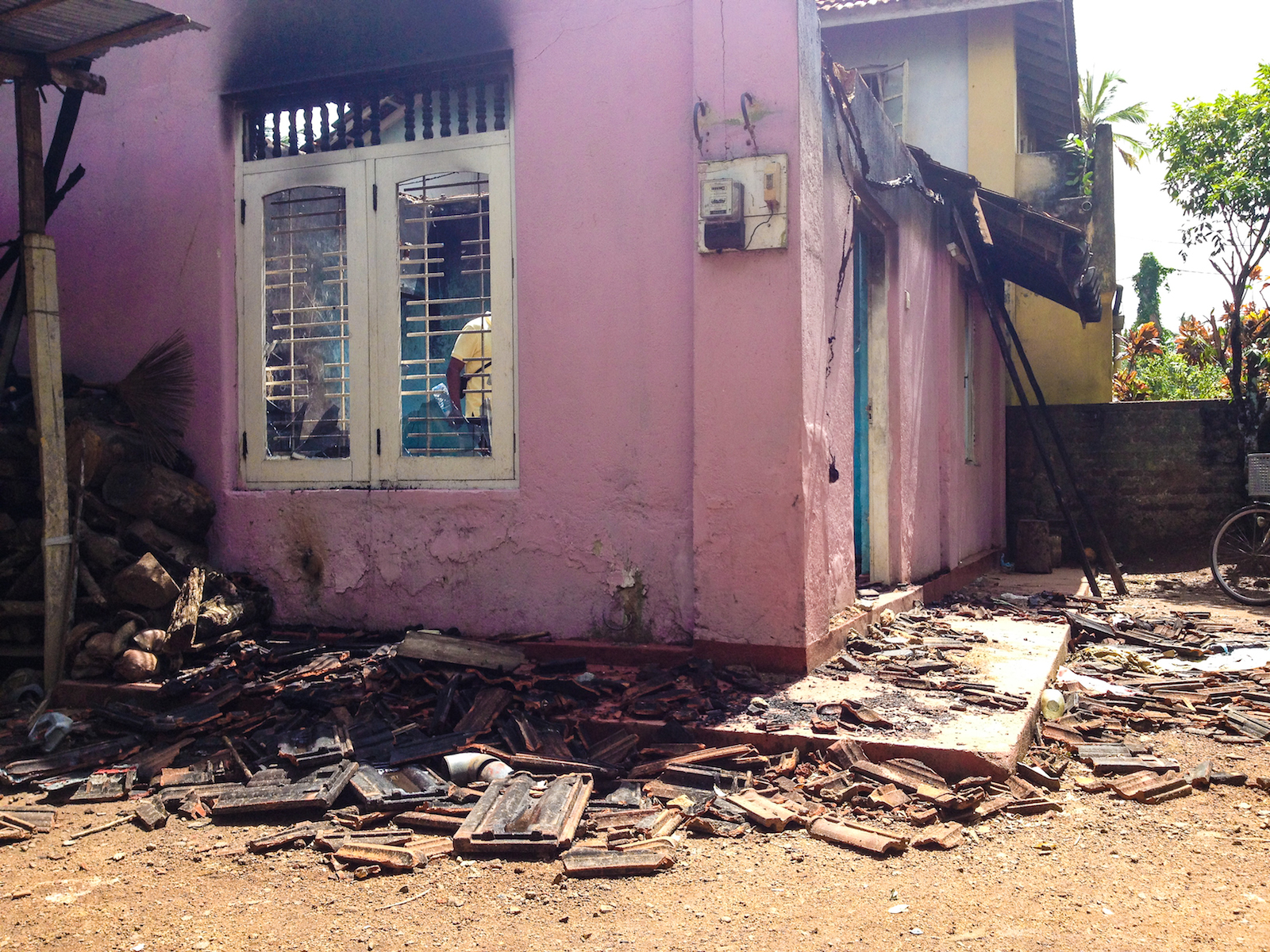
Property damage in Aluthgama

President Mahinda Rajapaksa, accompanied by government minister Mervyn Silva, visited Beruwala on 18 June 2014 to meet victims of the riots and promised an impartial inquiry. According to the president, the government would re-build homes and business destroyed by the riots. The president announced via social media on 21 June 2014 that he would appoint a high-level panel to investigate the riots. At a meeting in Badulla on 21 June 2014 Rajapaksa blamed "international forces" for a "concerted efforts to destabilise the country" and ordered a crackdown on hate groups. Former President Chandrika Kumaratunga and various other parliamentary ministers also condemned the attack.

Moderate Buddhist monk Watareka Vijitha, who had been critical of the BBS, was abducted and assaulted in the Bandaragama area on 19 June 2014. Vijitha had been forcibly circumcised. The police later stated they would take action against Vijitha for giving false statements, saying that his injuries were self-inflicted. Vijitha was later charged by the police for making false allegations. Vijitha had been threatened by BBS leader Galagoda Aththe Gnanasaara in April 2014. He had gone into hiding following attempted assaults.

Muslim businesses in Colombo, Eastern Province and Northern Province staged a hartal on 19 June 2014 as protest against the riots.

Contrary to fears there was no violence after Jumma prayers on 20 June 2014.

The Muslim owned No-Limit clothing store in Panadura was destroyed by fire in the early hours of 21 June 2014, causing Rs.400 million in damage. Witnesses reported seeing petrol bombs being thrown into the store. Police and Special Task Force personnel were deployed in the area.

Schools in the riot affected re-opened on 23 June 2014. Sporadic attacks against Muslim targets continued in the days after the riots.

== Reactions ==
President Rajapaksa, who was in Bolivia for the Group of 77 summit, issued statements via social media urging restraint and promising an investigation. The government then urged the media not to publish news about the riots which could cause "disharmony" amongst religious groups in the country. As a result, there was a virtual blackout about the violence in the mainstream media in Sri Lanka.

Rajapaksa's United People’s Freedom Alliance (UPFA) government was divided over the riots. Rauff Hakeem, Minister of Justice and leader of the Sri Lanka Muslim Congress, has called for "an independent and transparent inquiry" into the riots which would bring to justice not just those responsible for the violence but also those allowed or encouraged religious zealotry. Risad Badhiutheen, Minister of Industry and Commerce and leader of the All Ceylon Muslim Congress, accused the BBS of instigating racial tensions and called upon the government to ban the BBS and take legal action against its leader Gnanasara. Vasudeva Nanayakkara, Minister of National Languages and Social Integration and leader of the Democratic Left Front has called for BBS leader Gnanasaara and other BBS members to be arrested for instigating racial tensions which led to the riots. However, Champika Ranawaka, Minister of Technology, Research and Atomic Energy and leading member of the Jathika Hela Urumaya, blamed the violence on Muslim extremists and accused the United States of nurturing a Taliban in Sri Lanka. Rajapaksa has criticised ministers who were critical of the government's and police's response. At the 26 regular session of the United Nations Human Rights Council on 20 June 2014 the Sri Lankan government blamed Muslims for the riots.

The BBS has denied responsibility for the riots, saying it did not organise the rally in Aluthgama on 15 June 2014.

The main opposition United National Party (UNP) condemned the riots and blamed the governing United People’s Freedom Alliance for instigating the violence. UNP MP Mangala Samaraweera, a vocal critic of the Rajapaksa government, went as far as to name three senior military intelligence officers - General (retd) Kapila Hendawitharana (defence ministry advisor), Colonel Suresh Salley and Deputy Inspector General Chandra Wakishta (deputy chief of the State Intelligence Service) - whom he accused of instigating the violence. The violence was also condemned by religious leaders and civil society groups.

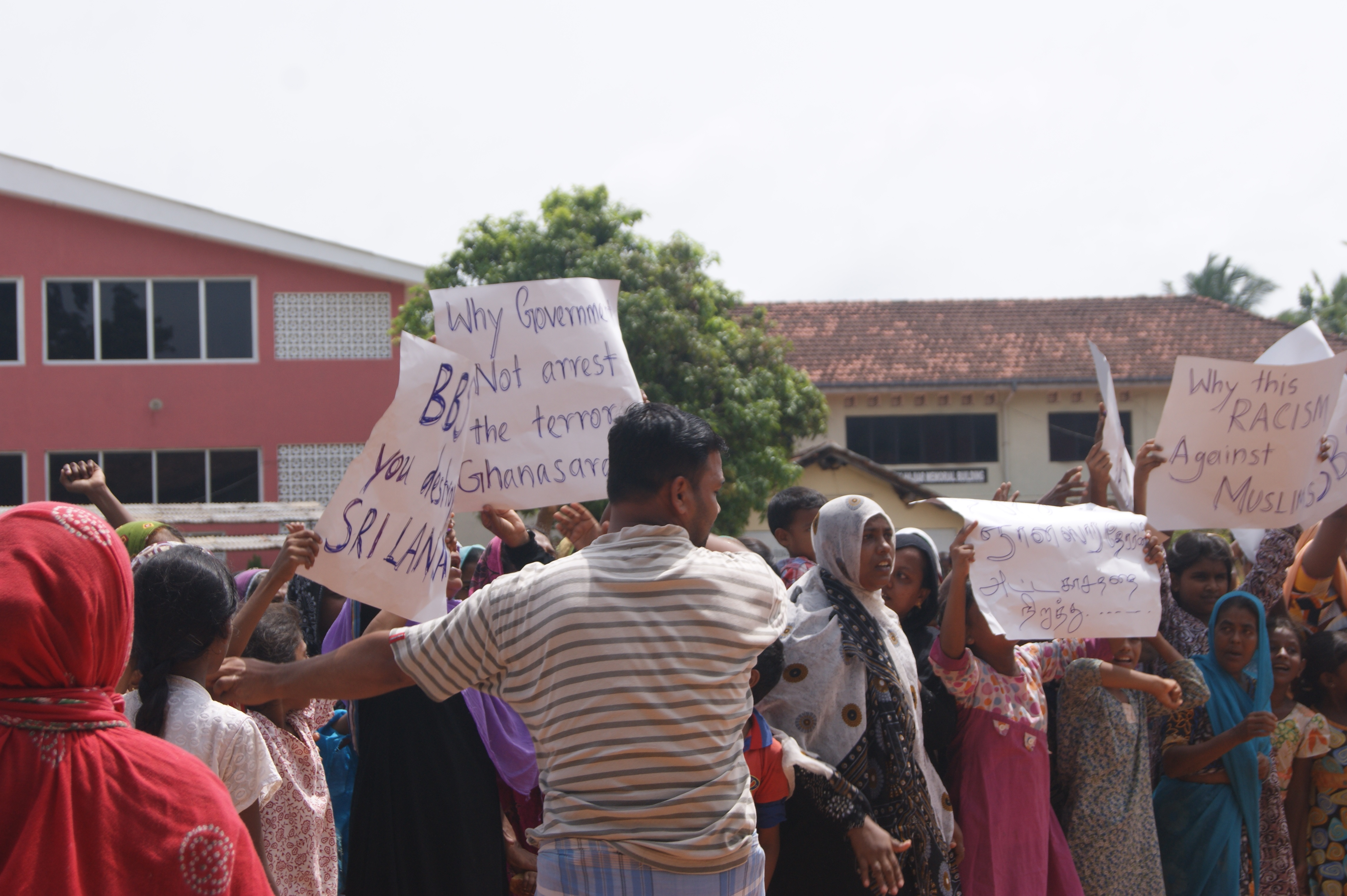
Protesters hold placards as they demonstrate against the anti-Muslim violence, 17 June 2014

UN Secretary General Ban Ki-moon expressed concern at the communal violence and urged the government to ensure the safety of all Sri Lankans. UN High Commissioner for Human Rights Navi Pillay issued a statement on 16 June 2014 expressing alarm at the riots and urging the government to halt the violence and hate speech and bring the perpetrators to book. The European Union delegation in Colombo, with the support of the Norwegian, Swiss and Turkish embassies, issued a statement on 20 June 2014 condemning the violence and urging the government to uphold the rule of law. Organisation of Islamic Co-operation Secretary General Iyad bin Amin Madani expressed serious concern at the violence against Muslims and observed a rising trend of violence by extremists.

The US embassy in Colombo also a statement on 16 June 2014 condemning the violence and urging the government to restore order and bring the perpetrators to justice. The following day United States Department of State spokesperson Jen Psaki stated that the US condemned the violence and blamed it on recent "inflammatory rhetoric". Canada's Ambassador for Religious Freedom Andrew P. W. Bennett issued a statement on 16 June 2014 condemning the communal violence against Muslims and calling for a swift and transparent investigation into the violence.

Amnesty International urged the government to take action to end the violence immediately, rein in groups targeting religious minorities, protect Muslims and bring to account those responsible for the violence. Human Rights Watch has urged the government to urgently investigate the violence, and identify and investigative those responsible for the attacks on Muslims.

The riots took place in a popular tourist area which prompted some foreign governments to issue travel advisories to their citizens.
