= Galabawa =

Coordinates: 7°24′N 80°28′E

- Village
- Interactive map of Galabawa
- Country: Sri Lanka
- Province: Central Province
- Time zone: UTC+5:30 (Sri Lanka Standard Time)
- Area code: 60062

Galabawa is a village in Sri Lanka. It is located in Central Province, at the west border of Central Province near the border of North Western Province. It is postal to Kahapathwala. It is situated in Daladagamwala Galagedara road. Its history makes back to BC where the King Walagamba once resided here before he became the king of Sri Lanka.

Its population is about 1000, most of whom are Sinhala Buddhists.

The main access road to Galabawa is via Kandy Kurunegala route and 1 km from the Hatharaliyadda Road. It has another access road via Galagedara.

== See also ==
- List of towns in Central Province, Sri Lanka
