= Bodu Bala Sena =

Buddhist extremist organization in Sri Lanka

- බොදු බල සේනා
- Abbreviation: BBS
- Formation: 2012
- Founder: Galagoda Aththe Gnanasara
- Type: Sinhalese Buddhist nationalist
- Legal status: Active
- Purpose: Opposition to privileges of minority religions Far-right politics
- Headquarters: 32, Sri Sambuddhathva Jayanthi Mawatha, Colombo, Sri Lanka
- Coordinates: 6°53′46″N 79°51′36″E
- Secretary-General: Galagoda Aththe Gnanasara
- Chief Executive Officer: Dilanthe Withanage
- Affiliations: Sinha-Le: Sinhala Ravaya; Bodu Bala Sena; Ravana Balaya; Our People's Power Party (former political wing)
- Website: bodubalasena.org

Bodu Bala Sena, (Sinhala: බොදු බල සේනා, lit. 'Buddhist Power Army') also abbreviated as BBS is a far-right ultranationalist Sinhalese Buddhist organization, and a break-away faction from the right-wing nationalist Jathika Hela Urumaya party. The BBS generally opposes pluralist and democratic ideologies, and criticizes moderate Buddhists for their alleged inaction against the rise of other religions in Sri Lanka.

== History ==
=== Foundation ===
The BBS was founded by monks Kirama Wimalajothi and Galagoda Aththe Gnanasaara after they broke away from Jathika Hela Urumaya (JHU). Gnanasara had been one of the JHU candidates in Colombo District at the 2004 parliamentary election. One of the earliest campaigns by BBS was in respect of Buddhist Sri Lankans working in the Middle East who, according to BBS, were prevented from practising their religion and punished harshly if found to be doing so.

The BBS held its first national convention at the Bandaranaike Memorial International Conference Hall on 28 July 2012. The convention passed five resolutions which, amongst other things, called for a ban on vasectomy and tubal ligation in government health facilities, replacement of the various legal systems used in the country with a single legal system, preferential treatment in university admission for students who attended Buddhism classes, use of monks in government schools to teach history and other classes, and the avoidance of any race- or religion-based solution for the country's ethnic problems.

The BBS held a protest at the Bangladeshi High Commission in Colombo on 4 October 2012 against the anti-Buddhist riots in Bangladesh. Some of the protesters threw stones and bottles at the High Commission.

On 14 October 2012 BBS stormed a house in Batakettara, Homagama, Piliyandala where it alleges a Christian pastor called Dinesh and others from an evangelical group called The Name of Lord Jesus were trying to convert Sinhalese Buddhists. The pastor was later released, but seven people were arrested on charges of abduction after complaints were made by the pastor's family. The following day BBS held a protest outside Piliyandala Police Station demanding that the seven arrested be released.

The BBS held a protest rally in Badulla on 25 October 2012 against alleged conversion, vandalism of Buddhist sites and Islamic terrorism. They held a protest at the Department of Archeology on 29 November 2012 urging the authorities to protect archaeological sites in the Eastern Province.

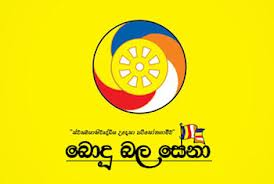
Alternative flag used by BBS

The BBS stormed Sri Lanka Law College in Hultsdorf, Colombo on 7 January 2013, alleging that exam results were being distorted in favour of Muslim students. The allegations were not true but the college was forced to delay new student registration by one week in order to investigate the allegations.

The BBS stormed the Cinnamon Bay Hotel in Moragalla, Beruwala on 21 January 2013, alleging that the premises contained a "Buddha bar" (associating sacred symbols with such places as bars is considered sacrilege). Two hotel managers were arrested by the police for organising the "Buddha bar" event.

President Mahinda Rajapaksa and government ministers met with the BBS on 27 January 2013 at Temple Trees, Colombo. After the meeting the President issued a statement which urged the BBS and other monks to avoid conflicts with other religious communities but this statement was only issued in English, not Sinhala which is the language of most BBS supporters.

The opposition United National Party met with the BBS on 12 February 2013.

The BBS organised a meeting in Maharagama, Colombo on 17 February 2013 which was attended by around 16,000 people including 1,300 monks. At the rally the BBS general secretary Galagoda Aththe Gnanasara stated "This is a government created by Sinhala Buddhists and it must remain Sinhala Buddhist. This is a Sinhala country, Sinhala government. Democratic and pluralistic values are killing the Sinhala race". He also told the crowd at the rally that they "must become an unofficial civilian police force against Muslim extremism. These so-called democrats are destroying the Sinhala race". At the rally the BBS unveiled the "Maharagama Declaration", a ten-point resolution which, other than an end to halal certification, called for a ban on Sri Lankan women going to work in the Middle East; end of mosque building financed by the Middle East; and ban some contraceptives.

In February 2013 former BBS leader Kirama Wimalajothi called for a ban on burqas in the country. The BBS has also campaigned against the abaya.

The BBS met Lieutenant General Jagath Jayasuriya, Major General Shavendra Silva and others from the Sri Lanka Army in late February 2013 to discuss extremist Muslim groups that the BBS alleged were operating in the country. BBS also met with IGP N. K. Illangakoon from the police on 1 March 2013 to discuss the same issues.

Meth Sevana, the BBS's cultural and training centre in Pilana, Wanchawala, Galle District, was officially opened on 9 March 2013 by chief guest Defence Secretary Gotabhaya Rajapaksa, brother of President Mahinda Rajapaksa.

The BBS held a rally in Kandy on 17 March 2013 at which it announced that it would work to remove a 10th-century mosque at the Kuragala Buddhist monastery complex in Ratnapura District. At the rally BBS alleged that Muslim fundamentalists had taken over the site and destroyed Buddhist heritage. BBS general secretary Galagoda Aththe Gnanasara accused the Muslim owned Fashion Bug and No Limit retail chains of converting its Buddhist Sinhalese employees to Islam.

The BBS held a rally in Panadura on 24 March 2013 at which it called on the country to rally against Christian and Muslim extremists, insisting Sri Lanka was a Sinhala Buddhist country, not a multiracial or multi-religious country. At the rally BBS called for High Commissioner Ferial Ashraff to be recalled from Singapore for allegedly carrying out anti-Sinhala activities. At the rally BBS announced that a ringtone could be downloaded from Mobitel, the state-owned mobile phone operator, which would raise funds for BBS. This caused protests from Mobitel customers and the company was forced to apologise for causing "emotional distress".

A nationwide protest by Muslims against the BBS and JHU was held on 25 March 2013. The protests were organised by the Muslim Rights Organization (MRO). A hartal was observed in the Eastern Province on the same day against the BBS's anti-Muslim stance.

The Muslim owned Fashion Bug clothes shop in Pepiliyana, Colombo District was attacked on 28 March 2013 by a mob led by Buddhist monks. Some reports suggested that BBS was behind the attack. BBS denied any involvement and condemned the attack.

On 31 March 2013 it was reported that the government was going to ban a number of groups including the BBS. Reacting to the reports, BBS general secretary Galagoda Aththe Gnanasara described Minister of National Languages and Social Integration Vasudeva Nanayakkara as a disgrace and a peacenik, saying "Such ministers should be sent to Angoda once in three months, to have their heads examined". Nanayakkara denied the reports, saying that the government was not going to ban extremist groups like the BBS, it was only considering banning hate speech.

In April 2013 a group of BBS members led by general secretary Galagoda Aththe Gnanasara visited the US to raise awareness of the organisation and counter its negative image.

In August 2014 Gnanasara Thera criticised the Government for allowing the Sri Lanka Thowheed Jamath (SLTJ) to carry out protests against Israel due to the ongoing Gaza war. The Thera noted that Israel supplied a range of armaments, including Kfir jets, Dvora and Shaldag class fast attack craft, Unmanned Aerial Vehicles, anti-missile systems for Mi-24 helicopter gunships as well as combat training.

In 2014, Gnanasara Thera and the BBS signed a pact with Myanmar's Ashin Wirathu and the 969 Movement to build a Buddhist Alliance in order to protect the Buddha Sasana. They also invited all "peace loving people" from other religions, including Muslims and Christians. However Wirathu and the 696 Movement is accused of being key figures in Myanmar's anti-Muslim riots and massacres. The President of the Hindu Federation N. Arunakanth was also present and stated that they were in discussions with several Indian Hindu organisations as well.

In 2019, Gnanasara Thera and the BBS joined the islandwide protests by various organisations and religious leaders led by the fasting protest of Athuraliye Rathana Thera against Muslim minister Rishad Bathiudeen and governors Azath Salley and M. L. A. M Hizbullah over their alleged ties to Islamists, demanding their resignations . On the same day All of Sri Lanka's Muslim ministers and their deputies resigned from their portfolios for a month and asked the allegations to be proven within that time. Until they return their ministries would be handled by the PM. However Gnanasara later criticised Rathana Thera for taking issues into his own hands which according to him swept the "main issues" under the carpet. He also noted that the protest should have been held earlier in the immediate aftermath of the 2019 Easter Bombings and doing it now could push the traditional Muslims into extremism.

== Organization ==
Galagoda Aththe Gnanasara and Dilanthe Withanage are the General Secretary and Chief Executive Officer of BBS respectively. Its headquarters are located at Sri Sambuddha Jayanthi Mandira in Colombo. Sri Sambuddha Jayanthi Mandira is owned by the Buddhist Cultural Centre, an organisation also founded by former leader Kirama Wimalajothi. The Buddhist Cultural Centre was opened by President Mahinda Rajapaksa on 15 May 2011.

=== Affiliations and ideology ===
The BBS alongside Ravana Balaya, Sinhala Ravaya and Mahasohon Balakaya are among a new wave of organisations in Sri Lanka that push a "new brand" of Nationalism with a greater emphasis of religion with more militant tendencies to protect the motherland. The Bodu Bala Sena claims to operate alongside the Sinhala Rawaya and the Ravana Balaya in the far-right campaign Sinha Le, which opposes the LGBTQ+ community, Islam, and Tamil Eelam. The organisation attracts support from "hot blooded" Monks and lower middle class youth.

== Halal certification issue ==
ACJU halal logo

In February 2013 the BBS started a campaign against the halal certifying system in the country. In Sri Lanka, halal certification is carried out by the All Ceylon Jamiyyathul Ulama (ACJU), the group of Islamic clerics, to Sri Lanka. Certificates are only issued to businesses that request it, and the certificate is issued for a fee where the contributions are used by the ACJU to fund Islamic religious activities. The BBS initially threatened to take the ACJU to court. Later they threatened to launch a campaign of agitation against halal certification, stating "they [the Muslims] are trying to impose their ritualistic food products upon this country. The next plan is to bring about Sharia law. Already there is Muslim banking system in the country." At the rally in Maharagama on 17 February 2013 the BBS announced that it was calling for the abolition of the halal certifying system, demanding that shops be cleared of halal meat by April.

In late February 2013 the ACJU offered to hand over responsibility for halal certifying to the government but this was rejected by the BBS who called for the complete eradication halal certification in the country. The BBS slammed the ACJU as "arrogant, corrupt, thieving, underworld thugs". The government also refused to take over halal certification due to the pressure exerted by the BBS.

The BBS stormed a meat inspection facility in Dematagoda run by Colombo Municipal Council (CMC) on 1 March 2013, alleging that young calves, pregnant cows and water buffaloes were being slaughtered at the premises. The slaughter of calves is illegal in Colombo. The BBS were incorrect – the premises were being used by CMC officials to inspect meat prior to being distributed around the city.

Meetings were held between the ACJU, the Ceylon Chamber of Commerce (CCC) and Buddhist clergy and a compromise was announced on 11 March 2013. The ACJU would stop adding the halal logo on products for local consumption but continue to use them for products being exported to Islamic countries where it is compulsory. This offer was also rejected on 12 March 2013 by the BBS who continued to demand "the eradication of the entire Halal process". The BBS went on to attack those responsible for the compromise. They accused Milinda Moragoda, a government minister, of "creating an unholy inter-religious alliance, and attempting to destroy our learned monks. These revered bhikkus are now in the grasp of infidels". They branded the Buddhist clergy as "pseudo Buddhist leaders who never stood against Muslim extremism and Christian fundamentalism." They accused the CCC chairman Susantha Ratnayake of having a "Buddha bar" at a hotel he runs.

The government pronounced on 13 March 2013 that the ACJU had no power to issue halal certificates and that a new way to certify halal products would need to be formulated. On 17 March 2013 the BBS declared victory in its battle against halal, saying it would not talk about halal in the future.

== 2014 anti-Muslim riots ==
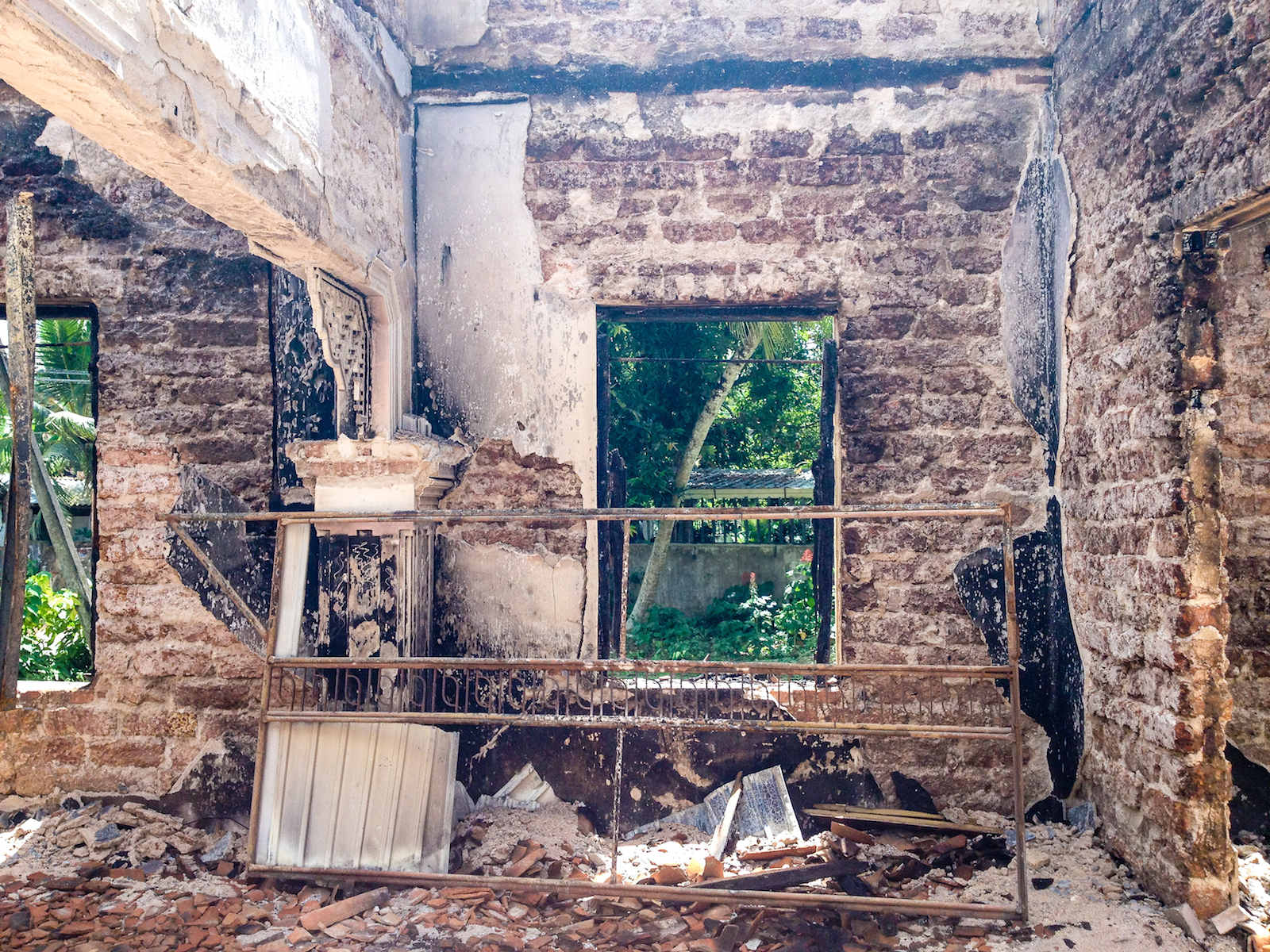
A house destroyed during the riots by the attackers

On Poson Poya (12 June 2014) Buddhist monk Ayagama Samitha and his driver were allegedly assaulted by Muslims in Dharga Town. A mob from Samitha's temple, together with the priest, stormed Aluthgama Police Station demanding that immediate action be taken. Three Muslims were arrested and remanded until 25 June 2014 by the courts. That evening a tense situation arose in Aluthgama as a group of Sinhalese Buddhists started protesting against the alleged assault. The protest turned violent and the mob started throwing stones at the police and attacking Muslim shops. Three people were arrested over the violence.

On 15 June 2014 the BBS staged rallies in Aluthgama, Beruwala and Dharga Town in Kalutara District. Addressing a cheering crowd in Aluthgama, BBS leader Galagoda Aththe Gnanasaara threatened "In this country we still have a "Sinhala police"; we still have a "Sinhala army". After today if a single Marakkalaya [Muslim, in context used derogatorily] or some other paraya [alien, outcast, also a derogatory term] touches a single Sinhalese…..it will be their end."

After its rally the BBS drove into Dharga Town chanting anti-Muslim slogans. Reportedly local Muslim residents started throwing stones at the BBS convoy which resulted in violent clashes erupting between the two groups. Eyewitnesses reported Muslim homes and a mosque being stoned. Muslims were pulled off buses and assaulted whilst the Buddhist mob threw Molotov cocktails, burning and looting Muslim shops and homes. Muslim residents were forced to flee from their homes and seek shelter in mosques and community centres. There was rioting in Beruwala as well. At least four people were killed and 80 injured. Hundreds were made homeless following attacks on homes, shops, factories, mosques and a nursery. 10,000 people (8,000 Muslims and 2,000 Sinhalese) were displaced by the riots. The BBS was widely blamed for inciting the riots but it has denied responsibility.

== Attacks on media ==
The BBS general secretary Galagoda Aththe Gnanasara has accused the majority of the English language media in the country of "working on foreign agendas" and of being traitors to the Sinhala Buddhist cause.

A BBC News crew filming the BBS rally at Maharagama on 17 February 2013 were surrounded by a mob of twenty young men who threatened them and verbally abused a Sri Lankan member of the crew, accusing him of being a "traitor", having "foreign parents" and working for a "foreign conspirator" who was "against Sri Lanka". The police seemed to be helping the crew by barricading the crew and ordering them not to leave. The mob threatened it would "be the end" of the crew if they returned to Maharagama. A reporter from the Muslim newspaper Navamini was also harassed at the rally by a mob who handed him over to the police who in turn detained the reporter for 4 1/2 hours.

== Criticism and controversies ==
The BBS has received criticism from politicians, human rights groups, other Buddhist clergy and Muslims from Sri Lanka and abroad.

Bodu Bala Sena has drawn criticism from notable representatives of every political party which represent the Sri Lankan parliament except the Jathika Hela Urumaya, for its ideology and actions. Some believe BBS is a front group for Western countries who wish to divide the Sri Lankan population in order to serve Western interests. For example, Wimal Weerawansa, a Sri Lankan government minister, has asked that BBS challenge "the Norway agent in its organization" in response to BBS's challenge to him to prove BBS has received funds from a Norwegian NGO.

Minister of National Languages and Social Integration Vasudeva Nanayakkara has described BBS as "an extremist group that comes up with provoking statements". Opposition MP and former Foreign Minister Mangala Samaraweera has accused the BBS of being "a representation of 'Taliban terrorism'" and of spreading extremism and communal hatred against Muslims. Samaraweera has also alleged that the BBS is secretly funded by the Ministry of Defence. The BBS demanded a public apology for Samaraweera's comments, calling him bankrupt and accusing him of supporting separatists. Former ambassador Dayan Jayatilleka has described the BBS as an "ethno-religious fascist movement from the dark underside of Sinhala society". Vikramabahu Karunaratne, leader of the Nava Sama Samaja Party, has labelled the BBS as an extremist religious group.

The International Crisis Group has stated that the BBS's attacks on the Muslim community will lead to an increase in Islamic fundamentalism in the country. The Islamic Human Rights Commission has accused the BBS of "spreading religious hatred" and urged the Sri Lankan government to take legal action against organisations which attack minority groups. The Asian Human Rights Commission has described the BBS as an "expression of the widespread lawlessness in the country", claiming that the government's failure to take action against groups such as the BBS demonstrated the government's connivance. Minority Rights Group International has accused BBS of being the main group behind the recent spate of attacks against Muslims in the country. In its 2012 human rights report, the British Foreign and Commonwealth Office accused BBS of increasing "campaigns against religious minorities".

The views of the BBS have been disowned by some of the mainstream Buddhist clergy. Anunayake Bellanwila Wimalaratana has stated that "The views of the Bodu Bala Sena are not the views of the entire Sangha community".

Opposition provincial councillor and MRO president Mujeebur Rahuman has stated that the unfettered activities of the BBS will mean an "ethnic riot will start between Sinhalese and Muslims". The Eastern Provincial Council passed a motion unanimously on 20 February 2013 censuring the BBS for its anti-Muslim stance. Kalmunai Municipal Council passed a motion on 4 April 2013 against extremist groups including the BBS, urging crackdown on these groups.

A group calling itself "Buddhists Questioning Bodu Bala Sena" staged a peaceful candle-lit vigil on 12 April 2013 outside the BBS's headquarters at Sri Sambuddha Jayanthi Mandira. The vigil was broken up by the police.

In July 2014, Galagoda Aththe Gnanasara, the secretary general of the group, demanded that Pope Francis apologize to the Buddhists of Sri Lanka for various "atrocities committed by Christian colonial governments in South Asia" after it was announced that he would visit Sri Lanka in January 2015. After Gnanasara made this demand, a group of Buddhists stormed a meeting at Centre for Society and Religion in Colombo. In doing so they disrupted a meeting over the search for people missing from the civil war and began hurling insults and threats to destroy the center. On 22 July 2014, Gnanasara denounced the 14th Dalai Lama after he called for the Buddhist monks in Myanmar and Sri Lanka to end violence towards Muslims in their countries. He asserted that they did not recognize the Dalai Lama as the leader of Buddhists worldwide and stated that the Dalai Lama was being fed false information from Muslim extremists.

Bodu Bala Sena was accused and criticised by the critics and other political leaders for aggravating the violence between Muslims and Buddhists in the country which troubled the entire nation in recent times including the 2018 anti-Muslim riots in Sri Lanka in Kandy.

== See also ==
- 969 Movement
- Patriotic Association of Myanmar
- Buddhism and violence
