= Sinhala Ravaya =

Political party in Sri Lanka

Sinhala Ravaya සිංහල රාවය
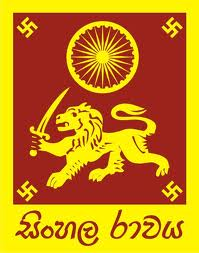
- President: Rev. Akmeemana Dayarathana Thero
- General Secretary: Shalika Lakpriya Perera
- Publicity Secretary: මධුභාෂණ ප්‍රභාත් රණහංස, Madhubhashana Prabhat Ranahamsa
- Ideology: Sinhalese Buddhist nationalism; Anti-liberalism; Ultranationalism
- Political position: Far-right
- Religion: Theravada Buddhism
- National affiliation: Sinha-Le: Bodu Bala Sena; Sinhala Ravaya; Ravana Balaya
- Staff: 200
- Volunteers: 4500

Election symbol
- Diamond

Website
- sinhalaraavaya.com

Sinhala Ravaya (Sinhala: සිංහල රාවය, transl. Sound of Sinhalese) is a far-right, ultranationalist Sinhalese Buddhist political party, which in alliance with the Bodu Bala Sena leads the nationalist campaign of Sinha-Le in Sri Lanka. Shalika Luckpriya Perera serves as the general secretary of the party.
