= Ravana Balaya =

- Leader: Ven. Ittekande Thera
- Ideology: Sinhalese Buddhist nationalism Ravanism
- Religion: Buddhism
- Slogan: We are the ones who oppose who oppose the country!

The Ravana Balaya (transl. Force of Ravana) is a Sinhalese Buddhist nationalist organization in Sri Lanka, which follows the mythological King Ravana. It is led by Ittekande Sandhatissa.

== History ==
The Ravana Balaya gained notoriety for its attacks on Jehova's Witnesses and other Christians. It was believed that then president, Mahinda Rajapaksha on behalf of the Sri Lanka Freedom Party (SLPF), extended his support to the organisation; additionally received support from the police forces in its campaigns to suppress minority religions.

== Organization ==
The Ravana Balaya is named after the ten headed Rakshasha King Ravana, who in the epic Ramayana is said to have fought against the god Rama and monkey god Hanuman. This Shaivite Hindu Ravana myth emerged among Sinhalese after the 13th Century Dravidian migrations to coastal regions. These migrations gave rise to Karava, Durava and Salagama who were originally mostly Shaivites and praised Ravana. As they became Buddhist later they kept their Shaivite Dravidian origin Ravana worship practice. This practice was not present among the original Sinhala populations which consisted mostly of Govigama peoples.

The Ravana Balaya along with the Bodu Bala Sena and Sinhala Rawaya are members of the far-right campaign Sinha Le. These organisations have been described as "fascist" by political commentators. Several human rights organisations have criticized Mahinda Rajapaksha for supporting the groups.
