= Galagoda Aththe Gnanasara =

Sri Lankan Buddhist monk

Ven. Galagoda Aththe Gnanasara Thera
- ගලගොඩ අත්තේ ඥාණසාර හිමි

Personal life
- Born: Galagodaaththa, Galle District, Sri Lanka
- Notable work: Bodu Bala Sena

Religious life
- Religion: Buddhism

Galagoda Aththe Gnanasara Thera (Sinhala: ගලගොඩ අත්තේ ඥාණසාර හිමි) is a Sri Lankan Buddhist monk and the Secretary General of the Bodu Bala Sena, a far-right Sinhalese Buddhist nationalist organisation. He is a controversial figure in Sri Lanka and is well-known for his brash behavior, various run-ins with the law, and ultranationalistic rhetoric.

Gnanasara Thera has been involved in a number of legal issues. In 2000, he was fined after pleading guilty for drunk driving after a hit-and-run which injured two people, 2018 he was sentenced to six years' rigorous imprisonment for contempt of court and in 2025 he was sentenced to nine months imprisonment for inciting religious hatred.

== Early life ==
Gnanasara Thera was born in Galagodaaththa, a village located in the Galle District of southern Sri Lanka.

According to Gnanasara Thera himself, he came from a family of modest means, and grew up alongside several siblings. Gnanasara Thera claims that he began living a monastic life in Sri Lanka's tropical forests, living in cave-like dwellings, and imposing a harsh disciplinary routine on himself. However, an article published by The Guardian in 2025 investigated Gnanasara Thera's claims and reported that "anyone familiar with the man" disputed such an origin story, and that he was actually a "small-time thug who had donned the robes to avoid prison time."

== Career ==
During the mid-2000s, Gnanasara Thera joined the Sinhalese Buddhist nationalist Jathika Hela Urumaya, the world’s first political party formed entirely of Buddhist monks. He stood for a parliamentary seat in the 2004 elections, but was not elected. Gnanasara Thera subsequently formed a close relationship with the Rajapaksa family, a prominent political dynasty in the country.

Gnanasara Thera co-founded the Sinhalese Buddhist nationalist Bodu Bala Sena (BBS) in 2012, which quickly rose to prominence due to his speeches at their rallies. At one speech, Gnanasara Thera stated that "this country still has a Sinhala police, a Sinhala army. After today if a single [Muslim] or some other [minority] touches a Sinhalese... it will be their end."

In June 2014, Gnanasara Thera led a rally in the town of Aluthgama, following an argument between a local Buddhist monk and a group of Muslim youths. Addressing a crowd of about 7,000 people, he declared that "enough is enough" and urged attendees to "fight" Sri Lanka's minorities. Hours later, anti-Muslim riots broke out in the town, with Sinhalese rioters beating local Muslims, looting Muslim-owned shops, and burning the homes of local Muslims. When contacted by CNN that night, Gnanasara Thera said he was unavailable to comment, but another official from the BBS said Gnanasara Thera "spoke in strong words. He blessed the people after chanting verses. He preached to them to conduct themselves peacefully".

In June 2017, the Police Organised Crimes Prevention Division arrested Gnanasara Thera on allegations of obstructing a police officer in Welikada, following a multi-week manhunt. He was arrested after appearing at a police station to give a statement, and later released on bail.

In February 2018, Gnanasara Thera appeared in the town of Digana, following a murder perpetrated by a group of Muslim men against a Sinhalese Buddhist truck driver. Hours later, riots broke out in the town, and rioters destroyed hundreds of homes and shops, dozens of vehicles, and nearly two dozen mosques. Two Hindu temples were also damaged. While the government subsequently arrested over 100 people, Gnanasara Thera was never approached by the police.

== Legal issues ==
In 2000, Gnanasara Thera was fined after pleading guilty to nine charges, including driving under the influence of alcohol, driving without a valid licence, driving without a revenue licence and failing to report an accident. The case was filed under case number 6315/2000 at the Colombo Traffic Court.

In August 2018, Gnanasara Thera was sentenced by the Court of Appeal to 19 years' rigorous imprisonment, to be served concurrently as six years, for contempt of court arising from his conduct during proceedings concerning the disappearance of journalist Prageeth Eknaligoda. The Supreme Court upheld the conviction in October 2018. He was released on 23 May 2019 following a presidential pardon granted by President Maithripala Sirisena. On 10 September 2026, the Supreme Court declared the pardon arbitrary and invalid in law, following fundamental rights petitions filed by the Centre for Policy Alternatives and Sandhya Ekneligoda. Gnanasara Thera was represented in those proceedings by Thishya Weragoda, appearing with Sanjaya Marambe and Iresh Senevirathne.

In March 2024, Gnanasara Thera was sentenced to four years' imprisonment in a separate case concerning statements about Islam. In January 2025, he received a nine-month prison sentence for making statements found to have incited religious hatred.

In separate proceedings before the Colombo High Court, Gnanasara Thera faced charges relating to statements allegedly insulting Islam and the Quran at a press conference in Colombo in April 2014. At a pre-trial conference held on 1 June 2026 before High Court Judge Buddhika Sri Ragala, the defence maintained that the statements had been made in the national interest and were directed against religious extremism. The matter was fixed for further proceedings on 26 June 2026. Gnanasara Thera was represented by Senior Counsel Asoka Weerasooriya, together with attorneys Sanjaya Marambe, Akarsha Weerasooriya and Pasan Karunarathna.

On 30 September 2026, the Colombo High Court issued a warrant for Gnanasara Thera's arrest after he failed to appear in court. His lawyers submitted a medical report and sought an adjournment, while the defence informed the court that representations had been made to the Attorney General concerning an early resolution of the proceedings. The court found the medical documentation insufficient and issued the warrant. Attorneys Shiraz Tawfeeq and M. K. Farzan appeared for the aggrieved party on the instructions of Shiraz Mohideen.

Following the annulment of his presidential pardon, Gnanasara Thera was arrested in October 2026. On 5 October, the Court of Appeal directed prison authorities to enforce the remainder of his contempt of court sentence. Attorneys Sudath Jayasundara and Iresh Seneviratne represented him, while Deputy Solicitor General Rajitha Perera and State Counsel Sajith Bandara appeared for the Attorney General.

At a subsequent Colombo High Court hearing on 23 October 2026, Senior Counsel Asoka Weerasooriya raised the removal of Gnanasara Thera's monastic robes by prison authorities. He informed the court that Gnanasara Thera and the Kotte Mahanayake Thera had requested permission for the robes to be ceremonially restored in accordance with Buddhist religious traditions and prison regulations, but had received no response. High Court Judge Buddhika Sri Ragala stated that the court lacked the authority to issue such an order. Weerasooriya also informed the court that representations had been made to the Attorney General seeking an early resolution of the criminal proceedings and referred to the possibility of concluding the case through a plea agreement under the Code of Criminal Procedure (Amendment) Act, No. 50 of 2024. The court directed the parties to report on the progress of the matter at the next hearing, fixed for 29 January 2027.
