= B. Jain =

Publishing House

- Founded: 1966
- Founder: Prem Nath Jain
- Country of origin: India
- Headquarters location: New Delhi
- Publication types: Books, journals, magazines
- Imprints: B. Jain Publishers, B. Jain Libros En Español, Health Harmony, Leads Press, Impact, Pegasus

B. Jain is an Indian publishing house with headquarters in New Delhi. The B. Jain publishing group has six book imprints and also publishes two monthly homeopathic journals, one monthly international journal on homeopathy and a bi-monthly lifestyle and health magazine.

== History ==
The B. Jain group was founded in 1966 by Prem Nath Jain (d. August 16, 2004). It initially started as a publishing house and then diversified into printing, homeopathic software, homeopathic study courses, bookstore, exports of handicrafts and women's accessories.

In 2003, Uttarakhand Chief Minister Narayan Dutt Tiwari presented Prem Nath Jain, the Bhaskar Award for publishing.

== Imprints ==
=== B. Jain Publishers ===
B. Jain is the largest publisher of Homeopathic books in India. The imprint has about 1200 books in print. It was one of the first publishers in India to venture into e-books, and has a strong distribution network of more than 1000 dealers all over the world.

=== Other imprints ===
B. Jain Libros En Español
B. Jain Libros en Español is an extension of B. Jain that publishes Homeopathic Books in Spanish. It has published more than 150 books, and publishes about 12 books a year. The books are sold in Spain, and North and South America.

Health Harmony
Health Harmony was introduced into the group in 1998, and has published about 700 books under its name. It now publishes about 40 books a year on general health, alternative therapies, spirituality, New Age, and self help.

Leads Press
Leads Press was established in 2004, and publishes non-fiction books. It has published around 150 books on subjects like games, puzzles, travel, business etc.

Impact
Impact was started in 2005 with an aim to publish books on fashion and design. It has printed about 10 books, and is now diversifying into art books as well.

Pegasus
Started in 2008, Pegasus now has more than 2000 books in print (includes collaborative efforts) and over 200 new titles get added to its list each year.

== Journals and magazines ==
The Homeopathic Heritage
The Homoeopathic Heritage is a homeopathy journal that was started in 1976. It has a subscriber base of more than 15,000. In 2007, B. Jain in partnership with Archibel, launched the international edition of the journal that is circulated all over America, Europe, Asia and Australia.

Homeobuzz
Homeobuzz is a monthly students' homeopathic journal that was launched in 2006.

Health n Harmony
Health n Harmony, a lifestyle bi-monthly magazine, was launched in early 2007. The magazine is centered around Alternative Health, Spirituality and other similar subjects. It also provides tips and information on travel, new age and general interest subjects. More than 25,000 copies are in circulation with readers in Indian subcontinent, Philippines, Singapore and Malaysia.

== J.J. Offset Printers ==
J.J. Offset Printers was established by the B. Jain Group for in-house needs, but was later expanded to serve other companies as well. It provides printing and packaging.

== Other organizations ==
B. Jain also runs a charitable Homeopathic health care centre under the name of B. Jain Sarbati Devi Memorial Charitable Trust. The B. Jain Foundation, a part of the trust, helps in providing education and health facilities to the poor.

B. Jain also runs an organization for the promotion of Homeopathy, called CASH (Centre for Advanced Study in Homeopathy). CASH organizes regular seminars and workshops to promote homeopathy. In 2005, it organized workshops and lectures on homeopathy by Robin Murphy in India.
