= Sinhalese Buddhist nationalism =

Political ideology in Sri Lanka

Sinhalese Buddhist nationalism is a Sri Lankan political ideology which combines a focus upon Sinhalese culture and ethnicity (nationalism) with an emphasis upon Theravada Buddhism, which is the majority belief system of most of the Sinhalese in Sri Lanka. It mostly revived in reaction to the colonisation of Sri Lanka by the British Empire and became increasingly assertive in the years following the independence of the country.

Sinhalese nationalism has generally been influenced by the contents of the Mahavamsa, the major Pali chronicle, written in the 6th century.

The ideology is associated with prominent former Sri Lankan political leaders including S. W. R. D. Bandaranaike, Sirimavo Bandaranaike and Mahinda Rajapaksa.

== Origins ==
The Sinhalese Buddhist national chronicle Mahavamsa ('Great Chronicle'), composed in the sixth century CE by Buddhist monks, contains historical accounts and mythological stories that have played a significant role in shaping and strengthening Sinhalese Buddhist identity. The Mahavamsa describes Gautama Buddha's three visits to Sri Lanka, during which he blesses and sanctifies the island, paving the way for his teachings to flourish there. The text also portrays the Buddha as instructing deities to protect the ancestors of the Sinhalese (Prince Vijaya and his followers from North India), enabling them to establish and propagate Buddhism in Sri Lanka. These inspiring narratives have contributed to the deeply held Sinhalese Buddhist belief that Sri Lanka is Sihadipa (island of the Sinhalese) and Dhammadipa (the island chosen to preserve and propagate Buddhism), instilling a strong sense of religious and national identity.

== Myths ==
The Mahavamsa, a 6th century CE chronicle, has had a profound influence on Sinhalese Buddhist culture and identity. The text contains mythological accounts of the Buddha's visits to Sri Lanka, during which he is said to have sanctified the island as a haven for Buddhism and entrusted its protection to the Sinhalese people.

The Mahavamsa also recounts the story of the Buddhist warrior king Dutugamunu and his battle against the Tamil king Elara to unite Sri Lanka under a Buddhist monarch. While the text depicts Elara as a good ruler, Dutugamunu's campaign is portrayed as necessary for the restoration and glory of Buddhism on the island.

Scholars have noted that the Mahavamsa's narratives have contributed to a belief among some Sinhalese Buddhists that they are the Buddha's chosen people and that Sri Lanka is a sacred Buddhist land. The text's depiction of the Buddha driving away Yakkhas, the island's non-human inhabitants, to establish Buddhism has been interpreted by some as providing justification for the use of violence in the name of religion and the removal of groups seen as uncooperative with Buddhist goals. However, the Mahavamsa remains an important religious and cultural text that has helped to shape Sinhalese Buddhist identity over many centuries.

== Contributions of Anagarika Dharmapala ==
Anagarika Dharmapala was one of the leading contributors to the Buddhist revival of the 19th century that led to the creation of Buddhist institutions and Buddhist schools to match those of the Christian missionaries, and to the independence movement of the 20th century. He illustrated the first three points in a public speech:

This bright, beautiful island was made into a Paradise by the Aryan Sinhalese before its destruction was brought about by the barbaric vandals. Its people did not know irreligion... Christianity and polytheism are responsible for the vulgar practices of killing animals, stealing, prostitution, licentiousness, lying and drunkenness... The ancient, historic, refined people, under the diabolism of vicious paganism, introduced by the British administrators, are now declining slowly away.

He called upon the Sinhalese people to rise. He strongly protested consumption of alcohol, killing of cattle and promoted vegetarianism.

== Relationship with other religions in Sri Lanka ==
Sinhalese Buddhist nationalism has a fractious relationship with other religious communities like Christians and Muslims, with protests often being organised by Buddhist nationalist organisations against Christians in the governance of the country through movements like Catholic Action. Relations between Buddhist nationalists and Hindus are more peaceful and friendly, with numerous Hindu figures, including Kandiah Neelakandan and T. Maheswaran working with Buddhist groups on the anti-conversion bill. Also, D. B. S. Jeyaraj noted that both Sri Lankan Hindu nationalism and Buddhist nationalism rose as reactions to Christianity. Hindu-Buddhist collaboration is growing more prevalent in Sri Lanka, with the rise of groups such as the Hindu-Buddhist Friendship Society.

In recent times the relationship between Sinhala Buddhist Nationalists and Sri Lankan Catholics has improved over several shared interests such as opposition to sterilisation and banning private tuition classes during religious holidays. Cardinal Malcolm Ranjith, who has served as Archbishop of Colombo since 2009, has also opposed secularism and supported Buddhism as state religion, which has received praise from Buddhist clergy. However Evangelical Christians continue to be distrusted.

== Organisations ==
=== Political parties ===
Party	Symbol	Founded	Leader	MPs	Coalition(s)	^{Refs.}
Janatha Vimukthi Peramuna		1965	Anura Kumara Dissanayake	159 / 225	DNA (2009–2010), UPFA (2004–2005), NPP (2019–)	
Sri Lanka Podujana Peramuna		2016	Mahinda Rajapaksa	3 / 225	SLPFA (2019–2022)	
Mawbima Janatha Pakshaya		2023	Dilith Jayaweera	1 / 225	SB (2024–)	
Sri Lanka Freedom Party		1951	Disputed	0 / 225	MEP (1956–1959), SP (1968–1977), PA (1994–), UPFA (2004–2019), SLPFA (2019–2022), FPA (2023–2024)	
Jathika Nidahas Peramuna		2008	Wimal Weerawansa	0 / 225	SLPFA (2019–2022), ULC (2022–), FPA (2023–2024)	
Jathika Hela Urumaya		2004	Ven. Omalpe Sobhitha Thero	0 / 225	UPFA (2010), UNF (2015–2020), SJB (2020–)	
New Lanka Freedom Party		2020	vacant	0 / 225	SJB (2020–2024)	
Sinhalaye Mahasammatha Bhoomiputra Pakshaya		1990	Harischandra Wijayatunga	0 / 225		

=== Other parties ===
- Pivithuru Hela Urumaya
- Sihala Urumaya
- Sinhala Maha Sabha (1936–1951)
- Apé Jana Bala Party

=== Militant ===
Logo	Name of movement	Ideology	Active	Successor	Notes
	Bodu Bala Sena	Anti-liberalism; Islamophobia; Ultranationalism	Yes	None	Led by Galagoda Aththe Gnanasara, far-right by position
	Sinhala Ravaya	Anti-liberalism	Yes	None	Allied with the Bodu Bala Sena
	Sinhala National Force	Fundamentalism	Yes	None	Minor group
	Ravana Balaya	Ravanism	Yes	None	Opposes Indian influence in Sri Lanka
	Sinhalese Force	Ultranationalism	No (1950–1955)	None	Used the Nazi salute to greet its leaders
	Jathika Vimukthi Peramuna	Corporatism	No (1957–1965)	Sihala Urumaya	Forced non-Sinhalese to leave Sinhalese areas

== See also ==
- Criticism of Buddhism
- Walisinghe Harischandra
- Black July
- Vahumpura
