= Aluthgama =

Aluthgama අලුත්ගම அளுத்கமை
- Town
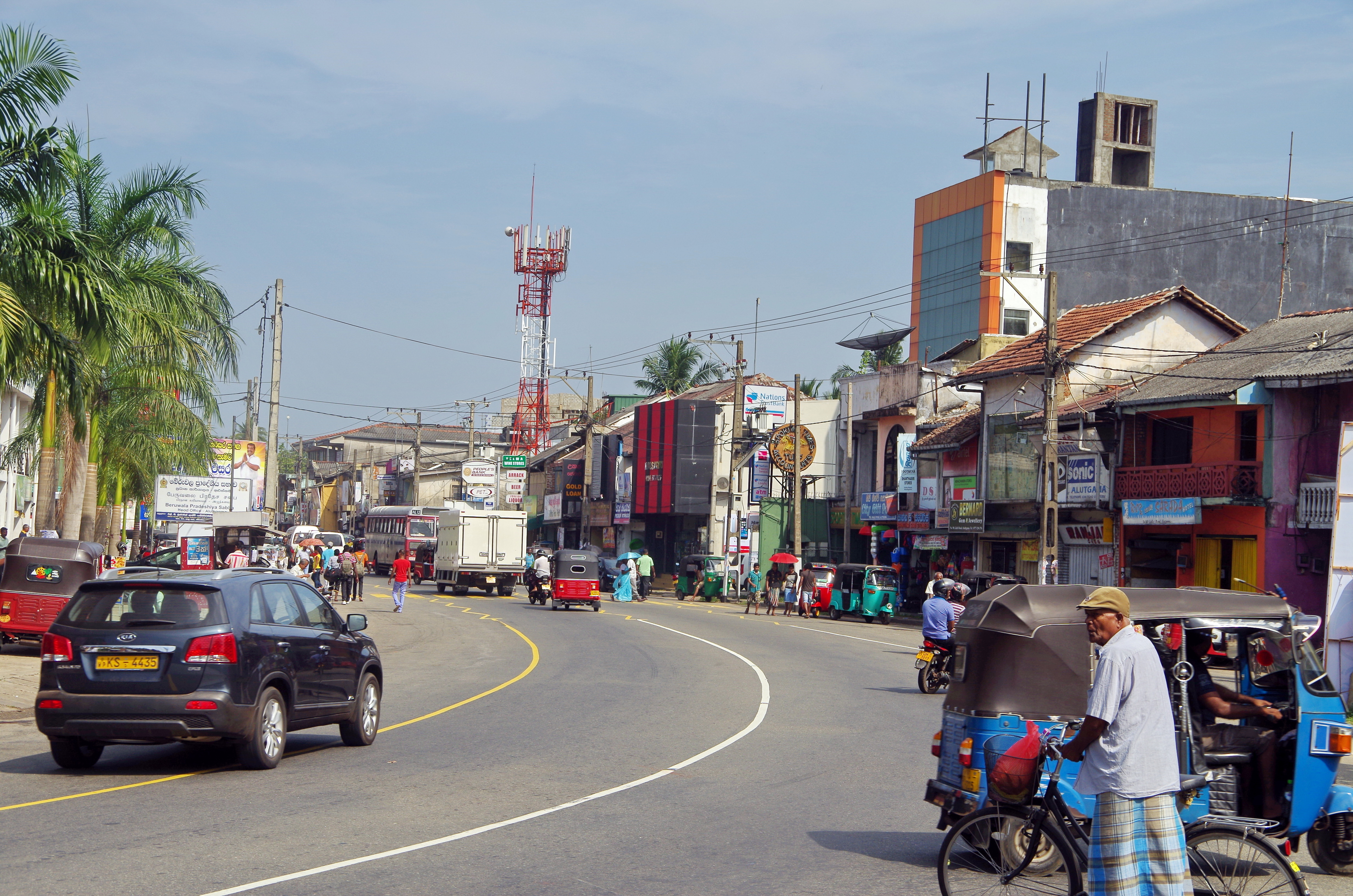

- Location within Sri Lanka
- Coordinates: 6°26′00″N 80°00′00″E
- Country: Sri Lanka
- Province: Western Province
- District: Kalutara District
- Time zone: UTC+5:30 (Sri Lanka Standard Time Zone)
- Postal Code: 12080

Aluthgama (Sinhala: අලුත්ගම, romanized: Alutgama; Tamil: அளுத்கமை, romanized: Aḷutkamai) is a coastal town in Kalutara District in the Western Province of Sri Lanka. It is approximately 63.5 kilometres (39.5 mi) south of Colombo and 68 kilometres (42 mi) north of Galle. Aluthgama is situated on the northern bank of the Bentota Ganga (River) mouth.

The main income is from tourism and banking. It is the birthplace of the celebrated singer and composer Nanda Malini.

Aluthgama is home to one of worlds tallest statues of the Buddha. It is a sitting Figure of 48.8 meters, and has been erected in the Kande Viharaya Temple north of the river.

== History ==
The history of Aluthgama dates back to the 13th century. A messenger poem, "Thisara Sandesha", written in 1366 mentions the beauty of Aluthgama.

On 15 June 2014, Aluthgama was the scene of the 2014 anti-Muslim riots in Sri Lanka which resulted in 4 deaths and 80 people injured.

== Education ==
- Aluthgama Maha Vidyalaya ( Mix School) up to A/L
- Sangamiththa Balika (Ladies College) up to O/L only

== Transport ==
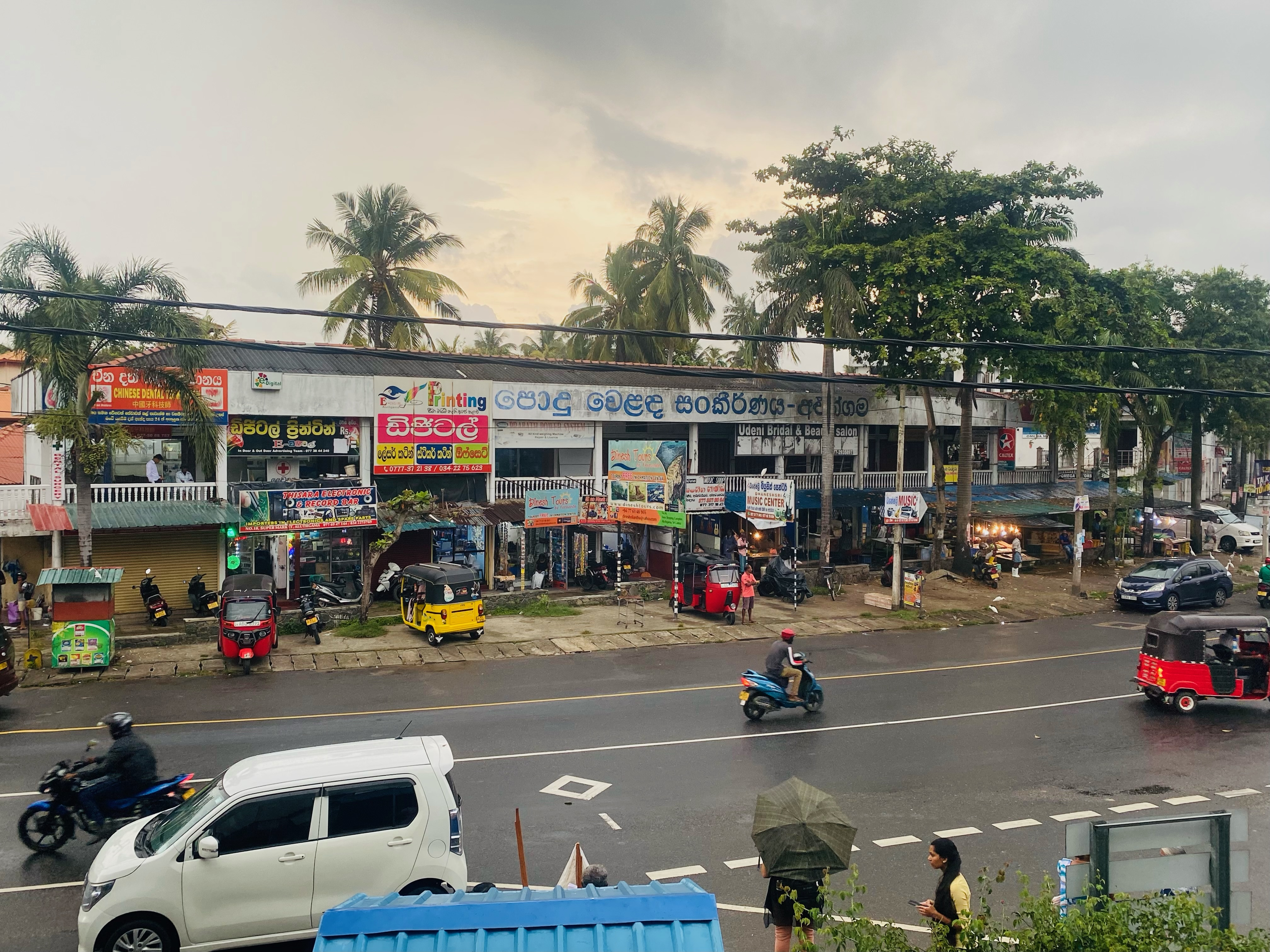
Aluthgama town

Aluthgama is located on the Coastal or Southern Rail Line (connecting Colombo through to Matara). It is also located on the A2 highway, connecting Colombo to Wellawaya. Following the construction of the Southern Expressway (E01) between Colombo and Galle, Aluthgama has become an entrance point to the expressway from Galle Road (A2), via B157.

== See also ==
- Railway stations in Sri Lanka
