= Neyinzaya River =

Neyinzaya River Neyinzaya Chaung

Location
- Country: Burma

Physical characteristics
- Source: Letha Mountains
  - location: Tonzang Township, Burma
  - coordinates: 23°45′N 93°49′E
  - elevation: 2,671 m (8,763 ft)
- Mouth: Myittha River
  - location: Kale Township, Burma
  - coordinates: 23°13′46″N 94°08′01″E

Neyinzaya River (Neyinzaya Chaung) is a river in Chin State and Sagaing Region of Burma (Myanmar). It is a tributary of the Myittha River, enterring it from the left (west) just south of Kalemyo.

At its headwaters in the Letha Mountains (Letha Tang) of Tonzang Township in Chin State it is known as the Tuimi Lui. It flows off the slopes of Mount Wapit (Wapit Vum) (7,854 feet (2,394 m)) and Mount Nauko (Nauko Vum) (8,764 feet (2,671 m)). It is joined by the Tuilam Lui from the right (west) and the Lauthu Lui from the left (north) and becomes the Neyinzaya below Leikan, as it flows into the Kale Valley and into western Sagaing Region. Within Tongzang Township, the Tuimi Lui forms the border between several village tracts: initially with Hangken to the south and Sipek to the north, then Hangken to the west and Suangpek to the east, and finally Sebawk to the south and west and Suangpek to the north and east before leaving Tonzang Township and Chin State.

Entering Kale Township of Sagaing region, the Neyinzaya is joined by the conjoined Nam Kyitlaw and Nam Sitpauk from the left (northeast). Just below Kontha the Nam Sitpet flows in from the left (east). At Kangyi it is joined by the Natmyaung River (Natmyaung Chaung) from the right (northwest). At Nanhannwe it is joined by the Nat-taga River (Natt-taga Chaung) from the right (west). Just below the village of Mawlaik it is joined by the Segyi River (Segyi Chaung) from the right (west). At Kyigon, just above Kalemyo it enters the Myittha River.

From Kontha downstream the Neyinzaya is navigable by boats during the rainy season; however, during the dry summers only the shallowest dugouts can use it.

== See also ==
- List of rivers of Burma
