= Kalay clashes =

Series of clashes in Sagaing Region, Myanmar in (2021-present)

- Part of the Myanmar civil war (2021–present) and the Myanmar conflict
Date	28 March 2021 – present (4 years, 11 months and 3 days)
Location	Mainly Kalay and surrounding villages, Myanmar
Status	Ongoing

Belligerents
State Administration Council (Note: 2021–2025)/State Security and Peace Commission (Note: 2025–present)/Myanmar; Tatmadaw; Myanmar Army; Myanmar Police Force	(Myanmar) National Unity Government; People's Defence Force; People's Defence Force, Kalay; Kalay Civil Army; Civil Disobedience Movement (CDM); Armed civilians

Strength
Unknown	Unknown

Casualties and losses
Over 4 killed Over 17 wounded	Over 36 killed (including civilians); Many wounded

The Kalay clashes are a series of clashes between the Tatmadaw and armed civilians in the town of Kalay and surrounding villages in Kale Township during the Myanmar civil war. The conflict in the township has become one of the first instances of armed resistance to the military of Myanmar apart from actions by Ethnic Armed Organizations during the recent unrest in the country following the February coup.

== Background ==
The first instances of armed resistance to the military crackdowns on protests in the area were reported on 28 March. Protesters armed with weapons such as homemade hunting rifles have set up strongholds in parts of Kalay and engaged in battles with the Tatmadaw, who stormed these strongholds on several occasions. In addition, armed villagers have ambushed and attacked Tatmadaw soldiers and policeman en route to the city in support of the protesters. Dozens of protesters, soldiers and policeman have been killed overall since 28 March.

== Clashes ==
On 28 March 2021, the Tatmadaw stormed the Tarhan protest camp, one of the protesters' strongholds in Kalay. Rebels clashed with the Tatmadaw in the city with homemade hunting rifles while villagers attacked soldiers outside the village. The armed civilians were forced to withdraw and the camp was destroyed by the Tatmadaw that night. 4 armed civilians and four soldiers were reportedly killed during the clashes, with 17 soldiers additionally injured.

Between 30 March and April, villagers around Kale township ambushed Tatmadaw reinforcements on the way to Kalay in an offensive which led to the deaths of 5 villagers. 11 protesters were killed in Kalay as well, without information about clashes. The protest camp was rebuilt and protests continued.

On 31 March a villager was shot in the head and killed by security forces in Natchaung, while four police officers were captured by insurrectionists in Kalay the same day, allegedly attempting to scout the protesters' positions. Around some time, the protesters in Kalay organized themselves into the "Kalay Civil Army." The captured police officers were later handed back over to the Tatmadaw in exchange for the release of 9 civilians who were detained by the military from the town. This is the first such deal that took place during the 2021 protests.

In the early morning hours of 7 April, the Tatamadaw carried out another assault on rebel strongholds in Kalay for the second time. Security forces stormed the Tarhan camp from multiple directions, armed with machine guns and grenades. Security forces sent to remove barricades opened fire on protesters. Kalay Civil Army fighters clashed with security forces, while 45 minutes into the battle Tatmadaw soldiers cut off Tarhan from reinforcements attempting to bolster the camp's defenders. 11 armed civilians were reportedly killed, with 10 injured in the clashes. while an arrest campaign took place in the town. Protesters nevertheless took to the streets hours later.

== Subsequence ==
As a result, People's Defence Force – Kalay (Burmese: ပြည်သူ့ကာကွယ်ရေးတပ်ဖွဲ့ (ကလေး) abbreviated PDF Kalay) was formed.

== See also ==
- 2021 Myanmar coup d'état
- Timeline of the 2021–2022 Myanmar protests
- People's Defence Force – Kalay
