= List of protests in Myanmar =

The following protests have taken, or are taking, place in Myanmar:

- 1962 Rangoon University protests
- 1974 U Thant funeral protests after the death of U Thant
- 1988 Burmese anti-government protests associated with the 8888 Uprising
- 2007 Myanmar anti-government protests associated with the Saffron Revolution
- 2014–2015 Burmese protests in response to the Myanmar National Education Law 2014
- 2015 Black Ribbon Movement Myanmar of medical professions and medical students
- 2015 Yellow Ribbon Campaign of Myanmar movement of lawyers
- 2019 nationwide protests in response to the Naypyidaw Victoria rape case
- 2021–2023 Myanmar protests in opposition to the 2021 Myanmar coup d'état
  - March 2021 Death of Khant Nyar Hein
  - March–April 2021 Kalay clashes
  - April 2021 Clash at Thaw Le Hta
