= Ngapa =

Ngapa may refer to:

- Ngapa, Burma, a village in Kale Township, Sagaing Region of Burma
- Ngapa, Central Sulawesi, a village in Donggala Regency, Central Sulawsi, Indonesia
- Ngapa, South East Sulawesi, a village in Kolaka Regency, South East Sulawesi, Indonesia
- Ngapa, Mozambique, a village in Mueda District, Cabo Delgado Province, Mozambique
- Ngapa, Tanzania, a ward in Tunduru District, Ruvuma Region, Tanzania
- Ngapa, one of the clans who are the traditional indigenous owners of Muckaty Station, Northern Territory, Australia
