= Sihaung =

Sihaung may refer to the following places in Myanmar:

- Sihaung Ashe
- Sihaung Myauk
- Sihaung Taung
