= Mawlaik (disambiguation) =

Mawlaik may refer to several places in Burma:

- Mawlaik, town and seat of Mawlaik District, Sagaing Region
- Mawlaik, Kale, village in Kale Township, Sagaing Region
