= Kyigon, Kale Township =

Kyigon
- Village
- Location in Burma
- Coordinates: 23°13′46″N 94°08′01″E
- Country: Burma
- Region: Sagaing Region
- District: Kale District
- Township: Kale Township
- Time zone: UTC+6.30 (MST)

Kyigon is a village in Kale Township, Kale District, in the Sagaing Region of western Burma (Myanmar). Kyigon is located on the left (north) bank of the Myittha River about 2.4 kilometres (1.5 mi) above where the Neyinzaya River enters the Myittha. It is about 8.8 kilometres (5.5 mi) northeast of the regional capital at Kalemyo.
