= Kokko =

Kokko may refer to:

- Kokko (surname)
- Kokko, Kale, Burma

== See also ==
- Kokkola, a town and municipality of Finland
