= Sibin =

Sibin may refer to:

- Sibiu, Romania
- Sibin, Poland
- Sibin, Kale, Burma
- Sibin Slavković, Serbian comic book artist
