= Petri Kokko =

Petri Kokko may refer to:

- Petri Kokko (figure skater) (born 1966), former Finnish figure skater
- Petri Kokko (ice hockey) (born 1975), Finnish ice hockey player
- Petri Kokko (speedway rider), Finnish motorcycle speedway rider
