= Thazi =

Thazi may refer to:

== Mandalay Region, Burma ==
- Thazi Township, in Meiktila District
  - Thazi, Myanmar, a town in Thazi Township

== Sagaing Region, Burma ==
- Thazi, Kale, a village in Kale Township
- Thazi, Monywa, a community in Monywa Township
- Thazi, Sagaing, a community in Sagaing Township
- Thazi, Mingin, a village in Mingin Township

== Bago Region, Burma ==
- Thazi, Pyu, a community in Pyu Township
