= Segyi =

Segyi may refer to several places in Burma:

- Segyi, Kale
- Segyi, Kalewa
