= Thayettaw =

Thayettaw may refer to:

- Thayettaw Monastery, a complex of over 60 Buddhist monasteries in Yangon, Myanmar
- Thayettaw, Sagaing, a village in Kale Township, Kale District, in the Sagaing Region of western Burma
