= Insein =

Insein is the name of several places in Burma:

- Insein Township
- Insein, Kale
- Insein Prison
