= Palata =

Palata has various meanings depending on language. In Italian and Spanish, it is found as a toponym. In Serbian, it means "palace". It may refer to:

== Places ==
- Palata, Italy, a comune
- Palata Rural Municipality, Nepal
- Palata (river), in Belarus and Russia
- Paḷāta, romanized spelling of the Sinhalese word for province - see Provinces of Sri Lanka

== Buildings ==
- Palace of Serbia (Palata Srbije), in Belgrade, Serbia
- Palace Albanija (Palata Albanija), in Belgrade, Serbia
- Warrior House (Palata Ratnički dom), in Belgrade, Serbia

== Other uses ==
- Palata (surname)
- Duke of Palata, a title in the peerage of Spain
- Palata, another name for the Adamawa Fulfulde variety of the Fula language, spoken in Cameroon

== See also ==
- Palata Sakan, a village in western Burma
- Palatas, a surname
