= Kyawywa =

Kyawywa may refer to several places in Burma:

- Kyawywa, Kale
- Kyawywa, Mingin
