= Palata (surname) =

Palata is a surname. Notable people with the surname include:

- Astride Palata (born 1982), Congolese handball player
- Jonathan Palata (fl. 2011), British heavyweight boxer

== See also ==
- Palatas
- Palata (disambiguation)
