= Legyi =

Legyi may refer to several places in Burma:

- Legyi, Kale
- Legyi, Myinmu
- Legyi, Mogok, in Mogok Township
