= Yenatha =

Yenatha may refer the following places in Myanmar:

- Yenatha, Kale, village in Kale Township, Kale District, in the Sagaing Region
- Yenatha, Madaya, village in Madaya Township, Pyin Oo Lwin District, in the Mandalay Region
