= Myohla =

Myohla may refer to several places in Burma:

- Myohla, Kale
- Myohla, Shwegu
