= Lamaing =

Lamaing may refer to several places in Burma (Myanmar):

- Lamaing, Kale
- Lamaing, Madaya
- Lamaing, Singu
- Lamaing, Ye
