= Udu (disambiguation) =

Udu or UDU may refer to:

== Places ==
- Udu, Kale, Burma
- Udu, Nigeria

== Other uses ==
- Udu, an Igbo percussion instrument
- Uduk language
- Integration by substitution, also known as "udu substitution"
- Ulster Defence Union, an Irish unionist organisation
