= Siyin =

Siyin may refer to:

- Siyin, Burma, a village, a valley and a Reserve Forest in western Burma
- The Sizang, a Chin people, also known as the Siyin or the Thaute people
- Siyin Island, an island, part of the Dongyin Township, in Lienchiang County (the Matsu Islands), Taiwan (ROC)
