= 2013 Myanmar anti-Muslim riots =

2013 riots in central and eastern Myanmar

- Location: Sagaing Region, Mandalay Region, Shan State
- Date: 20 March 2013 – 2 October 2013 (UTC+06:30)
- Attack type: Religious
- Deaths: 50+
- Injuries: 80+

The 2013 Myanmar anti-Muslim riots were a series of conflicts in various cities throughout central and eastern Myanmar (Burma).

== March riots in Meiktila ==
Tensions between Buddhist and Muslim ethnic groups flared into violent clashes in Meiktila, Mandalay Division on 20 March and continued until the 22nd, killing at least 40 and wounding 61 people. The violence started on 20 March after a Muslim gold shop owner, his wife, and two Muslim employees assaulted a Buddhist customer and her husband in an argument over a gold hairpin. A large mob formed and began to destroy the shop. The heavily outnumbered police reportedly told the mob to disperse after they had destroyed the shop. In the evening, a local Buddhist monk not involved in the incident was dragged from his bicycle, doused in petrol, and burnt alive by six Muslim youths at a nearby mosque. The killing of the monk caused the relatively contained situation to explode, greatly increasing the scope and intensity of the violence.

The deadliest incident occurred when a Buddhist mob attacked and torched the Mingalar Zayone Islamic Boarding School. While outnumbered security forces stood by, rioters armed with machetes, metal pipes, chains, and stones killed 32 Rohingya children under 6 years old, teenage students and four teachers.

On 25 March, communal rioting targeting Muslim houses and mosques spread to the towns of Othekone, Tatkone and Yamenthin. At least 9,000 residents were documented to have been displaced by the violence. In April, the BBC obtained a leaked police video showing outnumbered police officers standing by while rioters torched houses and businesses in Meiktila. The video also shows the burning and killing of at least two Muslim students at the hands of rioters, which included Buddhist monks. The video was captured to prosecute the perpetrators later in court. On the third day, the situation stabilised when the government declared a state of emergency and deployed military troops.

On 21 May, seven Muslims, including the gold shop owner and those who perpetrated the murder of the monk, were convicted for inciting the unrest and jailed from 2 up to 28 years. In July, the Burmese courts sentenced 25 Buddhists to up to 15 years in prison for murder and other crimes during the riot.

== April riots in Okkan ==
On 30 April 400 Buddhists armed with bricks and sticks overran mosques and torched more than 100 homes and shops in Okkan, killing two people and injuring at least ten more. Another 77 homes were destroyed in the nearby villages of Yadanakon, Panipin, Chaukthe and Thekon. The riot reportedly began when a Muslim woman on a motorcycle accidentally bumped into a Buddhist monk, knocking over his alms bowl.

== May riots in Lashio ==
On 29 May, violence broke out in Lashio, Shan State, near Myanmar's border with China, after a rumour spread on social media that a 48-year-old Muslim man named Ne Win poured petrol on a young Buddhist woman with whom he was arguing and set her on fire. In response, a Buddhist mob armed with machetes and bamboo poles torched a mosque, a Muslim orphanage, and several shops after the police refused to surrender Ne Win. The Buddhists continued to riot the next day and at least one person died. Sword-wielding Buddhist gangs began patrolling the streets on motorbikes, forcing as many as 1,400 Muslims to take shelter in a Buddhist monastery until the police and army were able to restore order.

== August riots in Kantbalu ==
On 24 August, violence once again flared up in Htan Gon village, 16 kilometres south of Kantbalu in the Sagaing Region, following rumours that a Muslim man tried to sexually assault a young Buddhist woman. Local monks led a 1,000-strong Buddhist mob to retaliate by burning down Muslim owned businesses and the village mosque. State television reported that 42 houses and 15 shops owned primarily by Muslims were razed during the three-hour riot. One firefighter and one civilian were injured in the incident. Police officers were powerless to contain the violence, but finally dispersed the mob by firing their pistols into the air.

== October riots in Thandwe ==
Between 29 September and 2 October, Rakhine Buddhists rioted and attacked Kamein Muslims in Thabyachaing and Linthi villages, about 20 kilometres north of the coastal town of Thandwe in Rakhine State. Seven Muslims and two Buddhists were killed and between 70 and 80 houses were set on fire. About 500 ethnic Kamein Muslims were forced to flee from their homes. Local residents were worried that a further round of violence between Rakhine Buddhist and Muslim communities would ensue after two young Rakhine Buddhists girls aged five and six were found murdered on 17 and 18 November in separate incidents. One victim reportedly appeared to have been raped.

== Spillover ==
In April 2013, Muslim and Buddhist detainees from Myanmar clashed at a refugee camp in Indonesia. Eight Buddhists were killed and fifteen other people were wounded. Sources have asserted that the provocation for the riot was due to sexual harassment against female Rohingya Muslim inmates by the Rakhine Buddhist inmates. An Indonesian court jailed 14 Muslim Rohingya for nine months each in December. The sentence was lighter than the maximum penalty for violence resulting in death, which is 12 years. The men's lawyer said they would appeal for freedom because there was no real evidence shown during the trial.

In May, two Muslims were arrested for planning to attack the Myanmar embassy in Jakarta, Indonesia with pipe-bombs. The mastermind of the plot said he was still at war with anyone oppressing Muslims.

In June, at least four Buddhists were murdered in Malaysia which was linked to ethnic tensions in Myanmar. All the victims, including a man slashed to death by a machete-wielding mob in Kuala Lumpur, were Buddhists from Myanmar. Malaysian police had arrested approximately 60 Burmese immigrants in an attempt to control tensions.

In July, Muslims were blamed for the Bodh Gaya bombings, which targeted one of Buddhism's most revered sites. Five people, including two Buddhist monks, were injured by the blasts.

On 5 August, two pipe-bombs went off outside the Ekayana Buddhist Centre in West Jakarta as some 300 people gathered inside the temple for a sermon, injuring three people. There was a note from the perpetrators that read "We respond to the screams of the Rohingya".

== See also ==
- Persecution of Muslims in Myanmar
- 2002 Gujarat riots: Around 1,000 Muslims and 400 Hindus were killed
