= Battle of Thaw Le Hta =

2021 armed clash near the Myanmar–Thailand border

Thaw Le Hta offensive
- Part of the Karen conflict
Date	26 April 2021
Location	Thaw Le Hta, a Tatmadaw military base located by the Salween River and Myanmar–Thailand border 17.98275°N 97.733337°E
Result	KNU victory: KNLA captures and destroys a Tatmadaw military base; Tatmadaw retaliates with airstrikes in Kayin State

Belligerents
Myanmar: Tatmadaw	Karen National Union: Karen National Liberation Army

On 26 April 2021, the Tatmadaw and the Karen National Liberation Army (the armed wing of the Karen National Union) clashed near the Myanmar–Thailand border. The fighting ended with the capture and scorching of a Tatmadaw military base by the Karen National Liberation Army. The Tatmadaw responded with airstrikes in Kayin State. As of late April, 2021, Al Jazeera described the clashes as "the fiercest fighting between the Tatmadaw and an ethnic armed group since the 1 February coup."

The clashes occurred in the backdrop of increasing violence and protests in Myanmar caused by the Tatmadaw's coup on 1 February 2021. Prior to the clashes, international organisations and analysts, such as the United Nations Special Envoy on Myanmar, warned that an escalation in violence could lead to a nationwide civil war. The clashes also broke a brief period of "relative calm" that followed the ASEAN Summit held two days earlier.

== See also ==
- 2021 Myanmar coup d'état
- Myanmar protests (2021–present)
- Timeline of the 2021–2022 Myanmar protests
