= Shabo, Kale =

Shabo
- Village
- Location in Myanmar
- Coordinates: 22°48′N 94°3′E
- Country: Myanmar
- Region: Sagaing Region
- District: Kale District
- Township: Kale Township
- Time zone: UTC+6.30 (MST)

Shabo is a village in Kale Township, Kale District, in the Sagaing Region of western Myanmar.
