= People's Defence Force (Kalay) =

Local defence force in Kalaymyo, Sagaing Region, Myanmar

- ပြည်သူ့ကာကွယ်ရေးတပ်ဖွဲ့ (ကလေး)
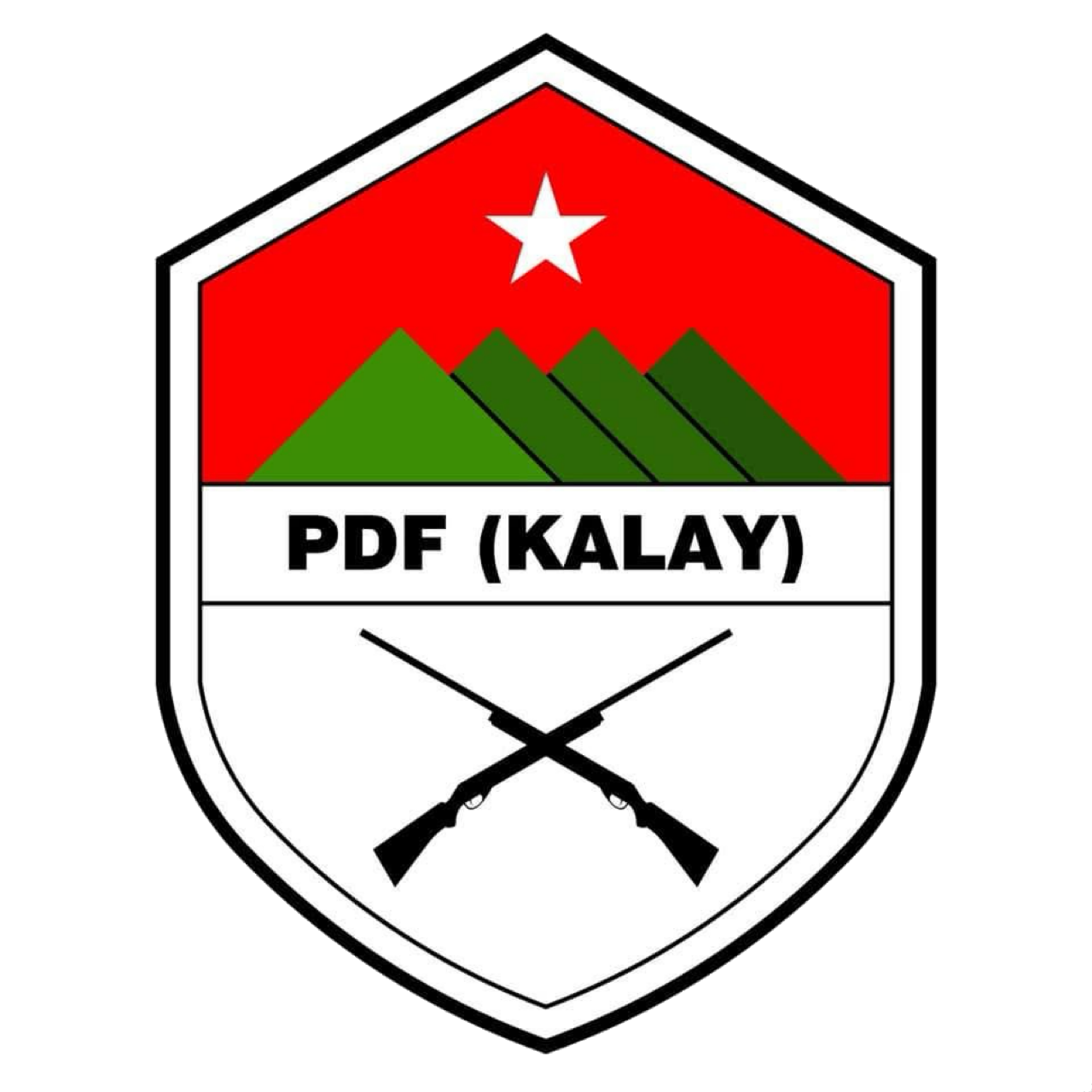
- Headquarters: Kalay
- Active regions: Kalay, Sagaing Region
- Size: 800+
- Part of: Myanmar (NUG): People's Defence Force

People's Defence Force (Kalay) (Burmese: ပြည်သူ့ကာကွယ်ရေးတပ်ဖွဲ့ (ကလေး) abbreviated PDF Kalay) is a local defence force operating in Kalaymyo, Sagain. It was formed by Myanmar youths under the National Unity Government and pro-democracy activists in 2021 in response to the coup d'état that occurred on 1 February 2021 and the ongoing violence in Myanmar by the military junta. The force comprises 12 battalions.
