= North Kolaka Regency =

Regency in Southeast Sulawesi, Indonesia

North Kolaka Regency Kabupaten Kolaka Utara
- Regency
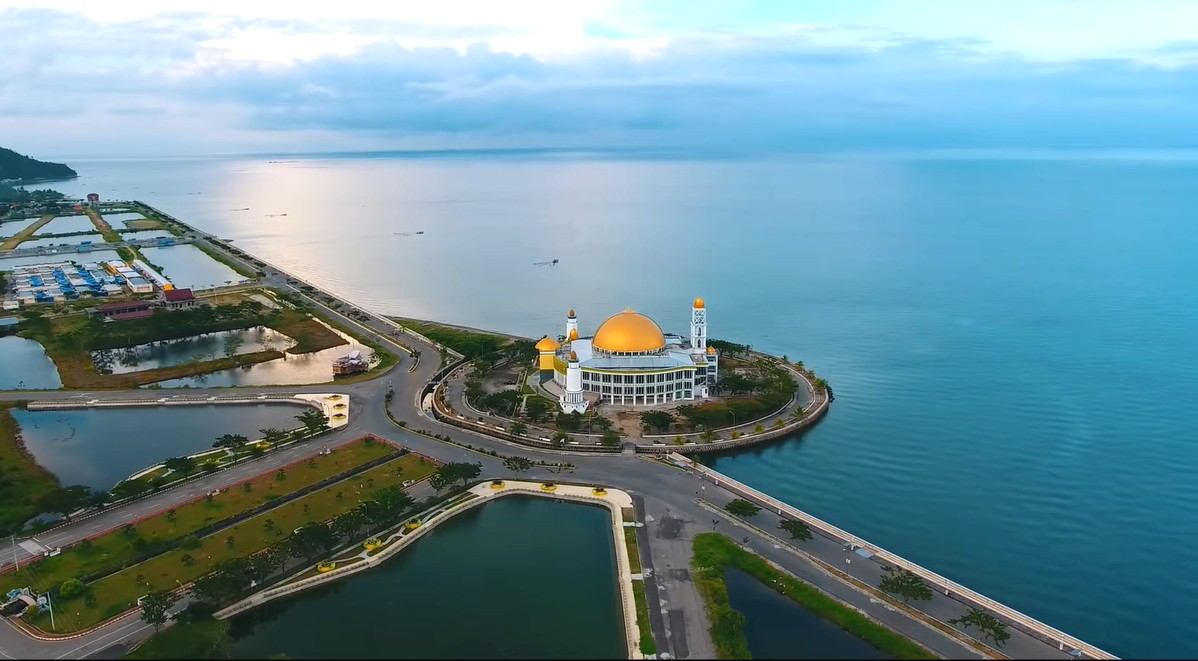
- The great mosque of Lasusua in the capital of North Kolaka

- Seal

- Location within Southeast Sulawesi

- Location in Sulawesi and Indonesia North Kolaka Regency (Indonesia)
- Coordinates: 3°20′14″S 121°02′38″E
- Country: Indonesia
- Province: Southeast Sulawesi
- Anniversary: 7 January 2004
- Capital: Lasusua

Government
  - Regent: Nur Rahman Umar
  - Vice Regent: Jumarding

Area
  - Total: 2,933.05 km^{2} (1,132.46 sq mi)

Population (mid 2025 estimate)
  - Total: 145,679
  - Density: 49.6681/km^{2} (128.640/sq mi)
- Time zone: UTC+8 (ICST)
- Area code: (+62) 405
- Website: kolutkab.go.id

North Kolaka Regency is a regency in the northwest part of Southeast Sulawesi province of Indonesia. It was created on 18 December 2003 from the former northern districts of Kolaka Regency. It covers an area of 2,933.05 km^{2}, and had a population of 121,476 at the 2010 Census, and 137,700 at the 2020 Census; the official estimate as at mid 2025 was 145,679 (comprising 74,582 males and 71,097 females). The principal town lies at Lasusua.

== Administration ==
The North Kolaka Regency is divided into fifteen districts (kecamatan), tabulated below from south to north, with their areas (as given by the regency BPS) and their populations at the 2010 Census and the 2020 Census, together with the official estimates as at mid 2025. The table also includes the location of the district administrative centres and the number of villages in each district (totalling 133 - comprising 127 rural desa and 6 urban kelurahan).

Kode Wilayah	Name of District (kecamatan)	Area in km^{2}	Pop'n Census 2010	Pop'n Census 2020	Pop'n Estimate mid 2025	Admin centre	No. of villages
74.08.07	Wawo	265.30	5,615	6,805	7,188	Wawo	7
74.08.08	Lambai	98.12	5,308	6,370	7,195	Lambai	7
74.08.04	Ranteangin	83.42	5,301	5,951	6,161	Rante Angin	7 *
74.08.01	Lasusua	269.78	21,756	27,249	29,716	Lasusua	12 *
74.08.13	Katoi	144.57	5,763	6,930	7,408	Katoi	6
74.08.05	Kodeoha	137.31	10,644	11,259	11,592	Mala-Mala	12 *
74.08.14	Tiwu	35.55	4,042	4,553	4,849	Tiwu	7
74.08.06	Ngapa	219.93	17,355	17,284	17,256	Lapai	12 *
74.08.09	Watunohu	33.31	6,212	6,713	7,279	Watunohu	8
74.08.02	Pakue	153.61	9,345	10,301	10,757	Olo-Oloho	11 *
74.08.10	Pakue Tengah (Central Pakue)	174.12	6,132	7,489	7,738	Latali	10
74.08.11	Pakue Utara (North Pakue)	224.48	6,966	8,048	8,402	Pakue	9
74.08.03	Batu Putih	236.38	7,372	8,512	9,229	Batu Putih	11 *
74.08.12	Porehu	571.87	6,936	6,704	6,822	Porehu	8
74.08.15	Tolala	285.29	2,593	3,491	4,087	Tolala	6
	Totals	2,933.05	121,340	137,659	145,679	Lasusua	133

Note that an asterisk in the final column indicates the number includes one kelurahan (in each case with the same name as the district administrative centre).

== Climate ==
Lasusua, the seat of the regency has a tropical rainforest climate (Af) with moderate rainfall in October and November and heavy to very heavy rainfall in the remaining months.

Climate data for Lasusua
Month	Jan	Feb	Mar	Apr	May	Jun	Jul	Aug	Sep	Oct	Nov	Dec	Year
Mean daily maximum °C (°F)	30.6 (87.1)	30.7 (87.3)	30.9 (87.6)	31.1 (88.0)	30.9 (87.6)	30.2 (86.4)	30.0 (86.0)	30.8 (87.4)	31.5 (88.7)	32.3 (90.1)	31.9 (89.4)	31.1 (88.0)	31.0 (87.8)
Daily mean °C (°F)	26.8 (80.2)	27.0 (80.6)	27.1 (80.8)	27.2 (81.0)	27.2 (81.0)	26.4 (79.5)	26.0 (78.8)	26.3 (79.3)	26.8 (80.2)	27.4 (81.3)	27.6 (81.7)	27.2 (81.0)	26.9 (80.5)
Mean daily minimum °C (°F)	23.1 (73.6)	23.3 (73.9)	23.3 (73.9)	23.3 (73.9)	23.5 (74.3)	22.7 (72.9)	22.0 (71.6)	21.9 (71.4)	22.1 (71.8)	22.6 (72.7)	23.3 (73.9)	23.3 (73.9)	22.9 (73.1)
Average rainfall mm (inches)	158 (6.2)	169 (6.7)	191 (7.5)	238 (9.4)	361 (14.2)	298 (11.7)	228 (9.0)	192 (7.6)	177 (7.0)	123 (4.8)	118 (4.6)	137 (5.4)	2,390 (94.1)
Source: Climate-Data.org

== Villages ==
- Walasiho
