= Kyun Chaung =

kyun Chaung Tuan Chaung
- Village
- Kyun Chaung
- Location in Burma
- Coordinates: 23°6′31″N 94°0′31″E
- Country: Burma
- Region: Sagaing Region
- District: Kale District
- Township: Kale Township
- Time zone: UTC+6.30 (MST)
- Postal code: 02091

Kyun Chaung is a village in Kale Township, Kale District, in the Sagaing Region of western Burma.
