= Natkyigon =

- Village
- Location in Myanmar
- Coordinates: 23°15′N 94°11′E
- Country: Burma
- Region: Sagaing Region
- District: Kale District
- Township: Kale Township
- Time zone: UTC+6.30 (MST)

Natkyigon is a village in Kale Township, Kale District, in the Sagaing Region of western Myanmar.
