= Siyin, Myanmar =

Siyin Sizang
- Village
- Location in Myanmar
- Coordinates: 23°12′29″N 93°58′37″E
- Country: Myanmar
- Region: Sagaing Region
- District: Kale District
- Township: Kale Township
- Time zone: UTC+6.30 (MST)

Siyin is a village in Kale Township, Kale District, in the Sagaing Region of western Myanmar. It is located about 10 kilometres (6.2 mi) west of Kalemyo on the Kalemyo – Theizang road. It lies at the mouth of the Siyin Valley where it debouches into the Kale Valley.
