= Walasiho =

- Location in Southeast Sulawesi and Indonesia Walasiho (Indonesia)
- Coordinates: 3°39′50.2488″S 121°12′0.594″E
- Country: Indonesia
- Province: Southeast Sulawesi
- Regency: North Kolaka Regency
- District: Wawo District
- Elevation: 5,915 ft (1,803 m)

Population (2010)
  - Total: 749
- Time zone: UTC+8 (Indonesia Central Standard Time)

Walasiho is a village in Wawo district, North Kolaka Regency in Southeast Sulawesi province. Its population is 749.

== Climate ==
Walasiho has a subtropical highland climate (Cfb) with heavy to very heavy rainfall year-round.

Climate data for Walasiho
Month	Jan	Feb	Mar	Apr	May	Jun	Jul	Aug	Sep	Oct	Nov	Dec	Year
Mean daily maximum °C (°F)	22.2 (72.0)	22.1 (71.8)	22.1 (71.8)	21.6 (70.9)	20.8 (69.4)	19.8 (67.6)	19.3 (66.7)	20.1 (68.2)	21.3 (70.3)	23.0 (73.4)	22.9 (73.2)	22.3 (72.1)	21.5 (70.6)
Daily mean °C (°F)	17.9 (64.2)	17.8 (64.0)	17.9 (64.2)	17.7 (63.9)	17.4 (63.3)	16.6 (61.9)	16.0 (60.8)	16.2 (61.2)	16.9 (62.4)	18.0 (64.4)	18.1 (64.6)	18.0 (64.4)	17.4 (63.3)
Mean daily minimum °C (°F)	13.6 (56.5)	13.6 (56.5)	13.8 (56.8)	13.8 (56.8)	14.0 (57.2)	13.5 (56.3)	12.7 (54.9)	12.4 (54.3)	12.5 (54.5)	13.0 (55.4)	13.4 (56.1)	13.7 (56.7)	13.3 (56.0)
Average precipitation mm (inches)	357 (14.1)	340 (13.4)	278 (10.9)	299 (11.8)	261 (10.3)	203 (8.0)	156 (6.1)	132 (5.2)	93 (3.7)	96 (3.8)	190 (7.5)	282 (11.1)	2,687 (105.9)
Source: Climate-Data.org
