= Timeline of the 2021–2022 Myanmar protests =

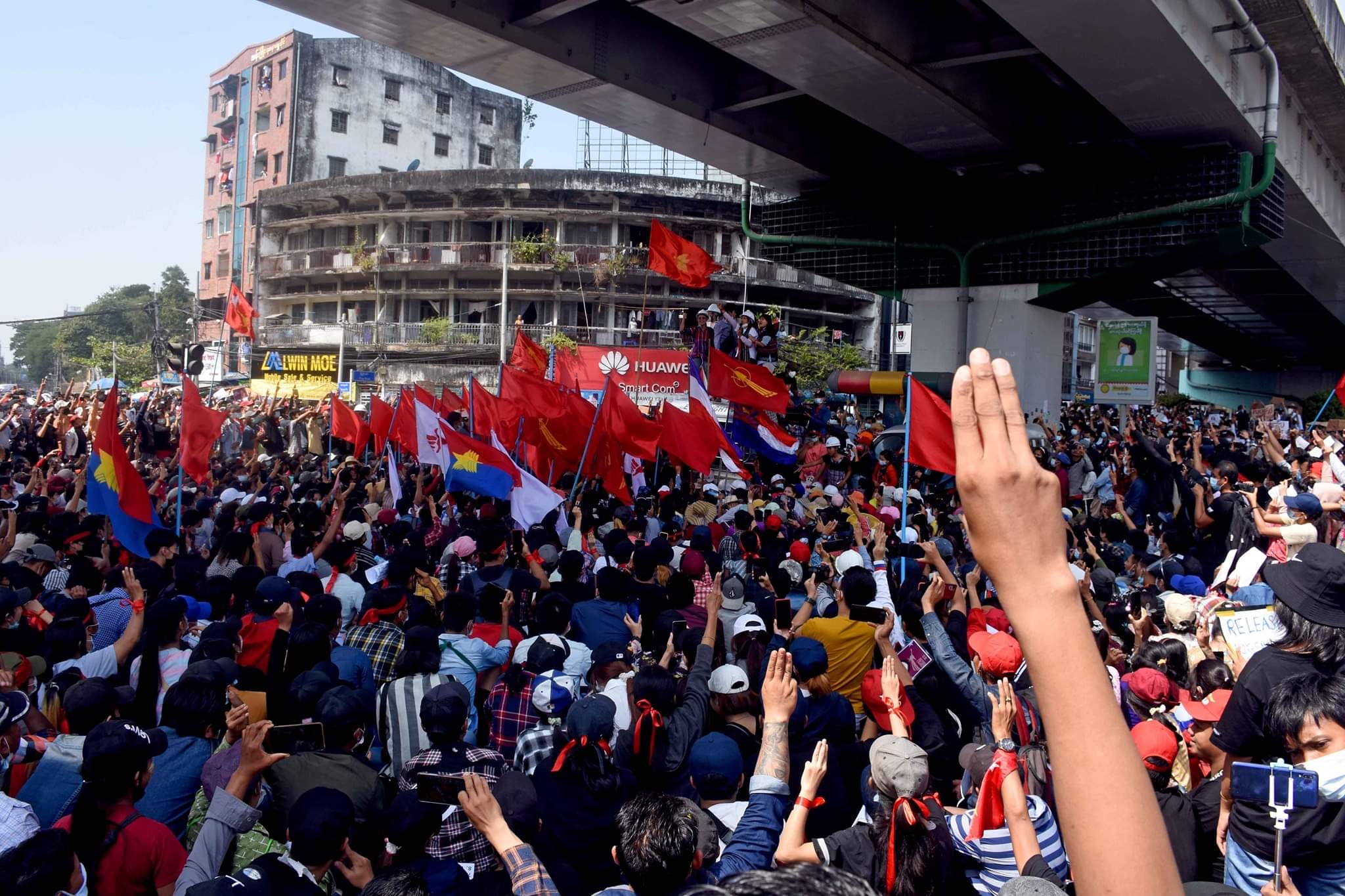
Protesters against the military coup in Yangon.

The timeline of the 2021 Myanmar Revolution chronicles the 2021 Myanmar protests, known locally as the Spring Revolution (Burmese: နွေဦးတော်လှန်ရေး), that began in early 2021 in opposition to the coup d'état on 1 February, staged by Min Aung Hlaing, the commander-in-chief of the country's armed forces, the Tatmadaw.

== January ==
=== Pro-military protests ===
In the lead-up to the coup, pro-military protesters had begun rallying in an attempt to de-legitimise the results of the 2020 elections. Wai Wai Nu of the Women's Peace Network noted the potential for violent attacks on pro-democracy protesters by pro-military protesters. On 30 December, approximately 400 pro-military protesters and nationalists demonstrated in front of Yangon City Hall, in violation of COVID-19 guidelines. On 14 January, about a thousand protesters gathered in Mandalay's Pyawbwe Township to dispute election results, waving military flags.

On 28 January, pro-military protesters incited violence, hurling bricks at a police car in Yangon. None of the protesters were arrested and were then transported away from the site by ten unmarked vehicles. On the evening of 30 January, approximately 500 pro-military protesters incited a riot near Yangon's Shwedagon Pagoda.

== February ==
=== Anti-coup protests ===
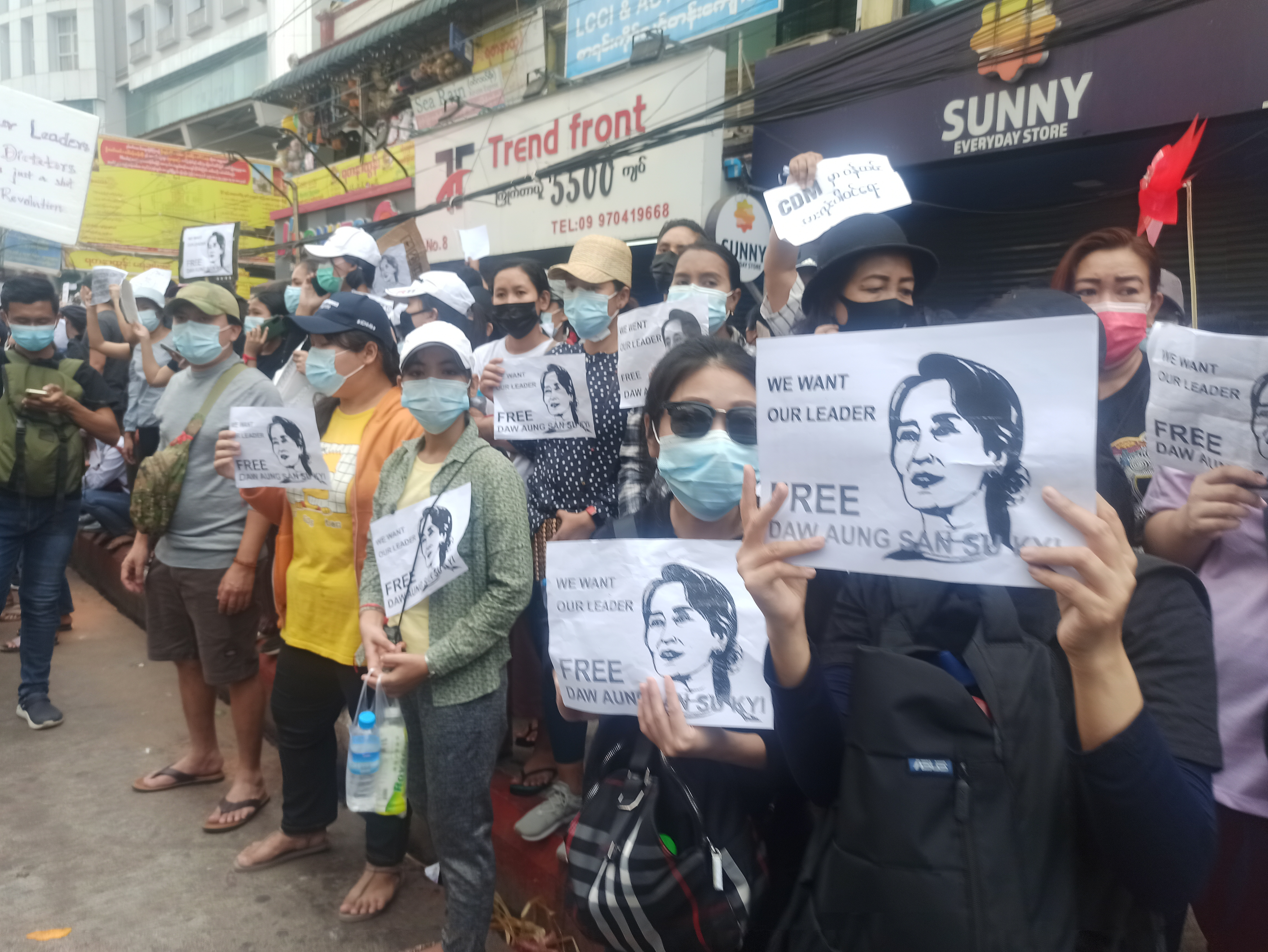
Protesters in Yangon carrying signs reading "Free Daw Aung San Suu Kyi" on 8 February 2021

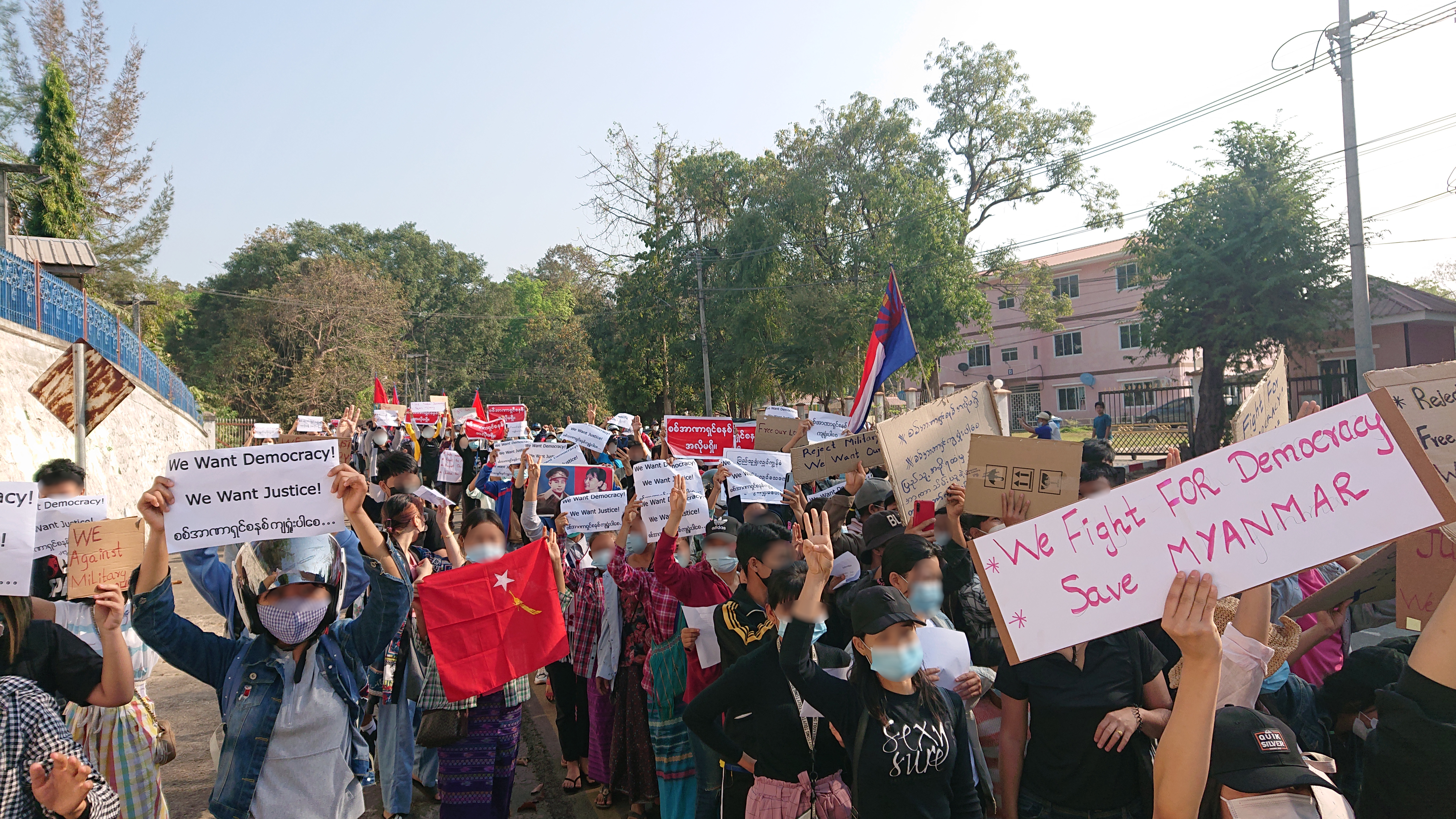
People from Hpa-an protesting against military coup (9 February 2021)

On 2 February 2021, some Yangonites staged a brief 15-minute protest rally at 20:00 local time, calling for the overthrow of the dictatorship and Suu Kyi's release. On 4 February 2021, thirty citizens protested against the coup d'état, in front of the University of Medicine in Mandalay, an act that led to four arrests.

On 6 February 2021, the first large-scale protests were organised in Myanmar. The protests have largely been leaderless, organised organically by individuals. 20,000 protestors took part in a street protest in Yangon against the coup d'état, calling for the release of Aung San Suu Kyi. Chants included "military dictator, fail, fail; democracy, win, win". Drivers honked their horns in support. Police cordoned off the protestors at the Insein Road–Hledan junction, preventing them from moving further. Workers from 14 trade unions participated in the protests. Livestreaming of the protests was attempted by mainstream media and citizen journalists but was limited by internet restrictions, estimated to have dropped to 16% by 14:00 local hour. Police water cannon trucks were set up in Hledan and police barricades were prepared in Sule. Protests spread to Mandalay and to the Pyinmana township of Naypyidaw on the afternoon of 6 February 2021. The Mandalay marches started at 13:00 local hour. Protestors continued on motorbikes at 16:00 in reaction to police restrictions. Police were in control by 18:00 local hour.

Many people protesting against the military coup on the main road in Kyaukse.

On 7 February 2021, public protests had grown in size and spread to other cities across the country. The largest protests in Yangon attracted at least 150,000 protesters, gathering at the Hledan junction and around Sule Pagoda in Downtown Yangon. Protesters have demanded the immediate release of Suu Kyi and Win Myint, chanting the slogan "our cause" (ဒို့အရေး), and calling for the fall of the dictatorship. Public protests were also organised across Upper Myanmar, including the cities of Naypyidaw, Mandalay, Bagan, Hpakhant, Lashio, Magwe, Mogok, and Pyin Oo Lwin, Taunggyi as well as Lower Myanmar, including the cities of Mawlamyaing, Dawei, Pathein, and Myaungmya, and Myawaddy.

On 8 February, protests continued to gain traction. In the national capital of Naypyidaw, riot police deployed water cannons on protesters to clear out the roads, becoming the first known use of water cannons since the protests began. In response to growing public pressure, state-run MRTV issued a warning that opposition to the junta was unlawful, and signalled a potential crackdown on protesters. Characterising the protests as "lawless", it stated that "legal action should be taken against acts that harm the stability of the state, public safety, and rule of law." That evening, martial law and a nightly curfew was impose in major cities and towns, including Yangon and Mandalay, effectively banning gatherings of more than five people.

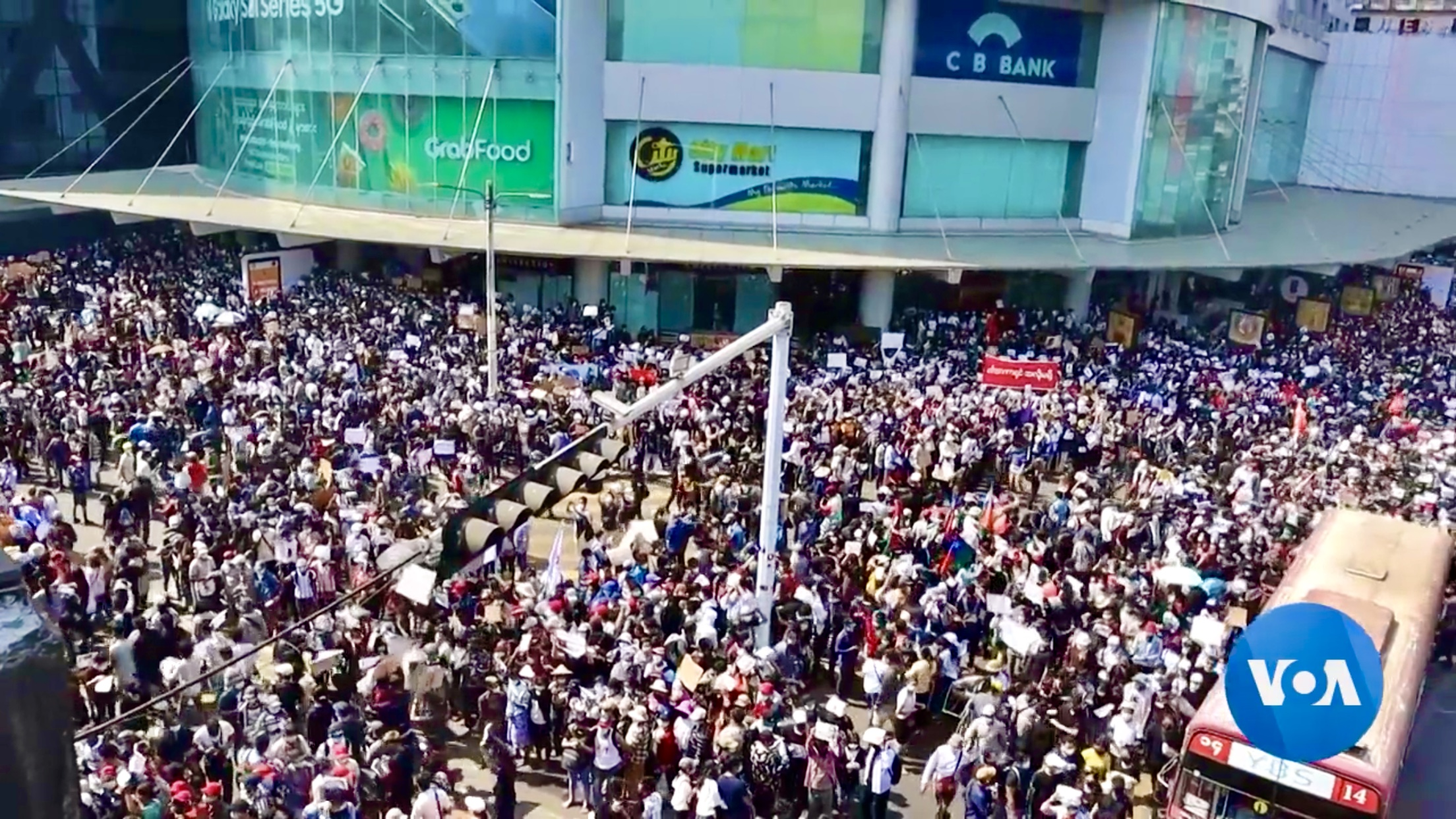
Thousands of protesters participate in an anti-military rally in Yangon's Hleden Junction.

On 9 February, protesters defied martial law, and continued to organise larger public protests across the country. Police began a crackdown of protests, firing live and rubber bullets, and using water cannons to disperse the crowds. Serious injuries prompted the United Nations office in Myanmar to issue a statement calling the use of disproportionate force against demonstrators unacceptable.

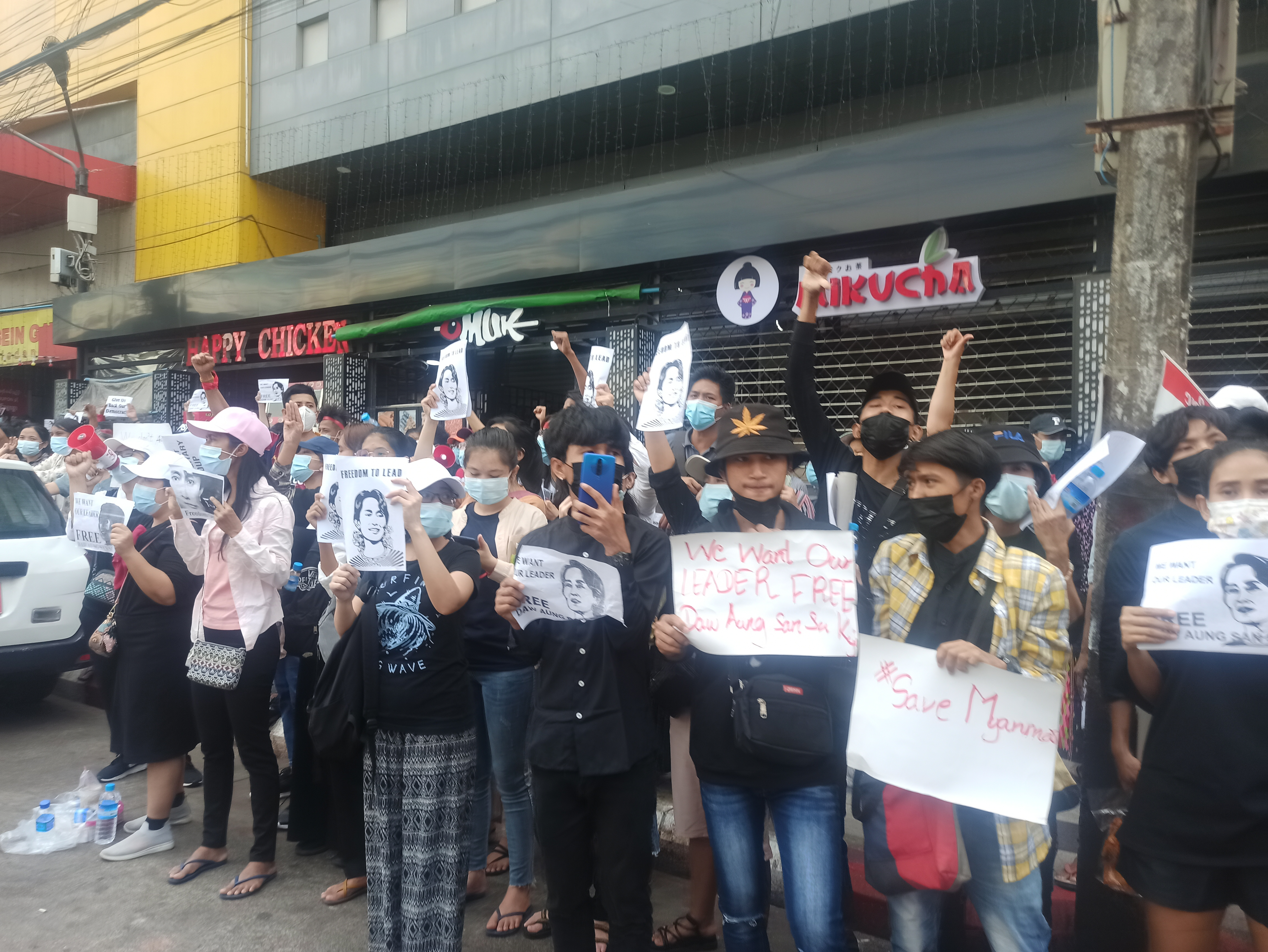
Demonstrators carrying placards with several hashtag slogans.

Several police officers in cities like Naypyidaw and Magwe have also begun defecting to the pro-democracy camp. On 9 February, Khun Aung Ko Ko, a Naypyidaw police officer, broke rank and joined protesters, becoming the first on-duty police officer to join the pro-democracy camp. Other officers who have tendered resignations have not been allowed to leave the police service. On 10 February, a police troop in Kayah State mutinied, denouncing the coup.

On 12 February 2021, The Union Day in Myanmar, junta's crackdown became intense and turns into violence, shots were fired and several people were arrested in Mawlamyine.

On 14 February 2021, hundreds had gathered at a power plant in Myitkyina that had become occupied by the military. Riot police and soldiers dispersed the crowds by firing shots and a water cannon. On 15 February, soldiers and police in Mandalay fired steel balls and slingshots at protesters who had gathered at the Myanma Economic Bank, urging bank employees to join the Civil Disobedience Movement. At least three protesters were injured.

On 15 February 2021, 100,000 protesters in Minbu, representing a diverse coalition of Hindus, Muslims, oilfield workers, and civil servants, gathered to protest the coup and demand the release of elected politicians.

On 19 February 2021, Mya Thwe Thwe Khine, a 19-year-old protester, becomes the first casualty of ongoing protests, after being shot in the head by security forces.

On 20 February 2021, volunteer medics onsite reported two people were killed and forty injured in a clash between police and demonstrators in Mandalay. According to witnesses on site the police fired live ammunition to suppress protesters and force workers back to their jobs.

==== Pro-military counter-protests ====
On 2 February 2021, the day after the coup, pro-military protesters and Burmese nationalist groups such as the Yeomanry Development Party (YDP) and Patriotic Myanmar Monks Network rallied in Yangon. On 8 February, a group of pro-military protesters rallied at Sule Pagoda.

On 9 February, a group of pro-military instigators arrived at a protest site in Yangon in 15 unmarked vehicles, seeking to provoke violence. Many brandished large wooden clubs, and were otherwise indistinguishable from pro-democracy protesters.

On 25 February, pro-military supporters marched through central Yangon. When they arrived at Sule Pagoda Road, where blockades were set up by the police force against peaceful protests, the police however removed the blockades and let them in. Afterwards some of pro-military protesters gathered at Yangon railway station and started marching. Civilians responded by banging pots and pans and crossing their wrists as symbols of resistance. Tensions arose when the pro-military supporters openly attacked bystanders, residents and anti-coup protestors using sharp objects, knives, heavy sticks and slingshots, wounding four people seriously in the head and the other eight in other parts of the body. Attacks were also directed against members of the press and cars.

== March ==
=== Tarmwe Arrest and North Okkalpa Crackdown ===
On 3 March 2021, more than 300 university students were arrested when they were marching along a main road. Police dispersed the march using tear gas and rubber bullets. They were released three weeks later, on 24 March. It was the day people staged the first silent strike. It was conjectured that the junta released the students intentionally on that day to discourage the relatives of the students from staying at home and participating in the silent strike.

On the same day, there was a crackdown in North Okkalapa Township in Northern Yangon. It was reported that several people were killed and more were wounded.

=== Death of Kyal Sin ===
On March 3, 2021, Kyal Sin, a 19-year-old taekwondo instructor, was killed in Mandalay, Myanmar's second largest city, when the police dispersed the protestors.

=== Sanchaung siege ===
On 8 March 2021, approximately two hundred protestors were besieged in Sanchaung, Yangon, as stun grenades and live ammunition were used by security forces, prompting calls from the United Nations and British Embassy in Myanmar asking security forces to withdraw. The protestors were able to leave at 6:30AM local time the following morning after security forces left the area.

=== Hlaingthaya massacre ===
On 14 March, Myanmar Army troops and Myanmar Police Force officers killed at least sixty-five civilians in the Yangon suburb of Hlaingthaya Township, later dubbed the Hlaingthaya massacre. The massacre prompted a mass exodus of thousands of residents and migrant workers back to their rural hometowns.

=== Armed Forces Day protests ===
On 27 March, the annual Armed Forces Day holiday, at least 107 were reported to have killed, with news outlet Myanmar Now reporting 114 deaths throughout the country, the highest death toll of any individual day. The event was seen as a reason for protestors to mobilise in opposition to security forces in Yangon and elsewhere in Myanmar, where these protests were then quelled by soldiers and police. The U.S. Embassy in Myanmar reported that shots were fired at its cultural center in Yangon, but no one was injured.

Earlier that day, the Myanmar military launched airstrikes on a village controlled by the ethnic army and the Karen National Union, which had earlier taken over an army post near the Myanmar–Thailand border, killing ten people including a lieutenant colonel with one of their own fighters killed, and capturing eight soldiers. In an interview, General Yawd Serk of the Restoration Council of Shan State/Shan State Army-South stated, "The Myanmar Armed Forces Day isn't an armed forces day, it's more like the day they killed people [and] if they continue to shoot at protesters and bully the people, I think all the ethnic groups would not just stand by and do nothing."

The European Union delegation to Myanmar has stated, "This 76th Myanmar armed forces day will stay engraved as a day of terror and dishonour," with U.S. Ambassador Thomas Vajda saying that "security forces are murdering unarmed civilians [and calling for] an immediate end to the violence and the restoration of the democratically elected government."

== April ==
=== Easter protest ===
As protests continued nationwide into the month of April, a candlelight vigil was held on 3 April and a protest consisting of Easter eggs with inscribed messages on them took place, despite Easter not being celebrated in largely Buddhist Myanmar. The messages inscribed on the eggs included "Spring Revolution", "We must win" and "Get out MAH" (referring to junta leader Min Aung Hlaing). Also on Easter, the AAPP said that the death toll from the crackdown on protests had risen to 557. In Naypyitaw, two men were killed when police opened fire on protesters in motorbikes while another man was killed earlier in the northern town of Bhamo. The protests also included a "Flower Strike" in which people laid flowers in public places in remembrance of those killed during the demonstrations and a "Silent Strike", in which people across the country left the streets deserted.

=== Clap day ===
On 5 April, peaceful protests continued in various parts of the country. At 5:00 p.m. local time (10:30 GMT), people clapped for five minutes in the streets to honor the ethnic minority armed groups confronting the junta and to honor protests of the Generation Z "defence youths [...] who are fighting in the revolution ... on behalf of us." Meanwhile, in Mandalay, people with placards showing the image of Aung San Suu Kyi took to the streets, to petition for international intervention. In response, the junta shut down wireless broadband services and mobile data services. In Yangon, protesters burned a Chinese flag in alleged response to China's stance before the United Nations Security Council held during a meeting a week prior.

=== Continuing anti-military protests ===
On 7 April, troops opened fire on protesters in Kale, killing five civilians. Two other protesters were killed in Bago, near Yangon, according to the outlet Myanmar Now. Separately, in Yangon, a Chinese-owned factory caught fire, allegedly set ablaze by protesters who also burned a Chinese flag, in repeated anti-Chinese arson attacks in the country. Foreign officials in the country also reported that the junta is "losing control" of the situation while the military accused the protesters of halting operations in hospitals, schools, roads, offices and factories. By the end of the day, the death toll had risen to 13, while several small explosions were heard in Yangon, including at government buildings, a military hospital and a shopping mall.

=== Bago massacre ===
On 9 April, Myanmar Army troops and Myanmar Police Force officers in the town of Bago killed at least eighty-two civilians. The deadly crackdown marked the single deadliest event since the February 2021 coup.

=== Continuing protests ===
April 6: protesters in Yangon spray the city red to oppose the recent crackdown on protests.

April 9: anti-government protesters clash with troops during marches in Taze and Bago.

April 13: protesters in many cities protested with flowers and carried banners as they marched against the military rule.

April 14: protesters have splashed red paint in the streets to symbolise the blood spilt and more than 700 lives lost in a brutal post-coup military crackdown.

April 15: protesters rally in towns early morning with flowers, protesting medical workers in Mandalay opened fire upon, one dead.

April 16: protesters with pots carried slogans during marches defying orders to stay home, and held flowers to honour those killed.

April 20: in Dawei, protesters attend sit-ins to honour the victims of the crackdowns.

April 23: mass protests in Yangon against an upcoming summit between coup-leader Min Aung Hlaing and Indonesia.

April 27: protests intensify in Dawei after one dead in protests in 3 cities against military rule.

== May ==
May 1: hundreds of anti-coup protesters rally with flowers in Yangon. Four are killed by gunfire. Flash protests and candlelit-vigils resume. Bomb blasts rocked Yangon.

May 2: seven killed as security forces open fire on thousands of protesters in Yangon. Vehicles were also said to have been set on fire, with reports of a blast outside of a police barracks. While Pope Francis called for peace, protests were also held outside of Myanmar in support of the anti-coup protests.

May 6: protesters march in Yangon against the military junta, chanting slogans in support of the civil disobedience movement. Students marched throughout Myanmar demonstrating the re-opening of schools.

May 7: Anti-coup protests were held on Friday across the country, including the city of Magway west of the capital, Naypyidaw. A pre-dawn strike was also held in the Natmouk district of Magway, with protesters carrying torches and the red banner of the National League of Democracy party of Aung San Suu Kyi. Young protesters also held “lightning strike” marches against the military in the Thamine and Thaketa districts of Yangon, while there have also been reports on social media of security forces carrying out a raid early on Friday in Yangon’s Hledan area. Authorities also detained several people, despite not having arrest warrants.

== October ==
=== Release prisoners ===
October 18: Myanmar’s military has announced plans to release more than 5,000 prisoners, days after Min Aung Hlaing was blocked from attending an upcoming ASEAN summit over the lack of progress made on a roadmap to restore peace in Myanmar.

A total of 5,600 people arrested or subject to arrest warrants for taking part in anti-coup protests since the military seized power in February would be released, it was announced on state TV on Monday.

== Casualties ==
Deaths of people per day since protests began, by date of injury, according to the AAPP. Casualties as of 11 April 2021:

Casualties by States and Regions (as of 11.4.2021) ≥200 100-199 50-99 10-49 1-9

The protests resulted in the deaths of several people. Witnesses and media reported 439 people by 10 April 2021, of whom 435 were protesters and four policemen.

- 9 February 2021: A 20-year-old woman was shot by police during a protest, and died at hospital ten days later.
- 20 February 2021: Two protesters were shot dead by soldiers, and a policeman was killed during confrontations.
- 28 February 2021: Eighteen protesters were reported to have been killed.
- 3 March 2021: Thirty-eight protesters were reported to have been shot dead in several cities.
- 8 March 2021: Three protesters were killed; two died from gunshot wounds to the head in Myitkyina, Kachin State while the other was killed during a protest in the town of Phyar Pon along the Irrawaddy Delta.
- 11 March 2021: Twelve protesters were killed, eight of whom were in the central town of Myaing, when security forces fired during protests.
- 13 March 2021: Twelve people were killed after soldiers opened fire against protesters in Mandalay, Yangon and Pyay.
- 14 March 2021: Between 74 and 90 anti-coup protesters were killed in several cities, most in Yangon during the Hlaingthaya massacre. A policeman was also killed.
- 15 March 2021: Twenty protesters were killed in Mandalay and in the central towns of Myingyan and Aunglan.
- 16 March 2021: Five protesters were killed when soldiers opened fire in Yangon and other cities.
- 17 March 2021: Nine protesters were reported killed, four of which died in the Kale Township.
- 18 March 2021: Three protesters were reportedly killed in Yangon, Monywa and Bago, while two policemen were killed during a confrontation between locals and police on a road between Thabyaygone and the village of Ti Taw.
- 19 March 2021: Ten protesters were killed by security forces, including nine in Aungban.
- 20 March 2021: Two protesters were shot and killed by soldiers in Mogok.
- 27 March 2021: Approximately 141 were killed across Myanmar on the annual Armed Forces Day holiday. Concurrently, Karen National Union fighters overran a military post, killing ten, after which a village controlled by the group was hit by military air strikes.
- 29 March 2021: Three protestors were killed in protests in Yangon, where security forces fired on protestors.
- 9 April 2021: Security forces killed at least 82 protesters in Bago with rifle grenades during the Bago massacre.
- As of 1 February 2022, at least 1500 people were killed in the protests.
