= Inthe =

- Village
- Location in Burma
- Coordinates: 22°46′N 94°5′E
- Country: Burma
- Region: Sagaing Region
- District: Kale District
- Township: Kale Township
- Time zone: UTC+6.30 (MST)

Inthe is a village in Kale Township, Kale District, in the Sagaing Region of western Myanmar.
