= Tat U Thida =

- Village
- Location in Burma
- Coordinates: 23°19′N 94°03′E
- Country: Burma
- Region: Sagaing Region
- District: Kale District
- Township: Kale Township
- Time zone: UTC+6.30 (MST)

Tat U Thida is a ward in Kalemyo, Kale District, in the Sagaing Region of western Burma.
