= Kokko (surname) =

Kokko is a Finnish surname. Notable people with the surname include:

- Aleksandr Kokko (born 1987), Soviet Union-born Finnish footballer
- Hanna Kokko (born 1971), Finnish biologist
- Nikke Kokko, Finnish ice hockey goaltender
- Petri Kokko (figure skater) (born 1966), former Finnish figure skater
- Petri Kokko (ice hockey) (born 1975), Finnish ice hockey player
- Petri Kokko (speedway rider), Finnish motorcycle speedway rider
- Väinö Kokko (1880–1943), Finnish politician
- Vesa Kokko, Finnish wheelchair curler and coach
- Yrjö Kokko (1903–1977), Finnish veterinarian and writer
