= Aung Mingalar =

Rohingya enclave in Sittwe, Myanmar

- Ghetto
- Country: Myanmar
- State: Rakhine State
- District: Sittwe District
- Township: Sittwe Township
- Ghetto isolation instituted: 2012

Population
  - Total: ~4,500 (2,015 est.)

Aung Mingalar is a segregated quarter in the city of Sittwe, Rakhine State, Myanmar, predominantly inhabited by the ethnic-Muslim Rohingya minority. After communal violence in 2012, Aung Mingalar became an isolated enclave, sealed by checkpoints and barricades, with severe restrictions on movement.

== Location ==
Aung Mingalar is located within downtown Sittwe in Arakan State. Prior to 2012, it was a mixed neighbourhood housing Rohingya and Rakhine families.

== History ==
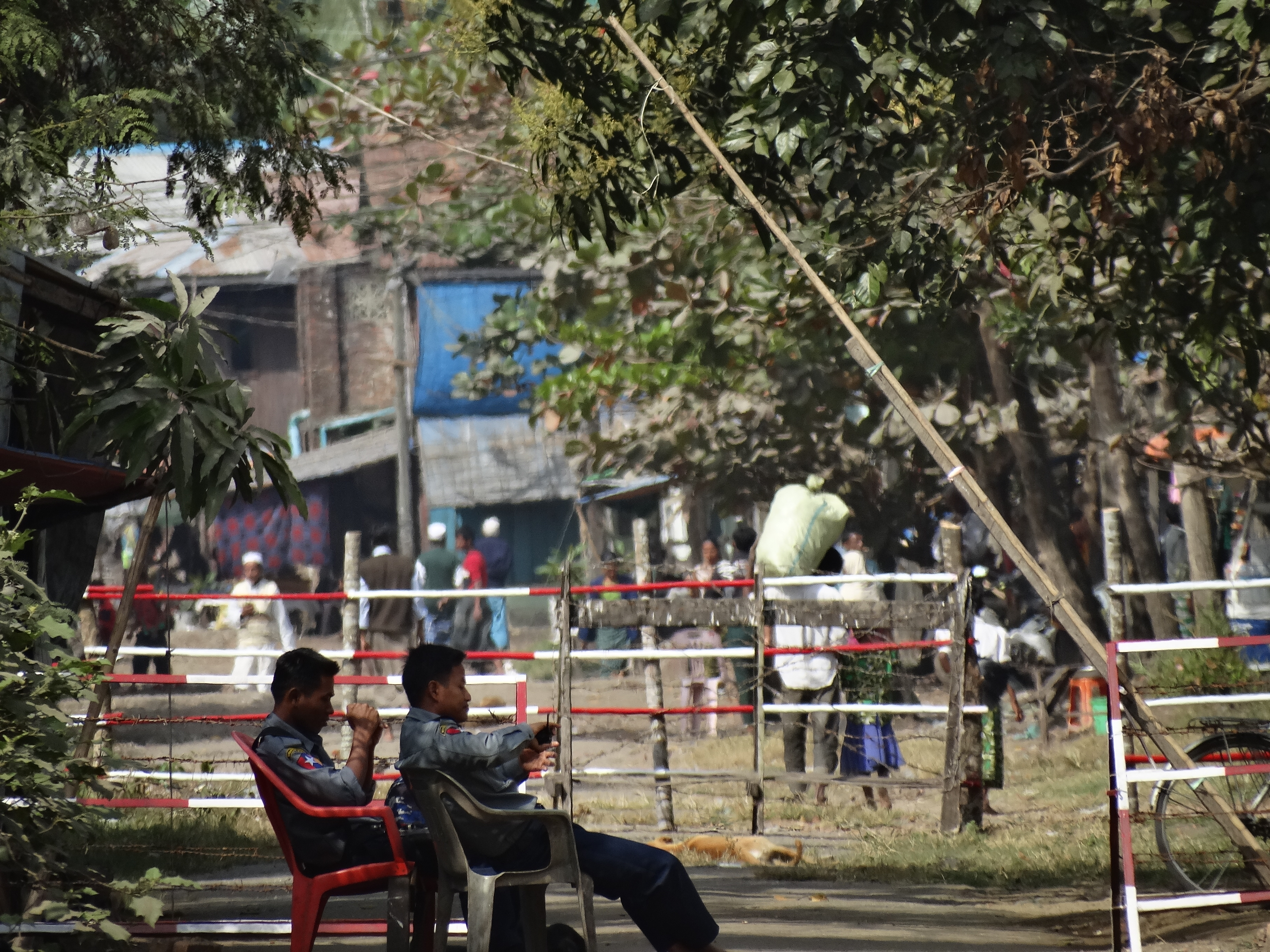
Police checkpoint next to Aung Mingalar in Sittwe with closed-off Rohingya Muslim area in the background.

Communal conflict broke out in Rakhine State in 2012 between ethnic Rakhine and Rohingya, leading to hundreds of deaths and the displacement of more than 100,000 people.

In the aftermath, security forces sealed Aung Mingalar with checkpoints and barricades, preventing the Rohingya residents from leaving without written permission.

== Living conditions ==
Human Rights Watch described Aung Mingalar as "a hell in a very small place," citing extreme segregation, fear, and lack of services. Analysts and rights groups have described the situation as resembling an apartheid-like system.

== See also ==
- Rohingya people
- Sittwe
- Rohingya conflict
