= Palatas =

Palatas is a surname. Notable people with the surname include:

- Cameron Palatas (born 1994), American actor
- Nick Palatas (born 1988), American actor, brother of Cameron

== See also ==
- Palata (disambiguation)
