= Ngapa, Central Sulawesi =

Ngapa
- Village
- Location within Sulawesi Location within Indonesia
- Coordinates: 0°40′39″S 119°49′34″E
- Country: Indonesia
- Province: Central Sulawesi
- Regency: Donggala

Ngapa is a village in Donggala Regency, in the province of Central Sulawesi in eastern Indonesia.
