= Yellow Ribbon Campaign of Myanmar =

Movement of lawyers

Yellow Ribbon Campaign of Myanmar 2015
- Date: 9 September 2015 – present
- Location: Online plus physical protests in various locals
- Caused by: appointment of military officers to positions in Judiciary Practice
- Goals: Short term- To oppose against the direct appointment of the person [who once served as an officer at the court, moved to 4 or 5 ministries, jumped across various levels] to the Deputy Director of Union. To protest against the appointment of military officers in various ministries. Long term-To eliminate the order type Court system in Judiciary Practice and to get a judicial system with democracy and Lawka Parla Truth. (Note: deterrent principles of shame and fear which guard the world from falling into chaos.)
- Methods: Website banners and various actions
- Motto: Say No to Military Interference in Judiciary Practice

The Yellow Ribbon Campaign of Myanmar is a movement of lawyers against the appointment of retired military officers to positions in Judiciary Practice in Myanmar (Burma) in September 2015. Yellow ribbon refers to the yellow badge of civil servants in Judiciary.

== Background ==
In August 2015, about 20 military officers were allowed to retire and appointed at positions as high as deputy directors in Supreme Court of Union at Naypyidaw. Some of them were appointed as Chief justices of High Court of State. The appointments are against the Civil Service Law signed by President Thein Sein.Tun Tun Oo, current Chief Justice of Supreme Court of Union, appointed by Thein Sein, is also a retired lieutenant colonel. Military officers were serving at high positions in judiciary since 1962 Ne Win's Coup. A normal civil servant has to try about 30 years to become a deputy director while it takes about 5 years for a military officer to get that position. A lawyer from Pyinmana Township Lawyers' Association commented on the case that the appointments will cause the judicial practice to be in military format.

I have experiences of Martial Law. Confessing to a charge is 3-year sentence and denying it is a 7-year one. No investigation is performed to decide whether a person is guilty or not.

— Hla Myo Myint, a lawyer

Most lawyers believe that the appointment of military officers whom the authorities trust is just appointing the obedient people in judiciary.

== Protests ==
We want a system where the right people take the right positions. They should be skilled in Judicial work. Our superintendent should be more qualified than we are. He or she must have enough working experience. It is absolutely impossible that a sergeant could memorise the penal code, pass the judge exam and become a judge. They should be in leading positions in their own fields. I rose through the ranks to become a credited lawyer and had to start my profession as a legal practice. Some of my peers are now colonels. But it would be impossible for me to take their positions. So military personnel also should not do so.

— Maung Maung Naing, a lawyer

On September 9, Pyinmanar lawyers started the Yellow Ribbon Campaign in front of the Court of Dekkhina Thiri District, Naypyidaw Council. Yellow Ribbon Campaign Myanmar Team urges the lawyers, judges, law students and other people who dislike the involvement of military officers in every field to wear Yellow Ribbons. Yellow Ribbon Movements were also performed in front of the courts in Pyay, Pyinmanar and Mawlamyaing on September 10. On September 11, in Yangon the lawyers launched the campaign at the office of lawyer U Aung Soe (the office of Myanmar Media Lawyers' Network) in 37th Road U Aye Myint, a lawyer from Pyay who was just released from the prison, protested to release the arrested 10-10-10 boycotting students and to drive out the military officers who were transferred to Supreme Court. U Khin Mg Zaw, the president of Pyinmanar Lawyers' Association, said,"We protest against the entry of people from military in all ministries of Burma including Health and Judiciary. We will continue until all the ribbon movements unite and spread to the whole country." He also said lawyers "want to become a rainbow ribbon campaign with every department coming out their own color". Yellow Ribbon Campaign will be performed by connecting with lawyers' associations all over the country, and Pyinmanar Lawyers' association, Myanmar Independent Lawyers' Association, Upper Myanmar Lawyers' network, Lower Myanmar Lawyers' Network, and Naypidaw Justice Aid Association are planning to make the campaign countrywide. Petitions against these appointments are collected and to be sent to the Office of the Union Attorney General. Pamphlets of Yellow Ribbon Campaign state that they were trying to stop militarization of Judiciary which they found as strengthening of the military with purpose to prepare for the periods beyond 2015. The Asian Human Rights Commission on Thursday issued a statement, calling for an end to the practice of appointing military officers as judges by changing the country's constitution to state that only those with legal qualifications and professional experience can become judges of the Supreme Court and other courts. The AHRC also urged international human rights organisations to take an active part in supporting the yellow ribbon movement.

The movement spread to Taunggyi,Shan State in September 15. On 19 September, about 20 lawyers protested wearing yellow ribbons in Lashio, North Shan State, confirming that they protest until the appointed military officers in judiciary resign. 88 generation Students' leader Min Ko Naing fully supported the ribbon campaigns including the yellow one. On 17 September, lawyers from Sittwe, Rakhine State protested wearing yellow ribbons in Sittwe township and district courts, and this movement would be performed for a month. Not only the lawyers but also the judges and civil servants join the campaign.

== Governmental response ==
In Naypyidaw, there are about 20 campaign leaders and 100 members who perform Yellow Ribbon Campaign. On September 11, a total of 15 police and military security servants were waiting in front of Zumbu Thiri Court in Naypyidaw council according to the news that lawyers would perform Yellow Ribbon Movement.

Civil servants from the court informed the protesters that there were plans to arrest the campaigners.

== See also ==
- Black Ribbon Campaign of Myanmar
