= Thayettaw, Sagaing =

Thayettaw သရက်တော
- Village
- Location in Myanamr
- Coordinates: 22°42′N 94°5′E
- Country: Myanmar
- Region: Sagaing Region
- District: Kale District
- Township: Kale Township
- Time zone: UTC+6.30 (MST)

Thayettaw (Burmese: သရက်တော) is a village in Kale Township, Kale District, in the Sagaing Region of western Myanmar.
