= Ngapa, Southeast Sulawesi =

Ngapa
- Town
- Location within Sulawesi Location within Indonesia
- Coordinates: 03°18′48″S 120°59′35″E
- Country: Indonesia
- Province: Southeast Sulawesi
- Regency: North Kolaka Regency
- Time zone: UTC+8 (ICST)
- Postcode: 93958
- Area code: (+62) 405
- Villages: 12

Ngapa is a town in North Kolaka Regency, in the province of Southeast Sulawesi in eastern Indonesia.

== Administrative villages ==
Ngapa consists of 12 villages (Kelurahan or Desa) namely:

- Beringin
- Koreiha
- Lapai
- Lawolatu
- Mataiwoi
- Ngapa
- Nimbuneha
- Padaelo
- Paruttelang
- Puurau
- Tadaumere
- Watumotaha
