= Death of Khant Nyar Hein =

Martyred student

Khant Nyar Hein
- ခန့်ညားဟိန်း
- Born: Khant Nyar Hein; 2003 or 2004; Yangon, Myanmar
- Died: 14 March 2021 (aged 17); Tamwe Township, Yangon, Myanmar
- Other name: Lin Yaozong
- Occupation: The Martyr of Myanmar's Democracy
- Parents: Thein Zaw (father); Kyu Thin (mother)

Khant Nyar Hein (Burmese: ခန့်ညားဟိန်း; 2003/2004 — 14 March 2021), also known as Lin Yaozong (Chinese: 林耀宗), was a Burmese medical student and activist. He was killed during the 2021 Myanmar protests. Khant Nyar Hein became an icon of the anti-coup protest movement after his death. He is remembered as a martyr of Myanmar's democracy.

== Early life ==
Khant Nyar Hein was born in 2003 in Latha Township, Yangon, Myanmar into a Burmese-Chinese family. He completed his primary and secondary education at Basic Education High School No. 1 Dagon. At the time of his death, he was a first-year student at University of Medicine 1, Yangon.

== Protest and death ==
During anti-coup protests in Tamwe Township, he was shot in the head by security forces on 14 March 2021, the bloodiest day until that date during the protests. Citizen video shows police approaching his body, beating up and arresting a young girl who was trying to help him, then later dragging his body away.

"Please don’t hate Chinese in Myanmar. We were born here", Khant Nyar Hein's mother appealed to the people of Myanmar shortly after her son was shot dead by police. Speaking in fluent Mandarin, she called on the Chinese government to hear their pleas. Hundreds of young mourners spilled out on to the street at the funeral of Khant Nyar Hein. Members of the medical community held up the three finger salute at the funeral.

== Legacy ==
Video of the police's brutal handling of his body in the minutes following the shooting quickly spread on social media and he has become something of an icon for supporters of the pro-democracy movement around the world.
