= Mawlaik, Kale =

Mawlaik မော်လိုက်
- Village
- Location within Myanmar
- Coordinates: 23°17′N 94°5′E
- Country: Myanmar
- Region: Sagaing Region
- District: Kale District
- Township: Mawlaik Township
- Elevation: 128 m (420 ft)

Population (2019)
  - Village: 15,230
  - Urban: 8,450
  - Rural: 6,780
- Time zone: UTC+6:30 (MMT)
- Postal code: 03051

Mawlaik is a village in Kale Township, Kale District, in the Sagaing Region of western Myanmar.
