= Petri Kokko (ice hockey) =

Finnish ice hockey player

- Born: February 1, 1975 (age 50) Oulu, FIN
- Height: 5 ft 10.5 in (179 cm)
- Weight: 178 lb (81 kg; 12 st 10 lb)
- Position: Defence
- Shoots: Left
- Elitserien team Former teams: HC Energie Karlovy Vary; Ilves; SaiPa; Timrå IK; Espoo Blues; Brynäs IF
- Playing career: 1993–present

Petri Kokko (born February 1, 1975, in Oulu, Finland) is a professional ice hockey defenceman playing for the HC Energie Karlovy Vary hockey team.

== Career statistics ==
			Regular season					Playoffs
Season	Team	League	GP	G	A	Pts	PIM	GP	G	A	Pts	PIM
1990–91	Oulun Kärpät U20	Jr. A SM-sarja	2	0	0	0	0	—	—	—	—	—
1991–92	Oulun Kärpät U20	Jr. A SM-sarja	—	—	—	—	—	—	—	—	—	—
1992–93	Oulun Kärpät U20	U20 SM-liiga	32	4	13	17	46	—	—	—	—	—
1993–94	Oulun Kärpät U20	U20 SM-liiga	1	0	0	0	0	—	—	—	—	—
1993–94	Oulun Kärpät	I-Divisioona	32	3	6	9	26	—	—	—	—	—
1993–94	Ilves U20	U20 SM-liiga	8	1	2	3	20	1	0	0	0	4
1993–94	Ilves	SM-liiga	8	0	0	0	6	4	0	0	0	4
1994–95	Ilves U20	U20 SM-liiga	1	0	2	2	2	2	0	0	0	0
1994–95	Ilves	SM-liiga	44	6	7	13	46	—	—	—	—	—
1995–96	Ilves U20	U20 SM-liiga	—	—	—	—	—	—	—	—	—	—
1995–96	Ilves	SM-liiga	45	1	6	7	61	3	1	0	1	2
1996–97	Team Kiruna IF	Division 1	42	6	7	13	32	—	—	—	—	—
1997–98	SaiPa	SM-liiga	48	3	5	8	28	3	0	0	0	0
1998–99	SaiPa	SM-liiga	51	3	4	7	20	7	0	1	1	8
1999–00	Tingsryds AIF	HockeyAllsvenskan	45	15	19	34	89	3	0	1	1	2
2000–01	SaiPa	SM-liiga	52	6	11	17	34	—	—	—	—	—
2001–02	SaiPa	SM-liiga	49	7	16	23	38	—	—	—	—	—
2002–03	SaiPa	SM-liiga	55	2	15	17	46	—	—	—	—	—
2003–04	SaiPa	SM-liiga	53	7	25	32	50	—	—	—	—	—
2003–04	SC Rapperswil-Jona	NLA	—	—	—	—	—	—	—	—	—	—
2004–05	SaiPa	SM-liiga	56	5	28	33	40	—	—	—	—	—
2005–06	SaiPa	SM-liiga	49	6	20	26	73	8	0	2	2	6
2006–07	Timrå IK	Elitserien	51	2	12	14	52	7	0	2	2	6
2007–08	Timrå IK	Elitserien	55	4	18	22	70	11	2	6	8	10
2008–09	Espoo Blues	SM-liiga	39	2	14	16	26	14	3	6	9	10
2009–10	Espoo Blues	SM-liiga	12	1	3	4	12	—	—	—	—	—
2000–01	Brynäs IF	Elitserien	8	1	5	6	6	—	—	—	—	—
2010–11	HC Energie Karlovy Vary	Czech	46	4	2	6	30	—	—	—	—	—
SM-liiga totals			561	49	154	203	480	46	6	9	15	32
