= Kale Township =

- Township
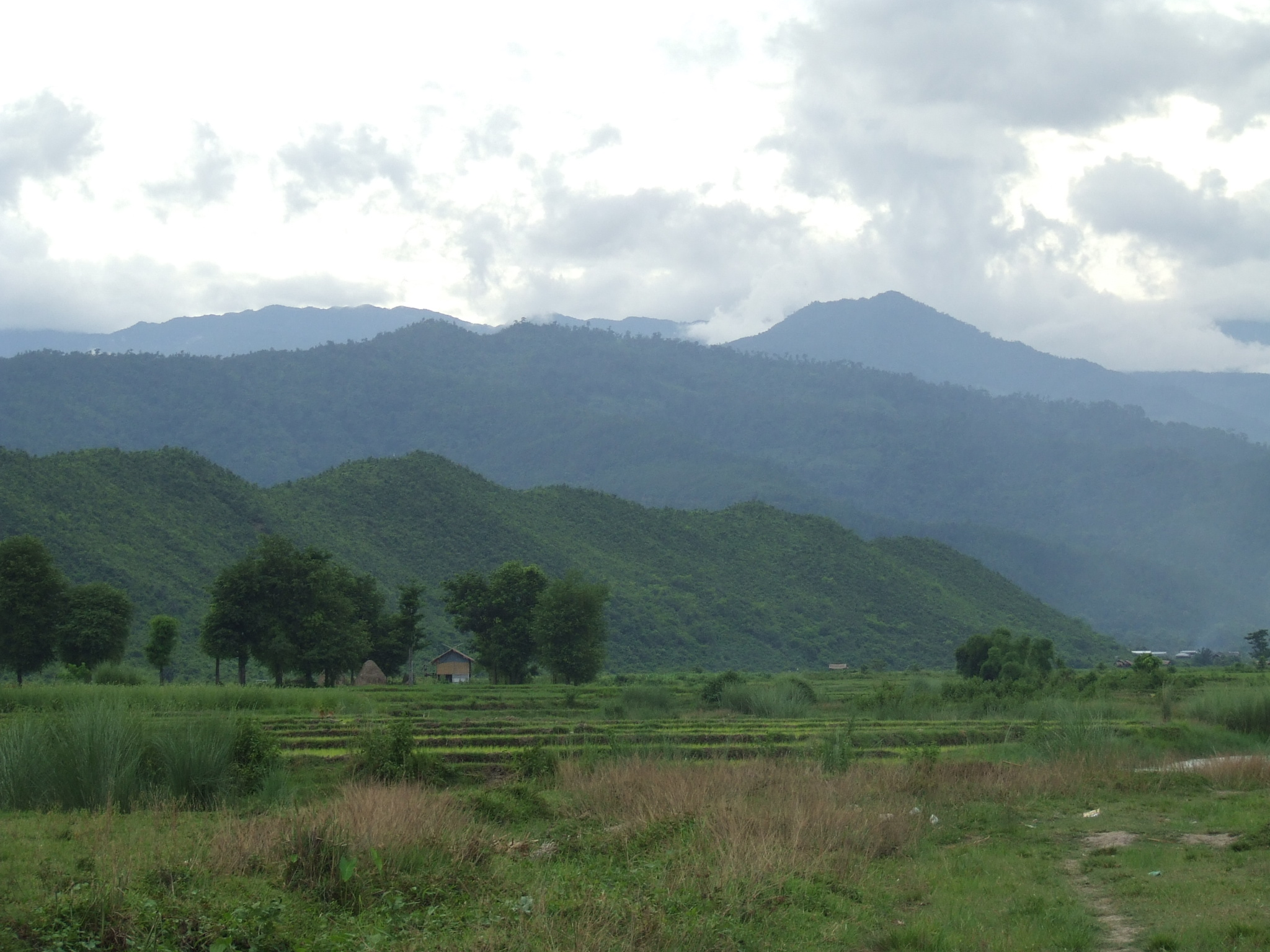

- Location in Kale district

- Location in Burma
- Coordinates: 23°11′N 94°3′E
- Country: Burma
- Region: Sagaing Region
- District: Kale District
- Capital: Kalay

Area
  - Total: 2,337.74 km^{2} (902.61 sq mi)

Population (2014)
  - Total: 509,368
  - Density: 217.889/km^{2} (564.330/sq mi)
- Time zone: UTC+6.30 (MST)

Kale Township is a township in Kale District in the Sagaing Division of Burma (Myanmar). The principal town is Kalay.

Location in Sagaing region

== Geography and borders ==
Kale Township runs north–south along the Kale Valley in which lie the south flowing Neyinzaya River and the north flowing Myittha River which meet near the administrative seat of Kalemyo and flow east toward the Chindwin River. It is bounded approximately within coordinates of 22° 36´ and 23° 38´ north latitudes and between 93° 58´ and 94° 16´ east longitudes. On the west it is bounded by the foothills of the Chin Hills and on the east by the Mwegyi Mountain Range. The area of the township is 902.606 square miles (2,337.74 km^{2}).

Kale Township is surrounded by the townships of:

- Tonzang of Chin State and Mawlaik to the north;
- Kalewa and Mingin on the east;
- Gangaw to the south; and
- Hakha, Falam, Tiddim and Tonzang of Chin State to the west.

== Towns and villages ==
Ah Shey See, Aung Min Ga Lar, Aung Myay Man, Aung Thit Sar, Aung Zaya, Bogon, Bogyi, Ce Kan, Chan Myayt Aung Si, Chaunggyauk, Chaunggyin, Gyo Thone Pin, Haka, Hlaing Thar Yar, Hmunlai, Hnawgon, Honnaing, Hpaungzeik, Htauk Kyant, Htoma Myauk, Inbaung, Indainggale, In Daing Kone, Indainggyi, Indin, Ingyaw, Ingyun, Insein, Inthe, Kalemyo, Kanbale, Kangyi, Kantha, Khon Doe Myo Thar, Khon Thar, Kinmungyon, Kokko, Kondo, Kyaukka, Kyaukpyok, Kyaung Taik, Kyawywa, Kyetpanet, Kyigon, Lamaing, Legyi, Letpanchaung, Manda, Mauk Lin, Mawlaik, Mingalar U Yin, Myauk See, Myogyigon, Myohla, Myo Thar, Nanhannwe, Nankyisaung, Nansaungpu, Nanzalu, Natchaung, Nat-in, Natkyigon, Nat Gyi Kone (Pyin Khon Lay), Natmyaung, Natnan, Ngar Hpar, Nyaung Pin Thar, Nwa, Okkan, Palata Sakan, Pauk Taw, Pinlon, Pyin Khone Gyi, Pyin Taw U, Sa Khan Gyi, Sanmyo, Saw Bwar Yae Shin, Segyi, Shabo, Sibin, Sin, Sihaung Ashe, Sihaung Myauk, Sihaung Taung, Sinywa, Siyin, Taung See, Taung-u, Tahan, Tat U Thida, Taung Phi Lar, Taung Zalat, Thayagon, Thayettaw, Thazi, Thazin, Thekondan, Tin Thar, Udu, Uyin, Yar Za Gyo, Yenatha, Yeshin, Ywar Thar, Zingalaing, Kyar Inn, Kyun Chaung, San Tha
