= Myittha River =

River in Myanmar

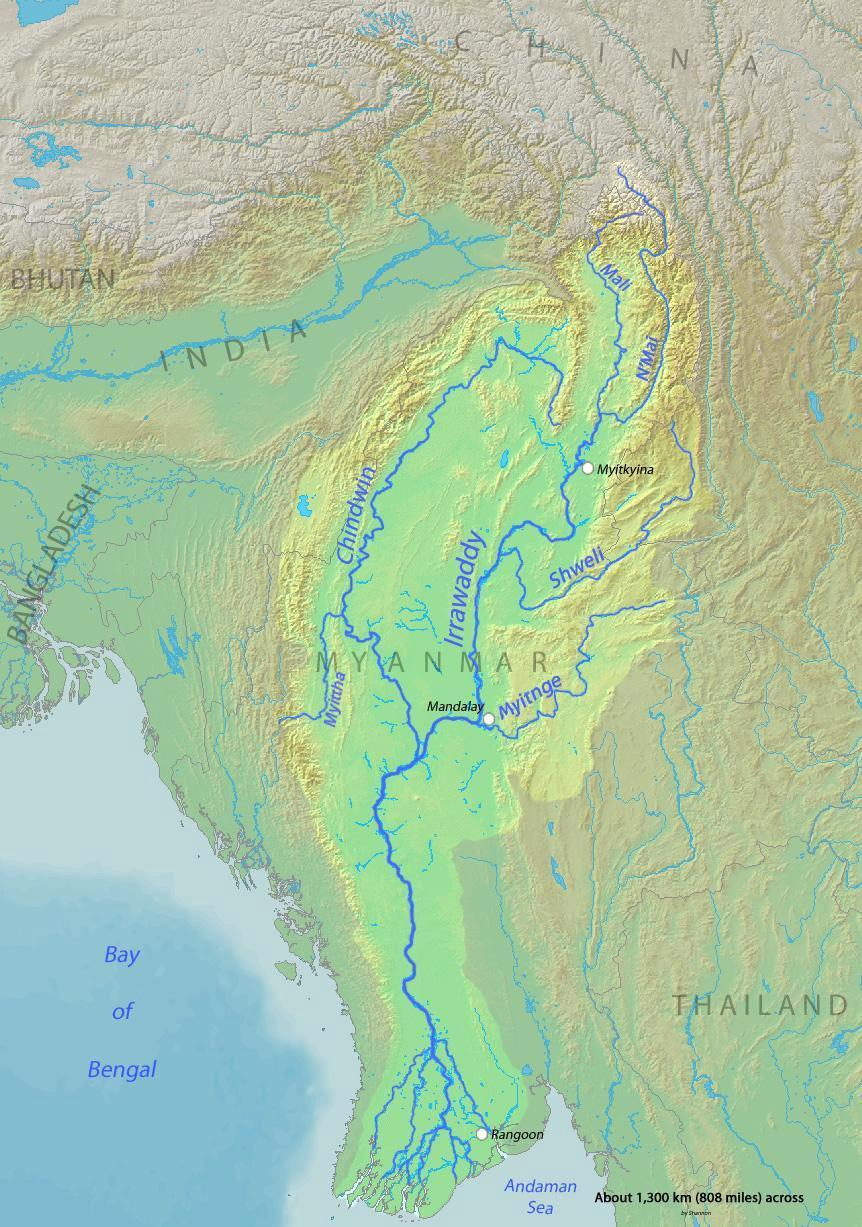
- Native name: မြစ်သာမြစ် (Burmese)

Location
- Country: Burma

Physical characteristics
- Source
  - location: Burma
- Mouth
  - location: Chindwin
  - coordinates: 23°12′26″N 94°19′53″E

Basin features
- Tributaries
  - left: Manipur River

Myittha River (Burmese: မြစ်သာမြစ်) is a river of western Burma, a tributary of the Chindwin River. It is one the two main tributaries of the Chindwin River system, along with the Uyu.

== Course ==
The Myittha originates in the Chin Hills and flowing northwards drains the Kale Valley. It flows into the Chindwin, one of the main tributaries of the Irrawaddy River, on the right just below the town of Kalewa.

== See also ==
- List of rivers of Burma
