= Kalay =

Kalay ကလေး
- Town
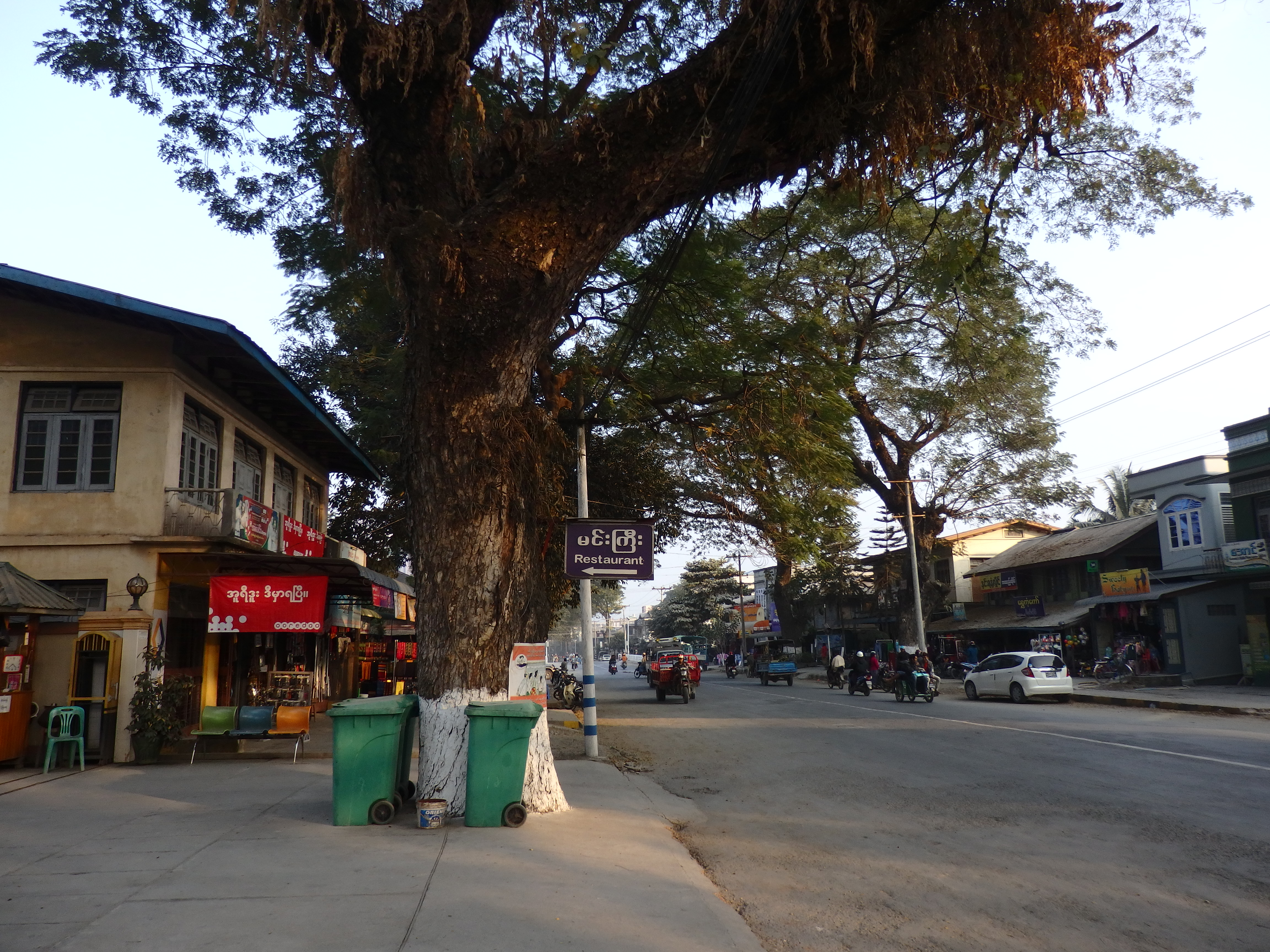

- Location in Myanmar
- Coordinates: 23°11′40″N 94°01′25″E
- Country: Myanmar
- Region: Sagaing Region
- District: Kalay District
- Township: Kalay Township
- Founded: 3 February 966 AD

Area
  - Total: 2,337.74 km^{2} (902.61 sq mi)
- Elevation: 140 m (460 ft)

Population
  - Total: 348,573
  - Density: 149.107/km^{2} (386.185/sq mi)
- Time zone: UTC+6.30 (MST)

Kalay (Burmese: ကလေး), also known as Kale, is one of the largest towns in the Sagaing Region of Myanmar. It is located upstream from Mandalay and Monywa on the Myittha River, a tributary of the Chindwin River. The town is the district headquarters of the Kalay District. It has gained importance with trans border movement enabled between Myanmar and India following the 165 kilometres (103 mi) Tamu–Kalay section of India–Myanmar–Thailand Trilateral Highway built by the Border Roads Organization of India under the Look-East Connectivity policy. Consequently, Kalay is now one of the fastest developing towns in Myanmar.

== Etymology ==
The earlier name of the town ‘Karlaymyo,’ renamed now as ‘Kalaymyo,’ means “a town surrounded by four satellite towns” in the Burmese language. "Kalaymyo" means "town of children" in Burmese.

== History ==
According to tradition, Kalay was established as a town on 3 February 966 (Sunday, the 5th of waning of Tabodwe 328 ME). A votive tablet unearthed in Kalay in 1983, with a Mon language by ညောင်ဦး စောရဟန်း the first ruler was his son, the inscription, refers to the "Aniruddha, the Great King".

Kale was an independent Shan state between the 14th–16th centuries.

During the Second World War, Kalay was an important regrouping point for the British during their retreat from Burma in 1942 because of the relatively easier access to India along the Manipur River (the alternative was to march through malarial forests from Kalewa to Tamu).

On 19 September 2007, 200 monks marched through the streets of Kalay as a part of the 2007 Burmese anti-government protests. Over the next few days, the monks were joined by thousands of people of the Chin ethnic group. On 24 September, students marched from Kalay University with posters and protested, demanding the release of Aung San Suu Kyi and two other political prisoners.

In July 2015, a monsoon rain triggered a natural disaster, and a state of emergency was declared in four regions of the country. The disaster caused a flash flood in Kalay and surrounding areas. Kalay was devastated by the disaster.

== Saophas ==
- Sao Yawt Hkam 966 – 999
- Sao Han Möng 999 – 1021 younger brother of Sao Yawt Hkam
- Sokkate 1021 – 1038 son of Sao Yawt Hkam + Mahadewi Htip Phaya Hseng Pan daughter of Sao Han Möng
- Sao Paw Inn 1038 – 1066 son
- Hso Min Chay 1066 – 1100 son
- Min Chay-Hung 1100 – 1126 son
- Min Chay-Hkum 1126 – 1147 son
- Moe Min Chay 1147 – 1170 son
- Min Chay-Gan 1170 – 1197 son
- Min Chay-Htan 1197 – 1218 son
- Min Chay-Hkaan 1218 – 1236 son
- Min Chay-Fang 1236 – 1270 son
- Min Chay-Hueng 1270 – 1288 son
- Nga Min-Chay 1288 – 1326 nephew
- Min Chay-Htao 1326 – 1378 son
- Min Chay-To-In 1378 – 1406 younger brother
- Anawrahta of Launggyet (Gamani) c. 1406 – c. December 1406
- Hso Kyaing Hpa c. December 1406 – November 1425 son of Hso Htan Hpa
- Shan Say Hu 1425 – 1439 son
- Thiri Zeya Thura of Taungdwin 1439 – 1450/51
- Kaung Loi Hpa 1450/51 – 1458/59 son of Shan Say Hu
- Hso Loum Hpa 1458/59 – 1480 son
- Hso Kawt Hpa 1480–1486 son
- Hso Hkawng Hpa 1486 – 1510 son
- Hso Hken Hpa 1510 – 1531 son

(He has one daughter Sao Thiri Mala born from Mahadewi Sao Hkam Long and one son Hso Hkaing Hpa and one daughter Sao Ke Youn born from Sao Hkam Loun, both his wives were Hso Hkawng Hpa's daughters, Hso Hkaing Hpa died of smallpox, and his two daughters married Hso Kert Hpa the son of Sao Hkun Mawng from Hsipaw)

- Hso Kert Hpa 1531 – 1545 son of Sao Hkun Mawng from Hsipaw
- Hso Moe Hpa 1545 – 1588 son
- Hso Gam Hpa 1588 – 1615 son
- Hso Yaam Hpa 1615 – 1631 son
- Hso Htaan Hpa 1631 – 1666 son
- Hso Hkai Hpa 1666 – 1690 son
- Hso Gern Hpa 1690 – 1713 son
- Hso Nyue Hpa 1713 – 1726 younger brother
- Hso Kyuang Hpa 1726 – 1750 son
- Hso Hke Hpa 1750–1780 son
- Hso Wen Hpa 1780–1806 son
- Hso Hai Hpa 1806 – 1834 son
- Hso Kawn Hpa 1834 – 1856 son
- Hso Lip Hpa 1856 – 1878 son
- Hso Fa Hpa 1878 – 1926 son
- Hso Ai Hpa 1926 – 1942 younger brother
- Hso Hub Hpa 1942 – 1948 (last) son

== Geography ==
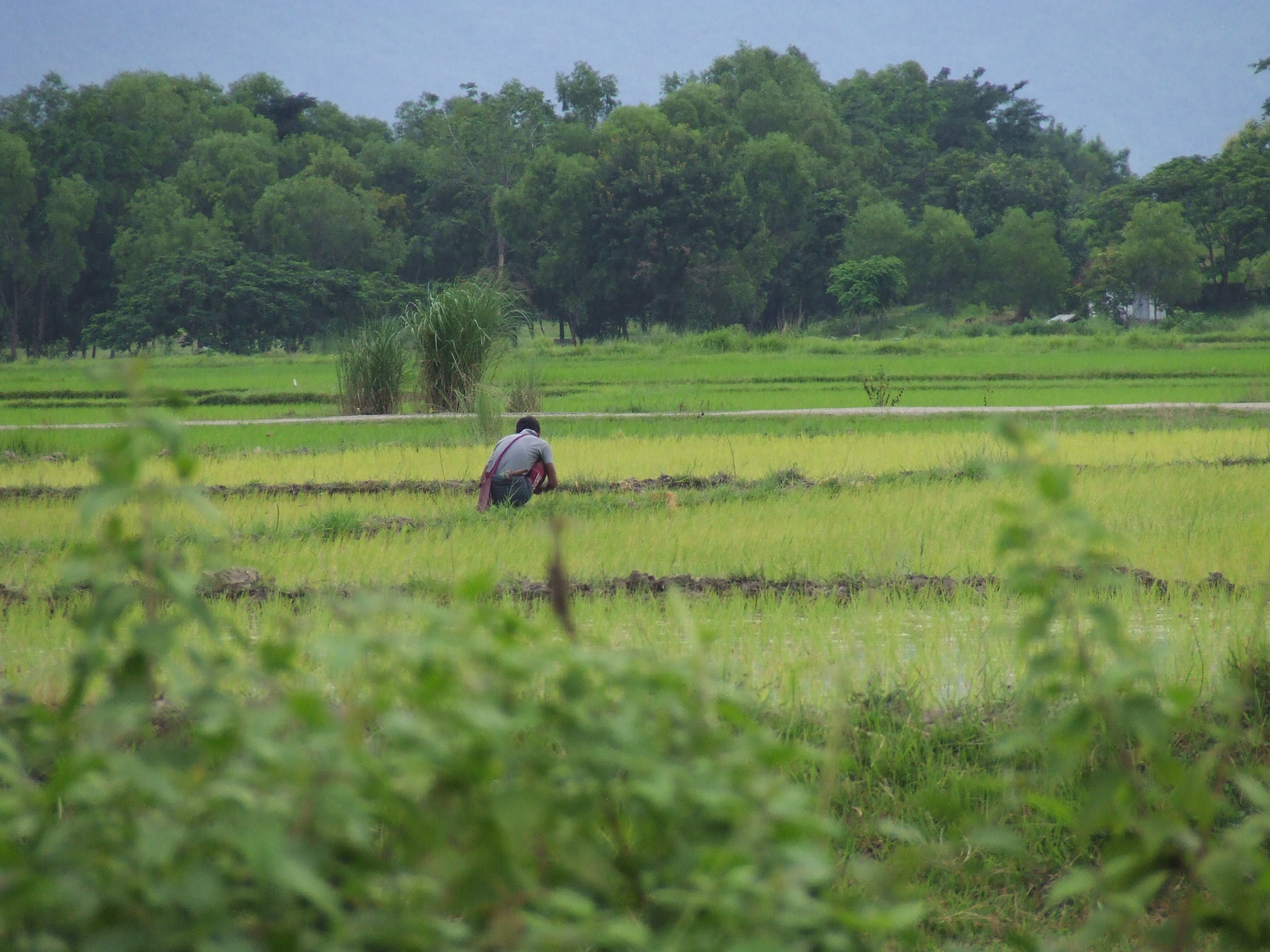
Agricultural field in Kalay

Geographically, the distinctive feature of the town is that the Tropic of Cancer passes through it. This point has been marked by the milepost 55/56 near Kyansitgon village. Set in terrain that has an average elevation of 450 feet (140 m) above mean sea level, the town has a picturesque backdrop of the Laytha Hill in the east and the Chin Hills in the west.

The city is drained by the Myittha River that flows in a south–north direction, the Nayyinzaya River that flows in a north–south direction, and the Manipura River (also called the Nunkathe River) from across the international border with India; the last-named river has its origin in Manipur state of the north-east India.

=== Climate ===
A tropical savanna climate (Köppen Aw) dominates the town. Temperature variations are significant, with summer months from March to May recording 100–112 °F (38–44 °C) and the winter months in the range of 55–80 °F (13–27 °C). The average annual temperature is reported to be 79 °F (26 °C). The average annual rainfall is of the order of 67.77 inches (172.1 cm).

Climate data for Kalay (1991–2020)
Month	Jan	Feb	Mar	Apr	May	Jun	Jul	Aug	Sep	Oct	Nov	Dec	Year
Record high °C (°F)	32.5 (90.5)	38.8 (101.8)	42.1 (107.8)	42.6 (108.7)	43.7 (110.7)	39.0 (102.2)	38.6 (101.5)	38.5 (101.3)	37.3 (99.1)	36.0 (96.8)	33.8 (92.8)	31.6 (88.9)	43.7 (110.7)
Mean daily maximum °C (°F)	25.9 (78.6)	29.8 (85.6)	34.6 (94.3)	37.3 (99.1)	36.0 (96.8)	33.6 (92.5)	32.7 (90.9)	32.2 (90.0)	31.9 (89.4)	31.1 (88.0)	28.6 (83.5)	25.6 (78.1)	31.6 (88.9)
Daily mean °C (°F)	19.5 (67.1)	22.2 (72.0)	26.1 (79.0)	29.6 (85.3)	30.1 (86.2)	29.3 (84.7)	28.9 (84.0)	28.5 (83.3)	28.0 (82.4)	26.9 (80.4)	23.7 (74.7)	20.2 (68.4)	26.1 (79.0)
Mean daily minimum °C (°F)	13.2 (55.8)	14.5 (58.1)	17.6 (63.7)	21.9 (71.4)	24.2 (75.6)	25.0 (77.0)	25.0 (77.0)	24.8 (76.6)	24.1 (75.4)	22.7 (72.9)	18.9 (66.0)	14.8 (58.6)	20.6 (69.1)
Record low °C (°F)	6.0 (42.8)	6.7 (44.1)	8.6 (47.5)	14.7 (58.5)	18.8 (65.8)	22.0 (71.6)	23.0 (73.4)	22.6 (72.7)	20.5 (68.9)	17.7 (63.9)	11.5 (52.7)	9.1 (48.4)	6.0 (42.8)
Average precipitation mm (inches)	4.4 (0.17)	3.7 (0.15)	12.2 (0.48)	31.9 (1.26)	162.8 (6.41)	244.7 (9.63)	272.6 (10.73)	292.2 (11.50)	333.2 (13.12)	210.1 (8.27)	27.9 (1.10)	4.9 (0.19)	1,600.7 (63.02)
Average precipitation days (≥ 1.0 mm)	0.6	0.7	1.6	4.1	10.8	15.8	18.0	18.2	14.8	11.0	3.0	1.0	99.7
Source 1: World Meteorological Organization
Source 2: Norwegian Meteorological Institute (extremes)

== Demographics ==
The population of Kalay is estimated to be 400,000, comprising 55% Bamar, 35% Chin and 10% other nationalities and foreigners. The valley town, with its tranquil atmosphere, is inhabited in equal numbers by the Chin community and Bamars. The original settlers are Shans.

== Administration ==
Kalaymyo is an administrative town of Kalay District, Sagaing Division, Myanmar. The General Administration Department(GAD), within the Ministry of the Office of the Union Government, forms the main administration organization within township and wards. From administrators at the ward and village tract level to the Union level, GAD’s responsibilities range from tax collection to administration of land management to myriad registration and certification processes. Besides, the Military Headquarter of Regional Administration, No(10) Military Operation Management Headquarter, and over 10 battalions and military units are also situated in Kalaymyo. Kalay township consists of nineteen wards, forty-one village tracts, one hundred and fifty-six villages.

- Nyaung Pin Thar
- Mingalar U Win
- Aung Mingalar
- Aung Myay Man
- Aung Thit Sar
- Aung Zaya
- Pin Lon
- Chan Myae Aung Si
- Tat U Thida
- Thazin
- Tahan
- San Myo
- Taung Phi La
- Taung Zalat
- Gyo Thone Pin
- Hlaing Thar Yar
- Myo Hla
- In Daing Kone
- Myo Thar

== Education ==
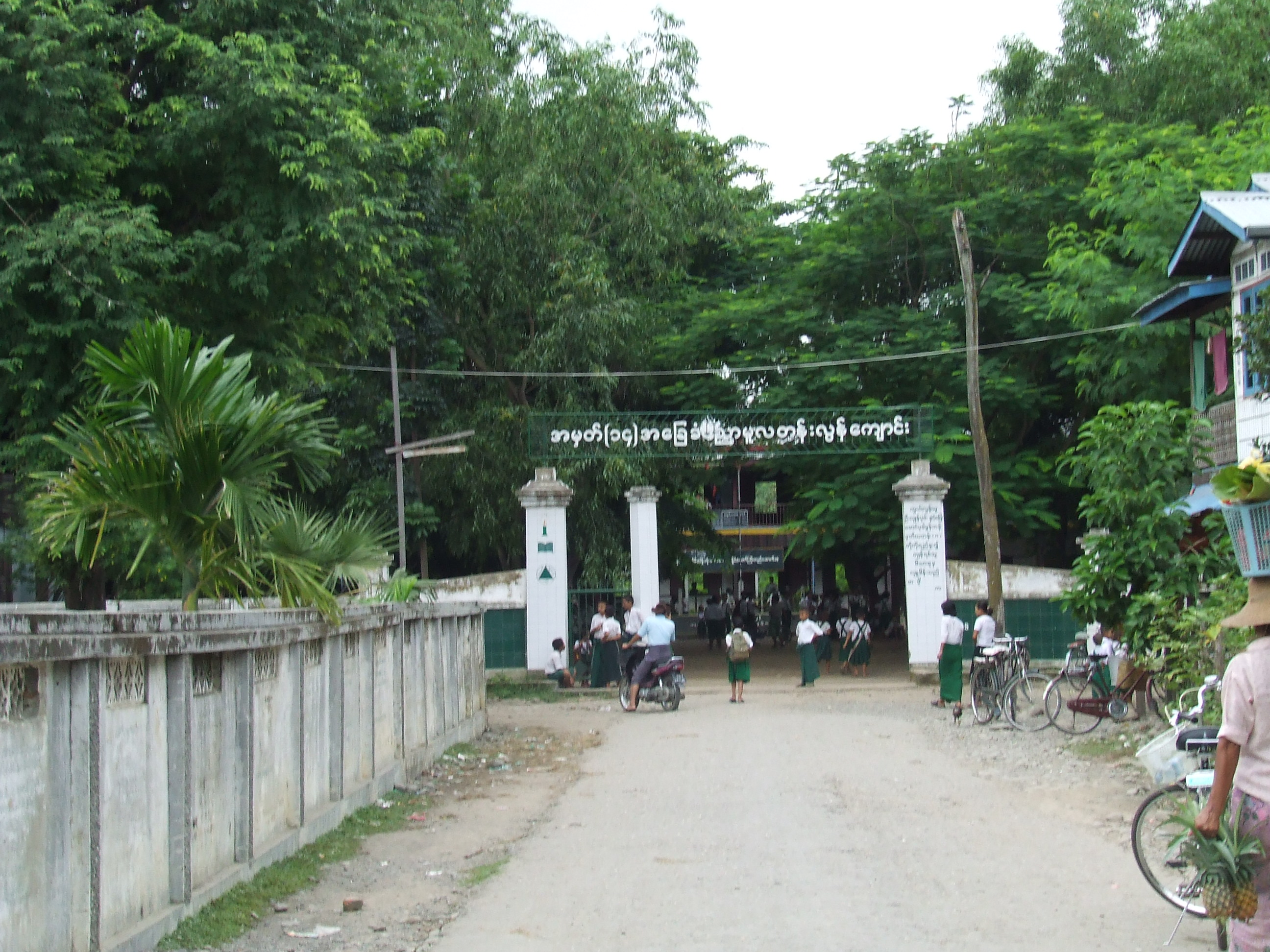
A school in Kalay

Kalaymyo, especially a living place for Chin Ethnic, is a significant town in the Sagaing Region of Myanmar, near the border with Chin State and India. The town itself has a historical educational background dating back to the arrival of the American Baptist Missionaries in 1899 and has grown in importance due to cross-border trade and multicultural civilization. There are multiple higher education institutions and universities in Kalay, which can lead a future generation to potential development and literacy improvement.

According to General Administration Department of Kalaymyo reports, the education system comprises with 42 government primary schools, 77 middle schools, and 45 high schools, sustaining a 91.3% literacy rate. In 2022–23, total enrollment reached 14,893 students—1,612 in primary, 4,051 in middle, and 9,230 in high schools—with 1,036 qualified teachers yielding an average student–teacher ratio of 14:1 (11:1 in primary, 12:1 in middle, 16:1 in high); 65% of instructors hold bachelor’s degrees.

Vocational training high school, and nursing and midwifery training school support the town's needs for health recovery and professional workers for ongoing multidimensional development. In Kalaymyo, there are three main universities: Kalay University, Technological University, Kalay, and University of Computer Studies, Kalay.

== Economy ==
The economy of Kalay is dependent upon agriculture, but it is also an industrial town. Cars, jeeps, trucks, fire engines, trailers, and three-wheeled motorcycles are manufactured in the Kalay Industrial Estate. The town is the hub of trading activity with India across the border.

Kalay Township is unable to meet its own food requirements, although it exports food to neighbouring towns and cities. It has 80,000 acres (32,000 ha) under paddy, 10,000 acres (4,000 ha) under peas, and 40,000 acres (16,000 ha) under cooking oil crops. The irrigation dam in RāZāJo village will provide water to grow more crops under irrigated conditions.

Kalay Township has teak, ironwood (Pterocarpus indicus), the large timber tree Shorea obtusa, Shorea robusta and many other species of tree.

== Religion ==
The religious composition of Kalay and the surrounding township is listed as 35 percent Buddhists (mainly Theravada Buddhists), 70 percent Christian (mainly Baptist) and the remaining 5 percent follow other religious practices. The district has 116 Buddhist monasteries, 508 churches, a mosque, two Hindu temples, two Buddhist seminaries for nuns, five Buddhist nunneries and a joss house (Chinese communal temple ).

== Social infrastructure ==
The basic social services of education (primary to high school level, and universities within close commutable distances from the town), health services (general hospital, military hospital and traditional medicines' hospital), modern telecommunication network (telephone, Internet, telecommunication satellite network etc.), Media network of news papers (simultaneous coverage of news with Yangon), TV and radio services are well established in the town. The town's electricity needs are met from the MāNePu Hydroelectric Project, which also helps promote industries.

== Transportation ==
The strategic road between India and Myanmar, built with assistance from the Government of India, is the 165 kilometres (103 mi) Tamu–Kalay road. The Border Roads Organization, a parastatal organization of the Government of India, started construction of this road in 1997, which was opened by the Foreign Minister of India in 2001. This road has facilitated trans-border movement between India and Myanmar. Apart from this road, the town is well connected by a network of roads with Kalay, Gangaw, Monywa, Yagyi and Mandalay. The important road route during the rainy season is the Kalay-Gangaw-Monywa-Mandalay road and during winter it is the Kalay-Myoma-Yagyi-Monywa-Mandalay Route.

Rail services also operate between Kalay and Gangaw. This line passes through the Pountaung Pounyar Tunnel.

Inland water transport is also available up to Kalaywa, which is 24 kilometres (15 mi) short of Kalay. On this route, Morlike, Homalin, Khunte, Mingin and Monywar are also accessible.

There is an airport at Kalay, an extension of a British-built Second World War airstrip that was used to ferry troops and supplies into Myanmar during the British reconquest of Myanmar in 1945. The airport is located in the middle of the town. Myanmar National Airlines, Air Bagan, Air Mandalay and Air KBZ operate regular air services to and from Yangon, Mandalay and Kalaymyo. The airport is at an elevation of 499 feet (152 m); it has a 79 metres (259 ft) wide and 1,677 metres (5,502 ft) long runway with blacktopped surface.

== See also ==
- India–Myanmar barrier
- India–Myanmar relations
