= Mepok =

Mepok Mei Poke
- Village tract
- Location in Burma
- Coordinates: 25°51′54″N 95°34′15″E
- Country: Burma
- Region: Sagaing Region
- District: Hkamti District
- Township: Hkamti Township
- Elevation: 188 m (617 ft)

Population (2014)
  - Total: 255
- Time zone: UTC+6.30 (MST)

Mepok or Mei Poke is a village and village tract in Hkamti Township in Hkamti District in the Sagaing Region of northwestern Burma. At the time of the 2014 census the village tract had a population of 255 people.

== History ==
In the early 20th century the British established a small rubber plantation with hevea trees at Mepok. It didn't prove to be successful.

== Geography ==
Mepok is situated in Hkamti Township in the Sagaing Region of northwestern Burma, along the Chindwin River at an elevation of 188 metres (617 ft). It is just to the south of Heinsun, about 19.5 kilometres (12.1 mi) south of Hkamti town. The village tract borders Heinsun to the north, Lin Hpar to the southeast and Saung Lin to the northwest. The village of Laung Tauk lies within the village tract of Mepok further in land from the Chindwin, towards the village of Sein Lae in Saung Lin.

== Demographics ==
At the time of the 2014 census the village tract had a population of 255 people of which 140 were men and 115 were women. 55 households were recorded.
