= Mahu =

Mahu may refer to:

- Māhū, third gender person in some Polynesian cultures
- Mahu (noble), ancient Egyptian official of the 18th Dynasty
- Mahu (official), ancient Egyptian official of the 19th Dynasty
- Mahu, Estonia, village in Viru-Nigula Parish, Lääne-Viru County, Estonia
- Mahu, Mingin, village in Sagaing Region of western Myanmar (Burma)
- Mawu, Dahomey goddess, sometimes called Mahu
- Cornelis Mahu (1613–1689), a Flemish Baroque painter
- Stephan Mahu, (died 1541), composer of the Franco-Flemish School
- Mariahilfer Straße, commonly referred to as "Mahü"
