= Aung Myay =

- Village tract
- Location in Burma
- Coordinates: 25°57′48″N 95°43′26″E
- Country: Burma
- Region: Sagaing Region
- District: Hkamti District
- Township: Hkamti Township

Population (2014)
  - Total: 1,366
- Time zone: UTC+6.30 (MST)

not to be confused with Aungmyethazan Township of Mandalay Region.

Aung Myay is a village and village tract in Hkamti Township in Hkamti District in the Sagaing Region of northwestern Burma. It lies on the Nam Tonhtun, a tributary of the Chindwin River. At the time of the 2014 census the village tract had a population of 1366 people.

== Geography ==
Aung Myay is situated about 4.5 kilometres (2.8 mi) southeast of Hkamti in the Sagaing Region of northwestern Burma. It lies on the Nam Tonhtun (also spelled Nam Ton Tun), which flows down from the Chindwin River between the village and Hkamti. The Nam Ton Tun meanders around the village. The areas immediately to the west and east of Aung Myay are forested but along the river bank are fields where crops are grown in the areas to the northwest and southeast.

== Demographics ==
At the time of the 2014 census the village tract had a population of 1366 people of which 883 were men and 483 were women. 145 households were recorded.
