= Nyaunggon, Mingin =

Nyaunggon
- Village
- Location in Burma
- Coordinates: 22°51′30″N 94°45′48″E
- Country: Burma
- Region: Sagaing Region
- District: Kale District
- Township: Mingin Township
- Time zone: UTC+6.30 (MST)

Nyaunggon is a village in Mingin Township, Kale District, in the Sagaing Region of western Burma. It lies on the Chindwin River.
