= Konyin =

Panset a village in Mingin Township, Kale District, in the Sagaing Region of western Burma.
