= Manpagale =

- Village
- Location in Burma
- Coordinates: 23°31′N 94°24′E
- Country: Burma
- Region: Sagaing Region
- District: Kale District
- Township: Kalewa Township
- Time zone: UTC+6.30 (MST)

Manpagale is a village in Kalewa Township, Kale District, in the Sagaing Region of western Burma. It lies on the left bank of the Chindwin River.

== See also ==
- Townships of Burma
