= Laung Sauk =

- Village tract
- Location in Burma
- Coordinates: 26°6′N 95°36′E
- Country: Burma
- Region: Sagaing Region
- District: Hkamti District
- Township: Hkamti Township

Population (2014)
  - Total: 443
- Time zone: UTC+6.30 (MST)

Laung Sauk or Lawngsawk is a village and village tract in Hkamti Township in Hkamti District in the Sagaing Region of northwestern Burma. As of 2014 the village tract had a population of 443 people.

== Geography ==
Laung Sauk is located in the hill forest to the northwest of Hkamti town. A dirt trail leads up to the isolated Laung Sauk area from Hkamti and the Chindwin River. To the north of Laung Sauk is the river village of Mandung.

== Demographics ==
At the time of the 2014 census the village tract had a population of 443 people of which 226 were men and 217 were women. 66 households were recorded. The locals speak their own dialect, "lawng-sauk".
