= Wetto =

- Village
- Location in Burma
- Coordinates: 23°21′N 94°24′E
- Country: Burma
- Region: Sagaing Region
- District: Kale District
- Township: Kalewa Township
- Time zone: UTC+6.30 (MST)

Wetto is a village in Kalewa Township, Kale District, in the Sagaing Region of western Burma.
