= Kyauktan =

Kyauktan may refer to several places in Burma:

- Kyauktan, Banmauk
- Kyauktan, Bhamo
- Kyauktan, Kalewa
- Kyauktan Township, a township of Yangon Region
