= Thazi, Mingin =

Thazi သာစည်
- Village
- Location in Myanmar
- Coordinates: 22°57′N 94°18′E
- Country: Myanmar
- Region: Sagaing Region
- District: Kale District
- Township: Mingin Township
- Time zone: UTC+6.30 (MST)

Thazi is a village in Mingin Township, Kale District, in the Sagaing Region of western Burma.
