= Thanbauk =

Thanbauk may refer to:

- Thanbauk (poetic form)
- Thanbauk, Mingin, Burma
