= Lasaung =

- Village
- Location in Burma
- Coordinates: 25°59′N 95°39′E
- Country: Burma
- Region: Sagaing Region
- District: Hkamti District
- Township: Hkamti Township
- Time zone: UTC+6.30 (MST)

Lasaung is a village in Hkamti Township in Hkamti District in the Sagaing Region of northwestern Burma.
