= Meme, Mingin =

Mei Me
- Village
- Location in Myanmar
- Coordinates: 22°47′49.5″N 94°22′10.2″E
- Country: Myanmar
- Region: Sagaing Region
- District: Kale District
- Township: Mingin Township
- Time zone: UTC+6.30 (MST)

Mei Me is a village in Mingin Township, Kale District, in the Sagaing Region of western Myanmar.
