= Myaukchun =

- Village
- Location in Myanmar
- Coordinates: 23°5′N 94°24′E
- Country: Burma
- Region: Sagaing Region
- District: Kale District
- Township: Mingin Township
- Time zone: UTC+6.30 (MST)

Myaukchun is a village in Mingin Township, Kale District, in the Sagaing Region of western Myanmar.
