= Shwedaung =

- Town
- Location in Burma
- Coordinates: 23°14′N 94°20′E
- Country: Myanmar
- Region: Sagaing Region
- District: Kale District
- Township: Kalewa Township
- Time zone: UTC+6.30 (MST)

Shwedaung is a town in Kalewa Township, Kale District, in the Sagaing Region of western Burma.
