= Tinbet =

Village in Sagaing Region, Myanmar (Burma)

- Village
- Location in Burma
- Coordinates: 22°49′N 94°29′E
- Country: Burma
- Region: Sagaing Region
- District: Kale District
- Township: Mingin Township
- Time zone: UTC+6.30 (MST)

Tinbet is a village in Mingin Township, Kale District, in the Sagaing Region of western Myanmar, Also Known as Burma.
