= Ayadaw (disambiguation) =

Ayadaw may refer to several places in Burma:

- Ayadaw -a town in Sagaing Region, Burma and seat of Ayadaw Township
- Ayadaw, Mingin
