= Winwa =

Winwa may refer to several places in Burma:

- Winwa, Mingin, a village in Mingin Township, Kale District, in the Sagaing Region of western Burma
- Winwa, Shwegu, a village in Shwegu Township, Bhamo District, in the Kachin State of north-eastern Burma
