= Tongyi =

Tongyi could refer to:

- Qwen, also known as Tongyi, a family of large language models

== Places ==
- Tongyi, Mingin Township, village in Kale District, Sagaing Region, Burma
- Tongyi, Nehe, town in Heilongjiang, China
- Tongyi, village in Yonglong, Jingshan County, Jingmen, Hubei
