= Pya =

Pya or PYA may refer to:

- pya, a unit of currency, a division of the Burmese kyat
- Pya, Mingin, a village in Burma
- PYa, MP-443 Grach, a Russian pistol designated PYa
- PYA, Pakistan Yachting Association, former name of the Pakistan Sailing Federation
- PYA/Monarch, US Foods
- Pouya Cargo Air (ICAO airline code: PYA)
- Velasquez Airport (IATA airport code: PYA), see List of airports in Colombia
