= Myogon =

Myogon may refer to several places in Burma:

- Myogon, Mingin
- Myogon, Shwegu
