= Mankaw =

Mankaw may refer to several places in Burma:

- Mankaw, Shwegu
- Mankaw, Kalewa
