= Thingan =

Thingan may refer to:

- Thingan, Kalewa, Burma
- Thingan, Nepal
