= Ongwe Zayat =

- Village
- Location in Burma
- Coordinates: 22°47′N 94°26′E
- Country: Burma
- Region: Sagaing Region
- District: Kale District
- Township: Mingin Township
- Time zone: UTC+6.30 (MST)

Ongwe Zayat is a village in Mingin Township, Kale District, in the Sagaing Region of western Burma.
