= Kazet =

Kazet may refer to:

- Kazet, Kalewa, Burma
- Kazet (album)
