= Pathe =

Pathe or Pathé may refer to:

- Pathé, a French company established in 1896
- Pathé Exchange, U.S. division of the French film company that was spun off into an independent entity
- Pathé News, a French and British distributor of cinema newsreels, now known as British Pathé
- Pathé Records, a French and American record label
- Pathé Records (China), a producer of Chinese recordings
- Pathe, Mingin, Burma
- Pathé, one of the three components of Epicureanism#Epistemology
- M. Pathe, a Japanese film studio no longer active

== People ==
- Amadou Pathé Diallo (born 1964), Malian footballer
- Charles Pathé, (1863–1957), principal & co-founder of Pathé
- Pathé Bangoura (born 1984), Guinean footballer
- Pathé Ciss (born 1994), Senegalese footballer

== See also ==
- Gaumont-Pathe Archives
  - Pathé Cinémas
- MGM-Pathé Communications
