= Myittha =

Myittha may refer to many places in Myanmar:

- Myittha, Mandalay Region, in Myittha Township, Mandalay Region
- Myittha, Kalewa, Sagaing Region
- Myittha, Myaung, Sagaing Region
- Myittha, Ngazun, Sagaing Region
- Myittha, Monyo, Bago Region
- Myittha River

== See also ==
- Myitta
