= Kywegya =

- Village
- Location in Myanmar
- Coordinates: 22°51′N 94°33′E
- Country: Myanmar
- Region: Sagaing Region
- District: Kale District
- Township: Mingin Township
- Time zone: UTC+6.30 (MST)

Kywegya is a village in Mingin Township, Kale District, in the Sagaing Region of western Myanmar. It is located near the Chindwin River, southeast of Kyauk-o.
