= Kalewa Township =

- Township
- Location in Kale district

- Location in Sagaing region

- Location in Burma
- Coordinates: 23°12′N 94°18′E
- Country: Burma
- Region: Sagaing Region
- District: Kale District
- Capital: Kalewa
- Time zone: UTC+6.30 (MST)

Kalewa Township is a township of Kale District in Sagaing Division of western Burma (Myanmar). The principal town and administrative seat is Kalewa. The Paluzawa coalmines are located in Kalewa township.

== Borders ==
Kalewa Township is bordered by:

- Mawlaik Township, to the north,
- Kyunhla Township, to the east,
- Mingin Township, to the south, and
- Kale (Kalemyo Township), to the west.

== Towns and villages ==
Auktawgyi, Chaungzon, Chingyaung, Gaundi, Gazet, Hintin, Hkonbyin, Hmangon, Indaing, Ingon, Inmatin, Kado, Kaing, Kaing Shwedaung, Kalewa, Kanni, Kazet, Kongyi, Kunbyo, Kyauktan, Kyaunggyigon, Kyawdaw, Kyawzin, Kyudaw Chaungzon, Kywegu, Kywegyan, Kywenan, Laungmin, Legyidaw, Letpannginaung, Manpagale, Mankaw, Masein, Matu, Mutaik, Myittha, Nammaw, Nanmawke, Naungput, Nwedan, Paga, Pagyizu, Paluzawa, Paunggyaung, Pawlaw, Sabagyi, Segyi, Shan-in, Shwedaung, Shwegyin, Shwewagaw, Sinaingma, Singaung, Sizwe, Tadichaungwa, Taya, Thanbaya, Thetkegyin, Thingan, Tunhlaw, Webon, Welon, Wetto, Yawzu, Ywatha Kyawe That
