= Pya, Mingin =

- Village
- Location in Burma
- Coordinates: 22°37′N 94°19′E
- Country: Burma
- Region: Sagaing Region
- District: Kale District
- Township: Mingin Township
- Time zone: UTC+6.30 (MST)

Pya, Mingin is a village in Mingin Township, Kale District, in the Sagaing Region of western Burma.

== Religion == Buddhism is the predominant religion in the Sagaing Region, with 92.2% of the population identifying as Buddhist, according to the 2014 Myanmar Census. In Pya, a village in Mingin Township, residents likely participate in Buddhist practices, including merit-making ceremonies, offerings to monks, and festivals such as Thingyan (Water Festival) and Thadingyut (Lighting Festival). Small pagodas or shrines are presumed to be present in the village, reflecting local religious traditions. Minority religious communities, including Christians (6.6%) and Muslims (1.1%) in the Sagaing Region, may also be represented in Pya. Christian and Muslim households, if present, likely observe holidays such as Christmas or Eid al-Fitr, respectively. The Sagaing Region is a significant center for Buddhist monasticism, hosting 55,041 registered monks and 9,915 thilashin (Buddhist nuns) as of 2014. Monastic life likely influences Pya, with villagers supporting nearby monasteries through alms-giving and participation in religious festivals.
