= Kaunghein =

- Village tract
- Location in Burma
- Coordinates: 25°41′N 95°26′E
- Country: Burma
- Region: Sagaing Region
- District: Hkamti District
- Township: Hkamti Township

Population (2014)
  - Total: 1,251
- Time zone: UTC+6.30 (MST)

Kaunghein is a village and village tract in Hkamti Township in Hkamti District in the Sagaing Region of northwestern Burma. At the time of the 2014 census the village tract had a population of 1251 people of which 670 were men and 581 were women. 208 households were recorded.
