= Myittha, Kalewa =

Myittha
- Village
- Location in Burma
- Coordinates: 23°18′N 94°19′E
- Country: Burma
- Region: Sagaing Region
- District: Kale District
- Township: Kalewa Township
- Time zone: UTC+6.30 (MST)

Myittha is a village in Kalewa Township, Kale District, in the Sagaing Region of western Burma.
