= Tekti =

- Village tract
- Location in Burma
- Coordinates: 26°22′8″N 95°53′27″E
- Country: Burma
- Region: Sagaing Region
- District: Hkamti District
- Township: Hkamti Township

Population (2014)
  - Total: 1,205
- Time zone: UTC+6.30 (MST)

Tekti or Taik Tee is a small river village and village tract in Hkamti Township in Hkamti District in the Sagaing Region of northwestern Burma. It is located to the west of Hakon and south of Mount Sangpang Bum in a heavily forested part of the country. At the time of the 2014 census, the village tract had a population of 1205 people of which 758 were men and 447 were women. 138 households were recorded.
