= Mingin Township =

- Township
- Location in Kale district

- Location in Sagaing region

- Location in Burma
- Coordinates: 22°55′30″N 94°37′0″E
- Country: Burma
- Region: Sagaing Region
- District: Kale District
- Capital: Mingin
- Time zone: UTC+6.30 (MST)

Mingin Township is a township of Kale District in Sagaing Division of north-western Burma (Myanmar). The principal town and administrative seat is Mingin (Minking).

== Borders ==
Mingin Township is bordered by:

- Kalewa Township, to the north,
- Kyunhla Township and Taze Township of Shwebo District, to the northeast,
- Ye-U Township of Shwebo District, to the east,
- Kani Township of Yinmabin District, to the southeast and south,
- Gangaw Township of Gangaw District, Magway Division, to the southwest, and
- Kale (Kalemyo Township), to the west.

== Towns and villages ==
A Htet Satha(Upper Satha), Anauktaw, Auk Satha, Ayadaw, Chauknet Zayat, Chaungwa, Gonnyin, Gwedaukkaing, Hka-u-in, Hpayonga, Htonban, Htonwaing, Inbinhla, Ingongyi, Kabyit, Kawmat, Kin-u, Konywa, Kyabin, Kyauk-o, Kyawywa, Kyidaung, Kyundaw, Kyunywa, Kywe, Kywegya, Laungbyit, Laungde, Launggyin, Linlu, Mahu, Maukkadaw, Meme, Mingin, Mogaung, Moktha, Mondin, Myaukchun, Myaungzin, Myengan, Myogon, Myoma, Natbuzut, Ngananda, Nyaunggaing, Nyaunggon, Ongwe Zayat, Onhnebok, Pangauk, Panset, Pathe, Pathwa, Patolon, Paukaing, Peikchindaw, Petkat, Pindin, Pwetnyet, Pya, Pyathon, Pyindaw, Pyingaing, Samyin, Seiktha, Shandaw, Shawdaw, Sheywa, Sitlingyaung, Tamaung, Tatchaung, Taungbyu, Tawma, Tegyi, Tegyigan, Thanbauk, Thazi, Thebokkya, Theingon, Thinbaw, Thindaw, Thinwin, Thitkaungdi, Tidalok, Tinbet, Tinwagyaung, Ton, Tongyi, Uywa, Winwa, Yondaung, Ywaba, Zalokma, Zanabok, Zingale, Ywataw.
