= Winwa, Mingin =

Winwa
- Village
- Location in Burma
- Coordinates: 44'33" N94 23' 9" E region:MM 22.7°N 94.4°E
- Country: Burma
- Region: Sagaing Region
- District: Kale District
- Township: Mingin Township
- Time zone: UTC+6.30 (MST)

Winwa is a village in Mingin Township, Kale District, in the Sagaing Region of western Burma.
