= Kyundaw, Mingin =

Kyundaw
- Village
- Location in Burma
- Coordinates: 23°2′N 94°40′E
- Country: Burma
- Region: Sagaing Region
- District: Kale District
- Township: Mingin Township
- Time zone: UTC+6.30 (MST)

Kyundaw is a village in Mingin Township, Kale District, in the Sagaing Region of western Burma.
