= Hkampti =

- Village
- Location in Burma
- Coordinates: 26°0′N 95°40′E
- Country: Burma
- Region: Sagaing Region
- District: Hkamti District
- Township: Hkamti Township
- Time zone: UTC+6.30 (MST)

Hkampti is a small village in Hkamti Township in Hkamti District in the Sagaing Region of northwestern Burma.

== Climate ==
Hkampti has a humid subtropical climate (Köppen climate classification Cwa) bordering on a tropical monsoon climate (Köppen climate classification Am). Temperatures are very warm throughout the year, although the winter months (December–February) are milder. There is a winter dry season (November–March) and a summer wet season (April–October). Torrential rain falls from June to September, with over 1,000 millimetres (39 in) falling in July alone.

Climate data for Hkampti
Month	Jan	Feb	Mar	Apr	May	Jun	Jul	Aug	Sep	Oct	Nov	Dec	Year
Mean daily maximum °C (°F)	26.4 (79.5)	26.5 (79.7)	30.2 (86.4)	31.3 (88.3)	32.7 (90.9)	31.7 (89.1)	30.4 (86.7)	30.9 (87.6)	31.2 (88.2)	31.1 (88.0)	28.6 (83.5)	24.4 (75.9)	29.6 (85.3)
Mean daily minimum °C (°F)	9.0 (48.2)	12.1 (53.8)	15.7 (60.3)	19.4 (66.9)	22.3 (72.1)	23.8 (74.8)	24.1 (75.4)	24.2 (75.6)	23.4 (74.1)	20.9 (69.6)	15.9 (60.6)	10.4 (50.7)	18.4 (65.2)
Average precipitation mm (inches)	7 (0.3)	11 (0.4)	29 (1.1)	75 (3.0)	198 (7.8)	784 (30.9)	1,021 (40.2)	658 (25.9)	505 (19.9)	216 (8.5)	42 (1.7)	23 (0.9)	3,569 (140.6)
Source: NOAA (1961-1990)
