= Pyathon =

- Village
- Location in Myanmar
- Coordinates: 22°46′N 94°23′E
- Country: Myanmar
- Time zone: UTC+6.30 (MST)

Pyathon is a village in Taungdwin Region, Minkin Township, Kale District, Sagaing Division in Myanmar.
