= Mahu (official) =

Mahu was an ancient Egyptian official who was in office under king Ramses II. He is mainly known from his monumental tomb excavated at Saqqara.

Mahu held several important titles. He was royal scribe, high steward of Ptah, overseer of the Granary of the Lord of truth, royal messenger to the land of Khatti and steward in the temple of Ramses II in the estate of Ptah, Attendant of the Lord of the two Lands. He was also overseer of the treasuries of Ptah. Mahu hold evidently functions at the royal court, but also functions at the local Ptah temple. The title royal messenger to the land of Khatti is of special interest. The Khatti are the Hittites and there is good evidence for contacts between the Hittites and the Egyptians under Ramses II. The two main events are the Battle of Kadesh and the peace treaty between the two empires in Year 21 of Ramses II. Mahu was not involved in the latter and he seems to have been in office later.

The tomb of Mahu (ST218) was excavated by Sayed Tawfid. The above ground funerary chapel is about 35.8 meter long and about 7.7 meter wide. It consist of three courtyards, the second and the third one are adorned with columns. At the very back there are three cult chapels and behind them a pyramid.

The tomb had two owners, Nebnefer and Mahu. They both had similar titles. Nebnefer was the father of Mahu.
