= Mingin, Myanmar =

Town in Sagaing Region, Myanmar

Mingin မင်းကင်း
- Town
- Location in Burma
- Coordinates: 22°52′38″N 94°29′47″E
- Country: Burma
- Region: Sagaing Region
- District: Kale District
- Township: Mingin Township
- Time zone: UTC+6.30 (MST)

Mingin (Min Gin, Min Kin or Minking Burmese: မင်းကင်း) is a town on the southern side (right bank) of the Chindwin River in Kale District, Sagaing Division, Myanmar. Located in north-western Myanmar, it is the administrative center for Mingin Township.
