= Heinsun =

- Village tract
- Location in Burma
- Coordinates: 26°52′N 95°35′E
- Country: Burma
- Region: Sagaing Region
- District: Hkamti District
- Township: Hkamti Township

Population (2014)
  - Total: 476
- Time zone: UTC+6.30 (MST)

Heinsun or Hein Sun is a small village and village tract in Hkamti Township in Hkamti District in the Sagaing Region of northwestern Burma. It is located near the border with India, just south of the border village of Laju. The village is inhabited by the Naga people, noted in the village for their weaving.

At the time of the 2014 census the village tract had a population of 476 people of which 237 were men and 239 were women. 88 households were recorded.
