= Hkamti Township =

Hkamti Township ခန္တီးမြို့နယ် Zingkaling Khamti
- Township
- Location in Sagaing region
- Coordinates: 26°0′N 95°41′E
- Country: Myanmar
- Region: Sagaing Region
- District: Hkamti
- Capital: Hkamti

Area
  - Total: 8,174 km^{2} (3,156 sq mi)

Population
  - Total: 47,658
- Time zone: UTC+6.30 (MST)

Hkamti Township (Burmese: ခန္တီးမြို့နယ် [kʰàɰ̃tì mjo̰nɛ̀]) is the only township of Hkamti District in the Sagaing Region of Myanmar. The principal town is Hkamti. As of 2014 the township had a population of 47,658 people and covered an area of 8,174 square kilometres (3,156 sq mi). The township is dominated by the Chindwin River and its tributaries as well as thickly forested areas. Nearly half the active working population are employed in agriculture, forestry or fishing. The township is a producer of rice and has gold and jade reserves.

== History ==
The name "Hkamti" means "Place of Gold". According to James George Scott's 1901 Gazetteer of Upper Burma and the Shan States, the Hkamti area was ruled by seven "Sawbwas" before the British arrived. Hkamti was bordered to the east and the south by Uyu Township and to the west by Chin country bordering Assam and covered an area of 2576 square miles.

In the 1900s the British established a small rubber plantation with hevea trees at Mepok. It didn't prove successful. In 1914 the British built Fort Hertz in the territory of what was then Hkamti Long. Captain Frank Kingdon-Ward visited it on his travels. Hkamti later became the headquarters of the Myanmar Hills for the 52nd Myanmar Regiment who were controlling the area.

In creating the Naga Self-Administered Zone in 2010, a small portion of Hkamti Township south of the Kundwin Hemu (stream) was transferred to Leshi Township.

At 4am on 9 September 2016, a hand-made bomb was detonated about 800 metres (2,600 ft) from Hkamti town. One person was killed, the person who detonated the bomb. Investigation of the area by the authorities found four unexploded mines which failed to detonate which were believed to be due to wet gunpowder. In July 2018, extensive flooding during the summer monsoon saw the village of Thazi evacuated and the people relocated.

== Geography ==
Hkamti Township is situated in Hkamti District in the Sagaing Region of northwestern Burma. The township is bordered by Nanyun Township to the north, Lahe Township to the northwest, Lay Shi Township to the southwest, Homalin Township to the south, and borders the Kachin State townships of Tanai Township to the northeast and Hpakan Township to the east and southeast.

The township is dominated by the Chindwin River and areas of thick forest. The Nam Tonhtun flows into the Chindwin to the southeast of Hkamti Town after meandering around the village of Aung Myay. The Nam Samun and Nam Saukpa streams flow into the Chindwin to the north and south of the village of Kaunghein respectively. The Nam Kadon flows into the Chindwin near Kadi-thingan in the Seinnan village tract. The Nam Za-wu begins in the hamlet of Sunzo (Sun So) in Saung Lin village tract and enters the Chindwin at the village of Mepok (Mei Poke). The Natyesan Chaung flows into the Chindwin in the south of township near Minsin. Other streams include the Nam Pilin, Nam Sake and the Nam Le.

The Hkamti site SW of the Hukawng basin is also an important site for Burmese amber in palaeontology. The site has been determined to be significantly older, dating to the early Albian around ca. 110 million years ago and is therefore considered distinct.

== Administrative divisions ==
=== Village tracts and wards ===
The township is divided administratively into 25 village tracts and 3 wards. According to the 2014 census the population of each is given:

==== Wards ====
- Hkamti Myo Mar (3233)
- Paw Maing (3358)
- Zip Phyu Gone (Zee Hpyu Kone) (4960)

==== Village tracts ====
- Ah Shey Kauk Taung (1194)
- Ah Nauk Kauk Taung (575)
- Aung Myay (1366)
- Hein Sun (476)
- Hpaung Saing (723)
- Hat Ti (327)
- Hman Pin (2616)
- Hpaing Lin (263)
- Kaung Hein (1251)
- Kha Maung (668)
- Kin Taw (1408)
- Kyauk Ywet (363)
- Laik Khaw (452)
- Laung Sauk (443)
- Lin Hpar (1371)
- Maw Law (304)
- Mei Poke (255)
- Min Sin (1789)
- Nant Hpar (2679)
- Pa Du Mone (7996)
- Par Saung (688)
- Par Yoe (984)
- Sar Lin (449)
- Saung Lin (954)
- Sein Nan (1462)
- Sin Thay (2611)
- Taik Ti (1205)
- Yat Nar (1255)

=== Villages ===
Hkamti Township also contains villages such as:

Ainda, Bahumaing, Chawhkam, Gum Ga, Hakon, Hintiu, Hkampti, Hkataw, Hpalamung, Htanghkaw, Janhtang, Kado-maingkun, Kado-thingan, Kadung Ga, Kauktaung-anauk, Kauktaung-ashe, 'Kawai, Kawala, Kawngkau, Kinsagahtawng, Kumteng, Lachau, Lachau Ga, Laisai Ga, Lapauk, Lapyep Ga, Lasaung, Laungtauk, Maingnaung, Mandung, Mangu, Man Pang, Masum Zup, Maung Te, Namhkam, Nammawhku Ga, Namsam, Napang Ga, Naukpe, Ngalang Ga, Ningbau Ga, Pachaung, Pangaw, Ritu Ga, Sabigahtawng, Salem, Saungle, Seinnan, Sekkyu, Shirang, Sinla, Sunzo, Taklang, Tasinngan, Thazi, Uka Ga, Utaw, Wakshang, Yana, Yang-yaw, Yungpaw Ga.

== Demographics ==
Historically the Shan people migrated to the Hkamti area from Mong Kawng, encouraged by the Shan ruler Sao Hsam Long Hpa. The Tibetan people also migrated as far south as the Hkamti plain. The Khamti ethnic group live in this region of Burma. In the Laung Sauk village tract in the hill forest to the northwest of Hkamti town, the locals speak their own dialect, "lawng-sauk".

At the time of the 2014 census, the religious composition of the population was: 87.9% Buddhist, 6.2% Christian, 4.3% Islam, 0.5% Hindu, 0.8% Animist, 0.2% Other religion and 0.1% No religion. The 4.3% Muslim is higher than the regional average of 1.1%. As of 2014. 79.1% of people in the township were literate, though this was significantly higher for youths in the 15-24 age bracket with 92.6%. School attendance was higher than the average in the country.

== Economy ==
At the time of the 2014 census, 77.4% of people aged 15–64 were employed in the township, though the disparity between males and females is high with males at 89.3% and females just 60%. 46.9% of all employed aged 15–64 were agricultural, forestry and fishery workers, followed by crafts and trade workers at 16.2%, the latter group higher than the regional average of 11%. In total, 7541 people were employed in agriculture, forestry or fishing, 1914 in mining and quarrying, 1647 in retail, 393 in accommodation and food services, 386 in transportation, 354 in construction, 665 in public administration, 263 in education, 241 in manufacturing and 155 in human health and social work activities.

The Chindwin River plays a key role in agricultural production in the township, with rice cultivated in several places. The area to the northwest of Hkamti town and the villages of Seinnan, Kado-thingan and Kaung Hein in particular are major centres for production in the township with extensive fields alongside the Chindwin. A North Korean firm is involved with gold mining in the township in the village of Nangsipon. Disputes broke out in the township over the mining of jade in January 2017.

== Health and social issues ==
The township in general has low living standards and suffers from poor access to quality healthcare, though Hkamti Hospital is situated in the southeast of the main town of Hkamti. In February 2020, Eleven News stated that Hkamti Township has the largest number of TB patients in the entire Sagaing Region, amounting to over 200 in Hkamti and Hpakant. The patients are being treated by a mobile team of doctors. The worst affected areas are Zip Phyu Gone ward and the villages of Sin Thayar and Shwe Pyi Thar. As of 2020 the health director of the township was Daw Naing Naing. A travelling medical team also treats diabetes and various diseases such as eye disorders, skin, bone and respiratory diseases, urinary tract infections, gum disease and gastroenteritis. In March 2019 a number of gold mining workers in Nangsipon were suffering from suspected cases of sepsis.

Drug trafficking and abuse has increasingly become a problem in the township, particularly among students of GTI Technical College and GTHS Government Industrial Science Institutes. Needles are often found in the streets of Hkamti town. U Thein Hlaing Win, a regional parliament speaker of the Sagaing Region stated that a Special Narcotics Force was being sent to Hkamti to deal with the issue.

Flooding is common in the summer months such as July during the monsoon. Flood disaster preventative training is provided by the Department of Natural Disaster Management, and further aid is provided by the Red Cross.

== Landmarks ==
The main buildings of the township are situated in Hkamti Town, such as Mya Thein Tan Pagoda, the Khamti Post Office and a branch of the Myanmar Economic Bank in the southeast of the town. Hkamti also contains the Paw Maine Church, The Full Gospel Assembly Church, the Kingdom Hall of the Jehovah's Witnesses, the Min Galar Market and a football pitch. Hkamti Airport lies to the southwest of the town.
