= Hkamti, Myanmar =

Hkamti ခန္တီးမြို့ (ဝဵင်းၶမ်းတီႈ) Khamti
- Town
- Location in Burma
- Coordinates: 26°00′06″N 95°41′32″E
- Country: Myanmar
- Region: Sagaing Region
- District: Hkamti District
- Township: Hkamti Township
- Time zone: UTC+6.30 (MST)

Hkamti, Khamti, Kanti or Kantee is a town in Hkamti District, Sagaing Division, in north-western Myanmar. It is the administrative center for both the district and Hkamti Township (Khamti Township).

Its airport is known as Khamti Airport.

== Climate ==
Climate data for Hkamti (1991–2020)
Month	Jan	Feb	Mar	Apr	May	Jun	Jul	Aug	Sep	Oct	Nov	Dec	Year
Record high °C (°F)	28.9 (84.0)	31.3 (88.3)	37.7 (99.9)	39.5 (103.1)	41.3 (106.3)	41.3 (106.3)	37.0 (98.6)	38.8 (101.8)	39.2 (102.6)	37.0 (98.6)	32.7 (90.9)	29.3 (84.7)	41.3 (106.3)
Mean daily maximum °C (°F)	24.5 (76.1)	27.1 (80.8)	30.3 (86.5)	32.3 (90.1)	32.9 (91.2)	31.2 (88.2)	30.0 (86.0)	31.3 (88.3)	31.6 (88.9)	30.8 (87.4)	28.2 (82.8)	24.7 (76.5)	29.6 (85.3)
Daily mean °C (°F)	16.8 (62.2)	19.4 (66.9)	22.9 (73.2)	25.7 (78.3)	27.3 (81.1)	27.4 (81.3)	26.9 (80.4)	27.6 (81.7)	27.4 (81.3)	25.9 (78.6)	21.9 (71.4)	17.8 (64.0)	23.9 (75.0)
Mean daily minimum °C (°F)	9.5 (49.1)	12.2 (54.0)	15.9 (60.6)	19.5 (67.1)	22.1 (71.8)	23.8 (74.8)	24.0 (75.2)	24.1 (75.4)	23.4 (74.1)	20.9 (69.6)	15.6 (60.1)	10.9 (51.6)	18.5 (65.3)
Record low °C (°F)	4.6 (40.3)	4.9 (40.8)	9.9 (49.8)	14.4 (57.9)	17.8 (64.0)	21.8 (71.2)	21.3 (70.3)	21.7 (71.1)	19.0 (66.2)	15.4 (59.7)	10.6 (51.1)	5.7 (42.3)	4.6 (40.3)
Average precipitation mm (inches)	7.0 (0.28)	13.9 (0.55)	22.6 (0.89)	49.6 (1.95)	241.8 (9.52)	781.1 (30.75)	1,101.6 (43.37)	800.5 (31.52)	480.9 (18.93)	216.3 (8.52)	20.8 (0.82)	3.9 (0.15)	3,739.8 (147.24)
Average precipitation days (≥ 1.0 mm)	1.4	2.0	3.6	6.4	11.9	22.9	26.7	22.6	18.6	10.5	2.3	0.8	129.8
Source 1: World Meteorological Organization
Source 2: Norwegian Meteorological Institute (extremes)
