= Chindwin River =

River in Myanmar

Chindwin River: Burmese: ချင်းတွင်းမြစ်; Meitei: ꯅꯤꯡꯊꯤ ꯇꯨꯔꯦꯜ
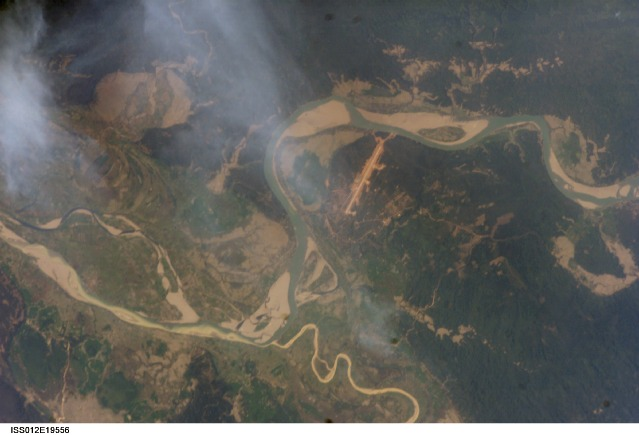
- The Chindwin at Homalin. The smaller, meandering Uyu River can be seen joining the Chindwin.

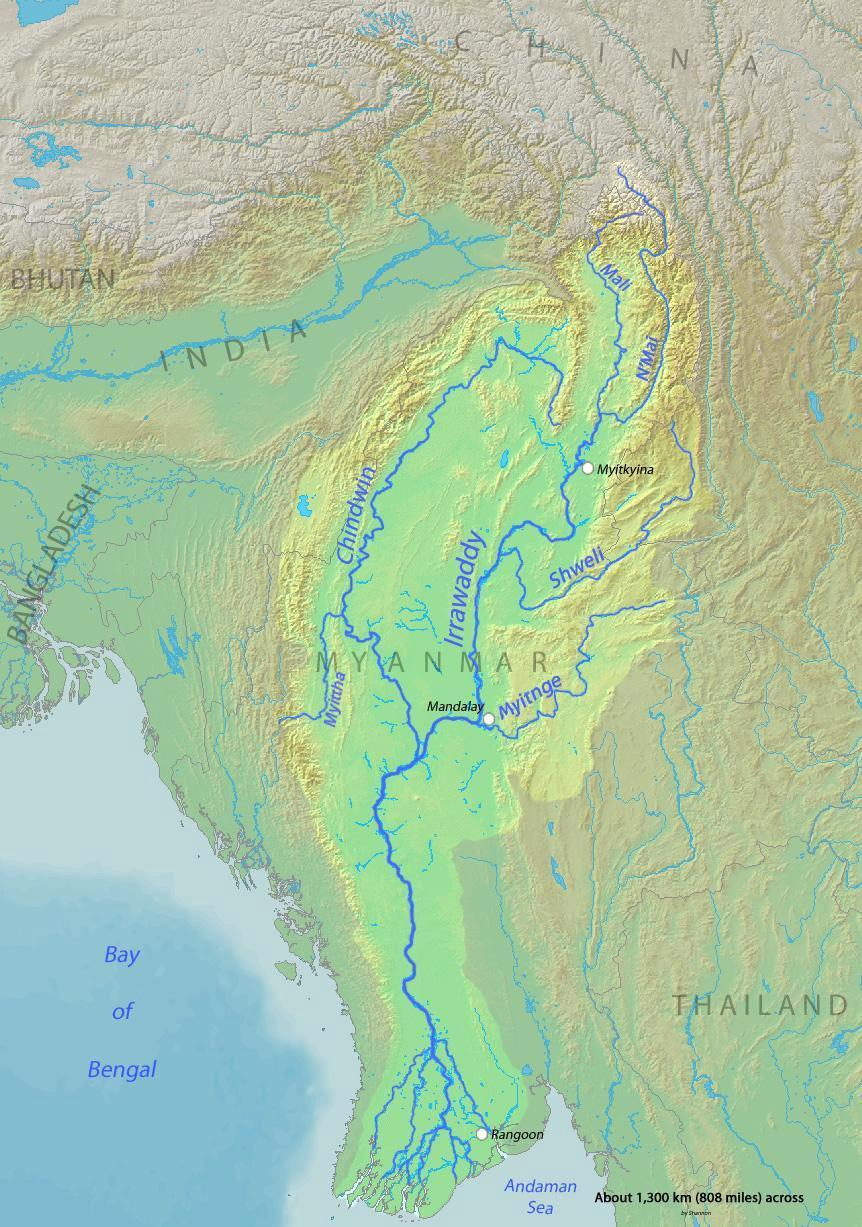

Location
- Country: Myanmar

Physical characteristics
- Source
  - location: Hukawng Valley, Kachin State
  - coordinates: 27°3′26.7048″N 97°1′33.618″E
  - elevation: 1,134 m (3,720 ft)
- Mouth
  - location: Irrawaddy River
  - coordinates: 21°28′26″N 95°16′53″E
  - elevation: 55 m (180 ft)
- Length: 1,207 km (750 mi)
- Basin size: 114,684.9 km^{2} (44,280.1 mi^{2})
- Discharge
  - location: Near mouth
  - average: (Period: 1967– 2009)149.7 km^{3}/a (4,740 m^{3}/s)
- Discharge
  - location: Monywa (74 km upstream of mouth; Basin size: 110,350 km^{2} (42,610 sq mi)
  - average: (Period: 1966–2009)4,637 m^{3}/s (163,800 cu ft/s)
  - minimum: (Period: 1966–2009)649 m^{3}/s (22,900 cu ft/s)
  - maximum: (Period: 1966–2009)19,935 m^{3}/s (704,000 cu ft/s)
- Discharge
  - location: Hkamti (Basin size: 27,420 km^{2} (10,590 sq mi)
  - average: (Period: 1972–2009)2,290 m^{3}/s (81,000 cu ft/s)
  - minimum: (Period: 1972–2009)109 m^{3}/s (3,800 cu ft/s)
  - maximum: (Period: 1972–2009)14,150 m^{3}/s (500,000 cu ft/s)

Basin features
- Tributaries
  - left: Uyu
  - right: Myittha

The Chindwin River (Burmese pronunciation: [t͡ɕɪ́ɰ̃dwɪ́ɰ̃ mjɪʔ]), also known as the Ningthi River (Meitei: [niŋtʰi tuɾel]), is a river in Myanmar and the largest tributary of the Irrawaddy River, which itself is the principal river of Myanmar.

== Sources ==
The Chindwin originates in the broad Hukawng Valley of Kachin State of Burma, roughly 26°26′18″N 96°33′32″E, where the Tanai, the Tabye, the Tawan, and the Taron (also known as Turong or Towang) rivers meet.

The headwaters of the Tanai are at 25°30′N 97°0′E on the Shwedaunggyi peak of the Kumon range, 12 miles (19 km) north of Mogaung. It flows due north until it reaches the Hukawng Valley. In 2004, the government established the world's largest tiger preserve in the Hukawng Valley, the Hukaung Valley Wildlife Sanctuary, with an area of approximately 6,500 km^{2} (2,500 sq mi); later, the Sanctuary was extended to 21,800 square kilometres (8,400 sq mi), making it the largest protected area in mainland Southeast Asia. The river then turns to the west and flows through the middle of the plain, joined by the Tabye, the Tawan, and the Taron rivers from the right bank. These rivers drain the mountain ranges to the north and northeast of the Hukawng valley.

== Course ==
The Tanai exits the Hukawng valley through the Taron or Turong valley and through a sharp defile in the river. It then takes on the name of Chindwin, and maintains a general southerly course. It passes the town of Singkaling Hkamti on the left bank, then the town of Homalin, also on the left bank.

The river's course is generally southwesterly until the town of Mingin. It then takes a more southeasterly course entering the broad central plain, passing the city of Monywa on the left bank. Its course at this point forms the boundary between the Sagaing District of Sagaing Region and the Pakokku District of Magway Region.

It enters the Ayeyarwady River (Irrawaddy) at about 21°30′N 95°15′E. The extreme outlets into the Ayeyarwady are about 22 miles (35 km) apart, the interval forming a succession of long, low, partially populated islands. The lowest mouth of the Chindwin is, according to tradition, an artificial channel, cut by one of the kings of Bagan (Pagan). It was choked up for centuries until 1824 when it was opened out by an exceptional flood. Satellite pictures show this lowest channel to be the widest one today.

== Discharge ==
Average, minimum and maximum discharge of the Chindwin River at Monywa. Period from 1966/01/01 to 2023/12/31:

Year	Discharge (m^{3}/s)			Year	Discharge (m^{3}/s)		
Year	Min	Mean	Max	Year	Min	Mean	Max
1966	610	5,611	24,550	1995	684	4,977	20,680
1967	775	4,812	17,740	1996	616	3,989	16,080
1968	757	5,137	25,450	1997	432	4,434	20,400
1969	582	4,006	20,130	1998	736	5,113	19,600
1970	548	4,775	19,790	1999	480	5,188	21,530
1971	509	5,792	19,450	2000	632	5,514	18,740
1972	757	3,257	16,490	2001	512	4,278	14,040
1973	530	5,103	21,700	2002	672	4,595	24,300
1974	921	5,566	25,000	2003	744	5,134	18,460
1975	709	4,493	17,840	2004	608	5,862	19,770
1976	892	6,928	26,650	2005	552	3,486	16,200
1977	798	4,398	23,800	2006	242	3,771	16,520
1978	672	3,956	16,540	2007	318	5,355	19,740
1979	530	4,063	18,920	2008	288	4,500	23,270
1980	806	5,075	20,300	2009	257	3,232	16,160
1981	790	3,833	16,010	2010	121	3,898	13,787
1982	650	4,385	23,160	2011	132	3,771	19,673
1983	653	4,247	18,840	2012	343	4,817	16,600
1984	600	5,091	22,710	2013	201	4,236	16,560
1985	613	5,305	19,450	2014	297	3,169	18,081
1986	591	3,981	15,420	2015		4,585	25,510
1987	659	5,339	20,010	2016	802	5,160	19,067
1988	610	5,097	25,450	2017		6,776	21,831
1989	783	4,796	22,490	2018		5,618	19,019
1990	907	5,670	20,580	2019	477	4,290	12,963
1991	852	6,488	25,600	2020		6,114	17,800
1992	1,039	4,102	14,470	2021	276	4,776	16,610
1993	981	4,826	21,140	2022	972	4,603	11,805
1994	644	3,439	13,410	2023	156	4,204	14,527

== Tributaries ==
1. Uyu River is the largest tributary joining the Chindwin river just below Homalin on the left. The famous jade mines at Hpakant lie in the headwaters of the Uyu.
2. Myittha River drains the Kale valley and joins on the right further downstream. The town of Kalewa is on the left bank of their confluence.
3. Tizu River originates from central Nagaland in northeast India. It flows through Zünheboto and Phek districts and finally joins the Chindwin river.

== Towns ==
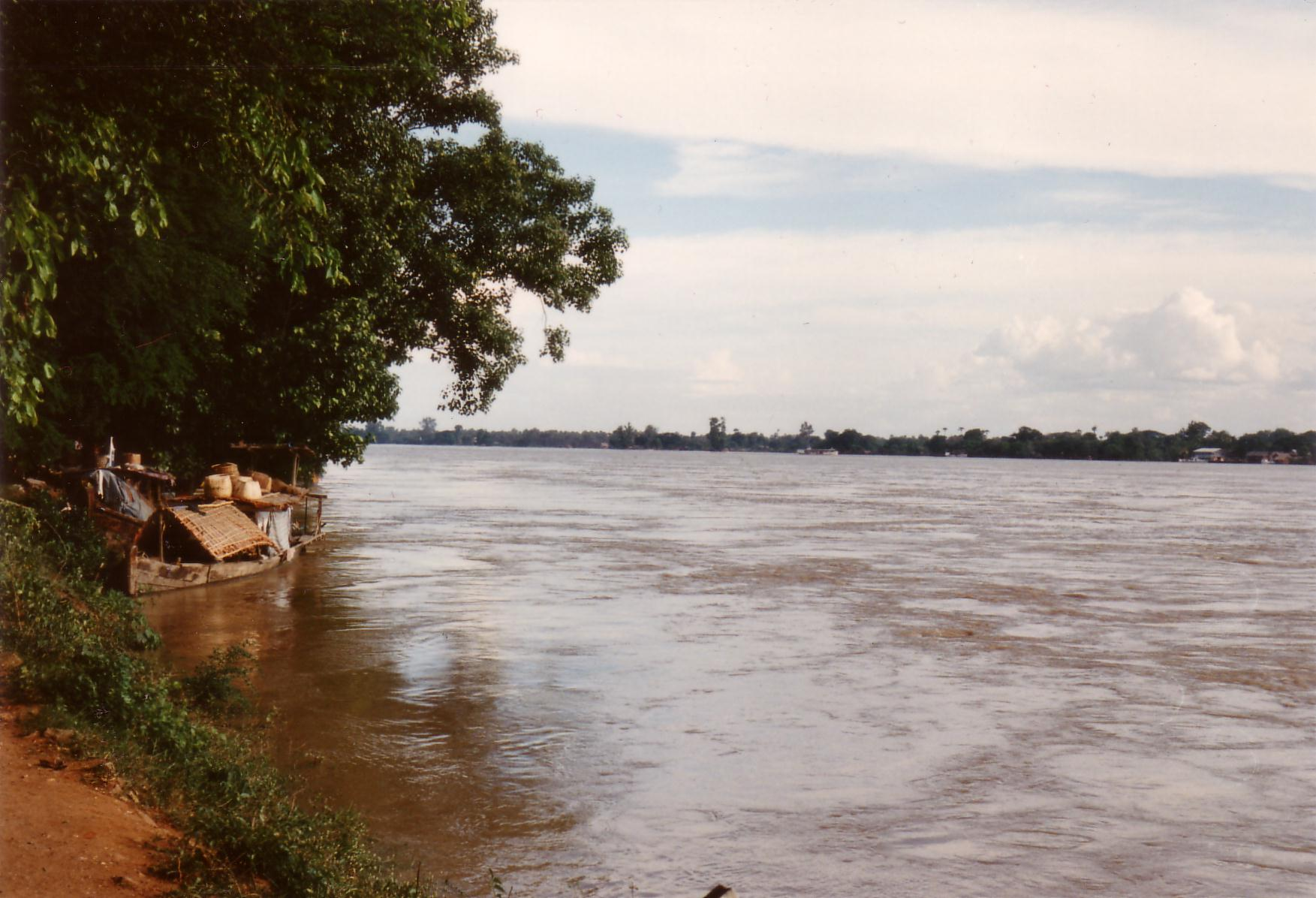
River Chindwin at Monywa

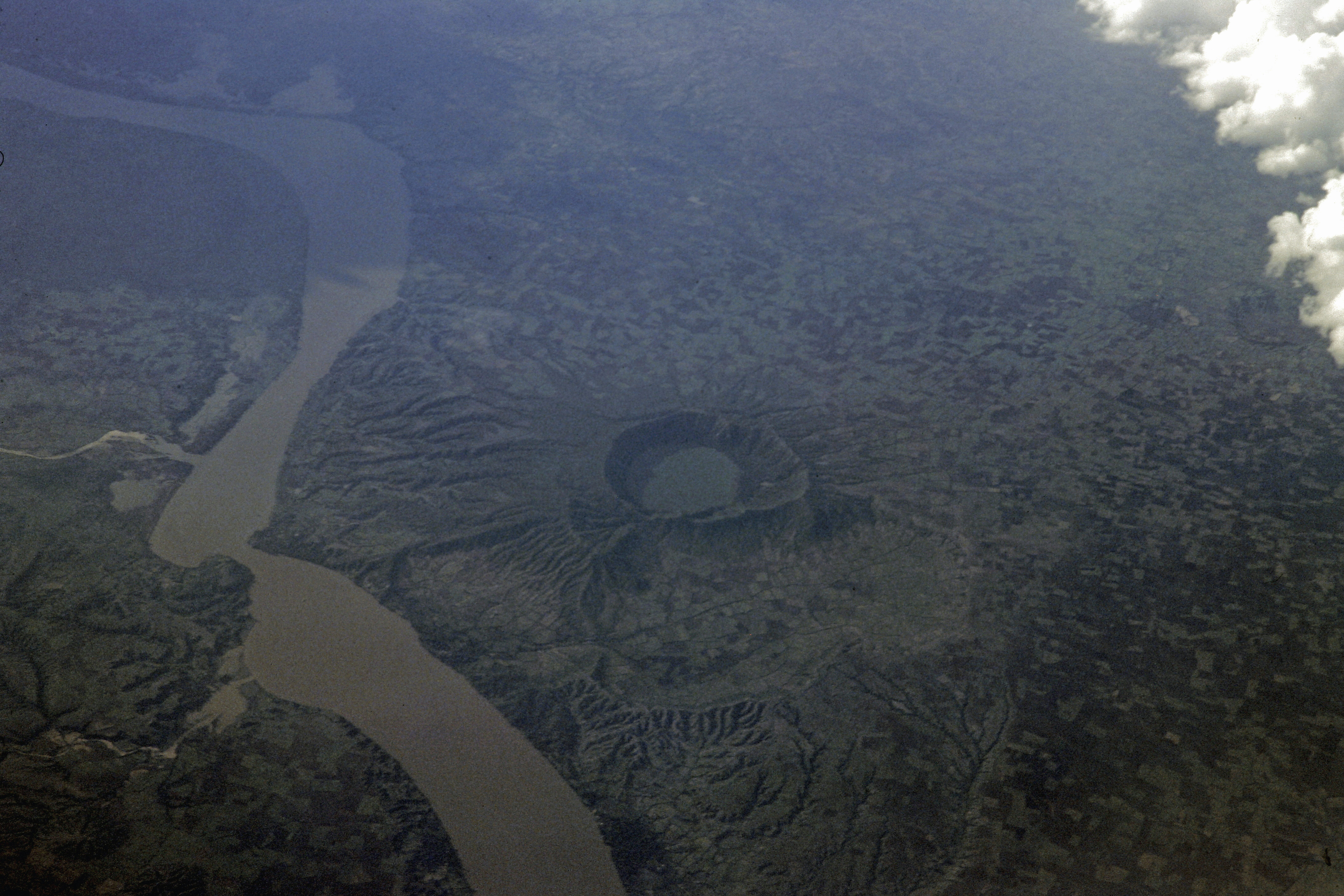
1980: River Chindwin 30 km NE of Monywa with Lower Chindwin crater lake

1. Hkamti
2. Htamanthi
3. Homalin
4. Mawlaik
5. Kalewa
6. Kalaymyo
7. Mingin
8. Monywa

== Environment ==
Much of Chindwin's course lies within mountain ranges and forests. Due to the difficulty of access, much of it remains unspoilt. The government of Burma recently created a very large (2,500 square mile) sanctuary for the endangered tiger within the Hukawng Valley.

== History ==
The mountain ranges to the west of the Chindwin are formidable, yet not totally impregnable to armies. The Kabaw valley saw many an invasion by the kingdom of Manipur to the west, most notably during the reign of King Garibaniwaj (1709–1748) when his army crossed over the Chindwin and the Mu, took Myedu, and reached as far as Sagaing opposite the capital Ava. The tables were turned in 1758 after King Alaungpaya ascended the Burmese throne. The Burmese army invaded and occupied Manipur and Assam marching across the western mountain ranges, and even encroached upon British India.

During World War II, when the Japanese had cut off sea access, the British army and other Allied forces under General Joseph Stilwell retreated on foot to India across the same mountains, with disastrous results, mainly due to disease and hunger. The Ledo Road was built across the Hukawng valley to supply China. The Chindwin was a major barrier both for the Japanese trying to invade India and for the Allied forces attempting to reoccupy Burma.

== Ethnography and culture ==
The chindwin river has a great impact on the culture of western Burma. Central Sino-Tibetan languages originated from valley areas of this river.

== Economics ==
The Chindwin is served by regular river-going vessels up to the town of Homalin. Teak forests within its drainage area have been a valuable resource since ancient times. The Hukawng Valley is known for its abundance of Burmese amber. Along the river, there are deposits of jade, but Hpakant in the headwaters of the Uyu river is the only place in the world where the finest jade - known as jadeite or imperial jade - is found, along with an abundance of fish.

== Bibliography ==
- J. G. Scott, Gazetteer of Upper Burma and the Shan States. 5 vols. Rangoon, 1900–1901
