= Kale District =

District in Sagaing Region, Burma

Coordinates: 23°11′N 94°04′E

- District
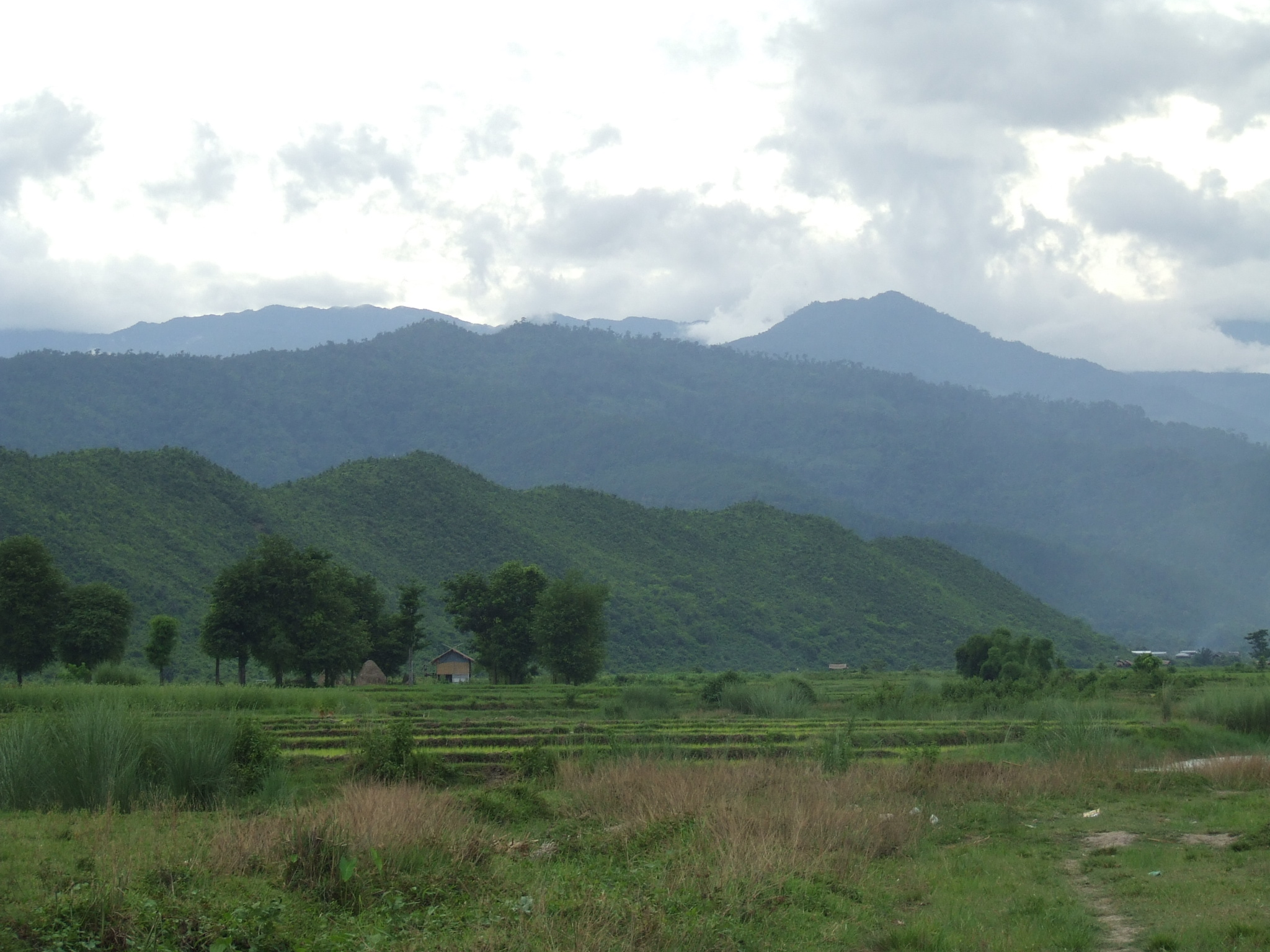
- Kale district in Sagaing Region

- Country: Myanmar
- Region: Sagaing Region
- No. of Townships: 3
- Capital: Kalay

Demographics
  - Ethnicities: Burmese; Chin; Zomi
- Time zone: UTC+6.30 (MST)

Kale District (also called Kalemyo District) is the westernmost district in Sagaing Division of Myanmar (Burma).

== Townships ==
Townships of Kale district

Kale
Kalewa
Mingin

Its administrative center is the city of Kalay (Kalaymyo). The district consists of three townships;

- Kale Township
- Kalewa Township
- Mingin Township

== Borders ==
To the west Kale District borders Falam District and Tedim District of Chin State in the west, to the north Mawlaik District, to the east Shwebo District, to the south Monywa District and finally Gangaw District of Magway Division.

== Economy ==
The area is supported by rice farming, fisheries and timbering. The main towns are Kalaymyo, Kalewa and Mingin.

== Religion ==
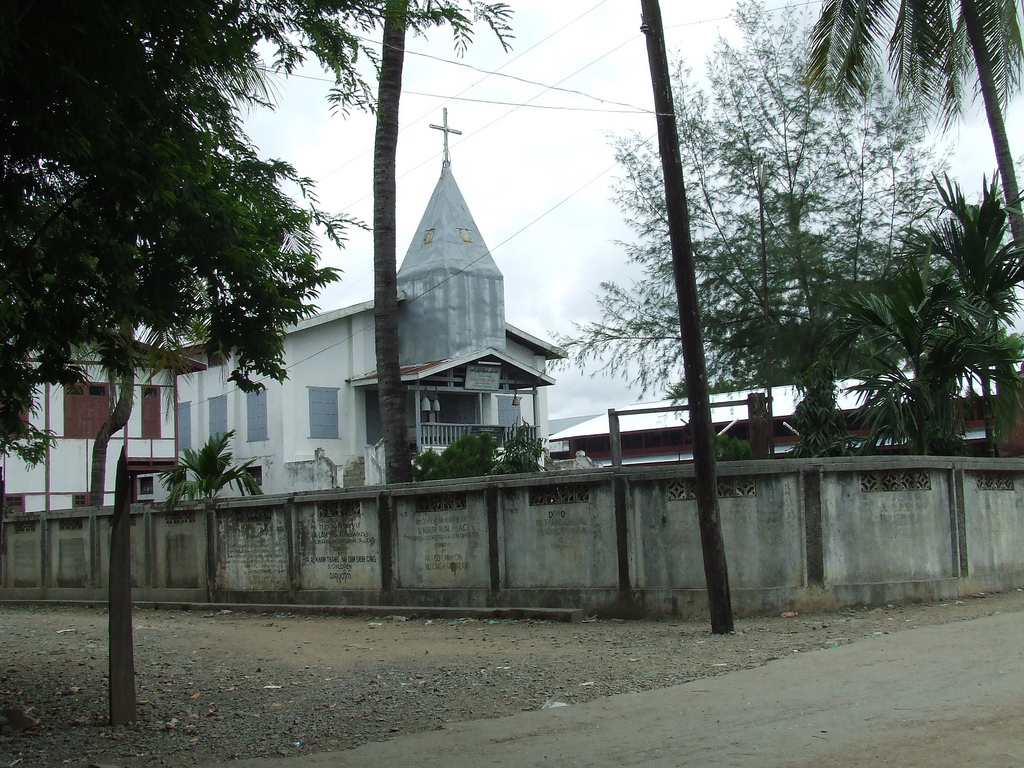
Tahan Baptish Church

Kale District is one of the most affluent Christian areas of Burma. 99% of inhabitants in Tahan are Christian even though Burma is a Buddhist country and 90% of the national population are Buddhist. Only 4% of the Burmese population are Christian. Kale has 116 Buddhist monasteries, 508 churches, a mosque, two Hindu temples, two Buddhist seminaries for nuns, five Buddhist nunneries and a joss house (Chinese communal temple). Also, there are over 50 churches in Tahan. This is the only place in Burma that you can see a church on every street corner and where Christmas is celebrated.
