= 2025 Bodoland Territorial Council election =

District election in India

- 22 September 2025

40 seats in the Bodoland Territorial Council 21 seats needed for a majority
- Registered: 2,658,477
- Turnout: 78.42%
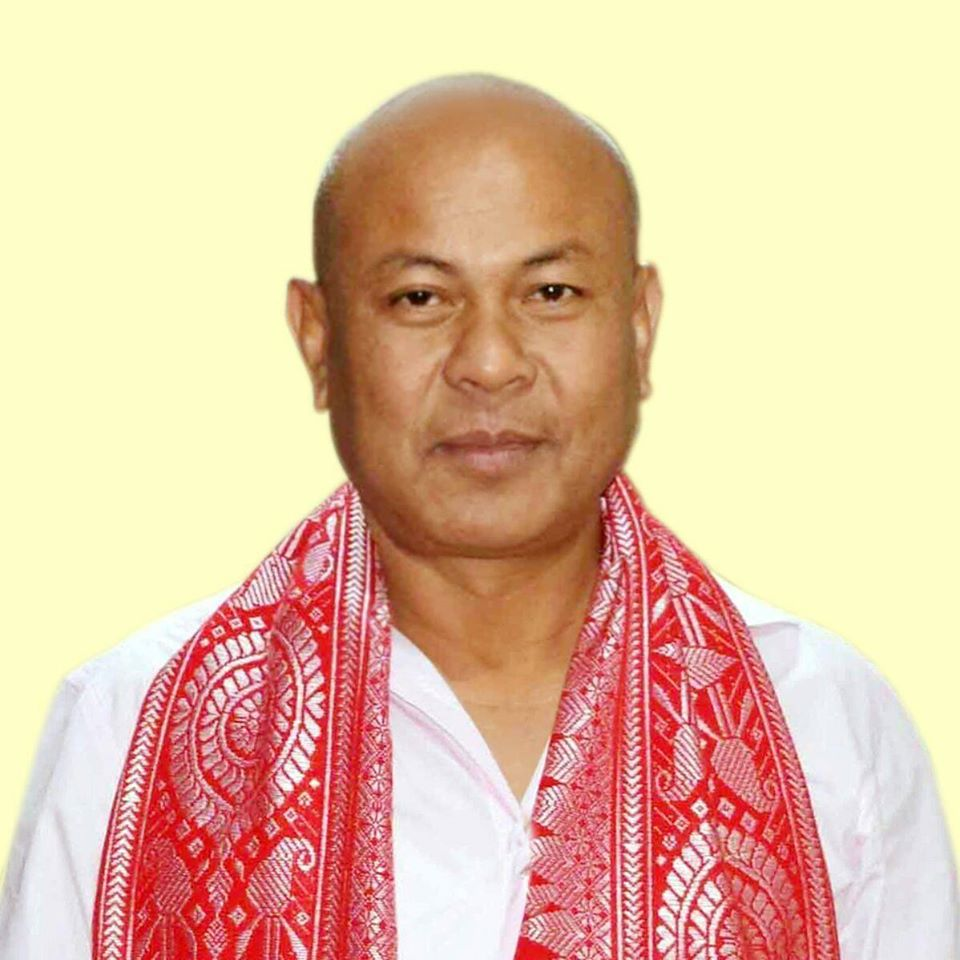

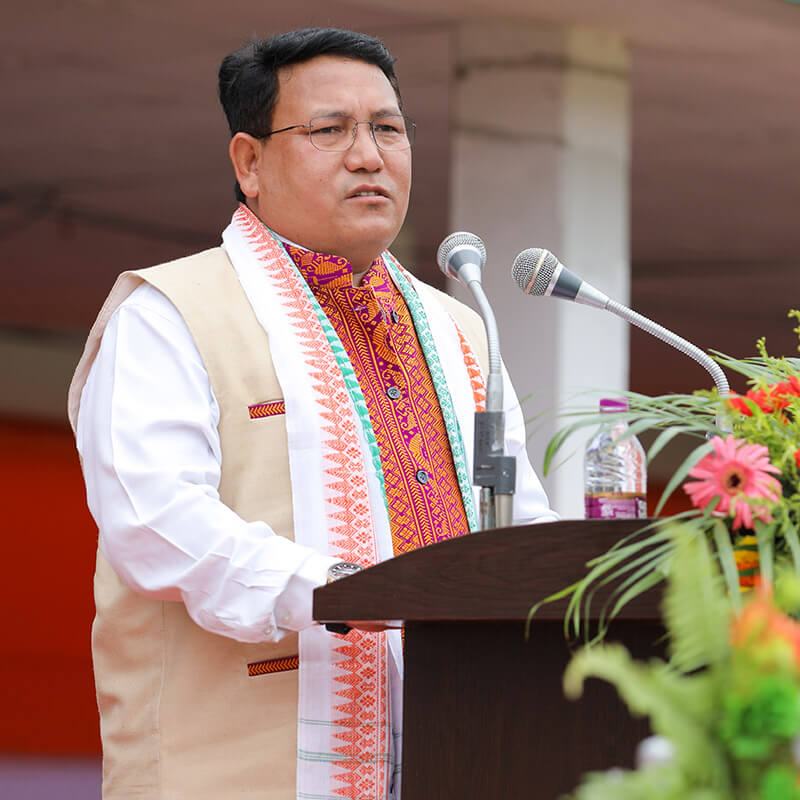

	Majority party	Minority party	Third party
Leader	Hagrama Mohilary	Pramod Boro	Undeclared
Party	BPF	UPPL	BJP
Leader's seat	Debargaon (won); Chirang Duars (lost)	Goibari (won); Dotma (lost)	None
Last election	17	12	9
Seats before	9	16	14
Seats won	28	7	5
Seat change	▲11	▼5	▼4

- Structure of the council after the election
Chief Executive Member before election
Pramod Boro
UPPL
Chief Executive Member after election
Hagrama Mohilary
BPF

The 2025 Bodoland Territorial Council election were held on 22 September 2025 to elect members to the Bodoland Territorial Council, the autonomous district council for the Bodoland Territorial Region in India. All 40 elected seats in the council were up for the election.

== Background ==
In the 2020 elections, the UPPL and BJP formed an alliance to form the council. Pramod Boro of the UPPL took oath as the Chief Executive Member after the election. The Bodoland People's Front formed the opposition following many defections of its members to the UPPL and BJP. The Indian National Congress and the AIUDF were wiped out in the previous election.

== Election schedule ==
The State Election Commission of Assam announced the schedule on 26 August 2025.

Poll Event	Schedule
Notification Date	26 August 2025
Last Date for filing nomination	2 September 2025
Scrutiny of nomination	4 September 2025
Last Date for Withdrawal of nomination	6 September 2025
Date of Poll	22 September 2025
Date of Counting of Votes	26 September 2025

== Parties and alliances ==
Party	Flag	Symbol	Leader	Seats contested
Bodoland People's Front			Hagrama Mohilary	40
United People's Party Liberal			Pramod Boro	40
Bharatiya Janata Party			Undeclared	30
Indian National Congress			Jadab Sawargiary	40
Gana Suraksha Party			Heera Saraniya	11

== Candidates ==
- BPF announced the first list of 22 candidates for the BTC elections on 4 August 2025
- UPPL announced the first list of 18 candidates for the BTC elections on 22 August 2025
- BPF announced the second list of 10 candidates for the BTC elections on 30 August 2025
- UPPL announced the second list of 16 candidates for the BTC elections on 31 August 2025
- BPF announced the third list of 8 candidates for the BTC elections on 31 August 2025
- BJP announced the first list of 28 candidates for the BTC elections on 31 August 2025
- UPPL announced the third list of 6 candidates for the BTC elections on 1 September 2025
- BJP announced the second list of 2 candidates for the BTC elections on 1 September 2025
- INC finalized 40 Candidates for BTC elections on 31st August 2025

Constituency									
Constituency		UPPL		BJP		BPF		INC	
1	Parbatjhora (ST)	UPPL	Prosen Brahma	BJP	Banendra Mushahary	BPF	Moon Moon Brahma	INC	Sahen Chandra Brahma
2	Guma	UPPL	Murshida Begum	BJP	Sajal Singha	BPF	Antaz Ali	INC	Abu Bakkar Ali
3	Srirampur	UPPL	Wilson Hasda	Did Not Contest		BPF	Mukleswar Ahmed	INC	Rafikul Islam Sheikh
4	Jamduar (ST)	UPPL	Saranjit Basumatary	BJP	Rahul Narzary	BPF	William Narzary	INC	Ranchana Basumatary
5	Soraibil (ST)	UPPL	Raju Kumar Narzary	BJP	Gossai Basumatary	BPF	Mritunjoy Narzary	INC	Rananjay Narzary
6	Kachugaon (ST)	UPPL	Ukhil Mushahary	BJP	Maheshwar Basumatary	BPF	Rabiram Narzary	INC	Kwrwm Mushahary
7	Fakirgram	UPPL	Afzal Haque Sarkar	BJP	Arup Kumar Dey	BPF	Azamul Hoque	INC	Husna Ara Begum
8	Dotma (ST)	UPPL	Pramod Boro	BJP	Manaranjan Brahma	BPF	Prakash Basumatary	INC	Dwimu Roje
9	Banargaon (ST)	UPPL	Rabiram Brahma	BJP	Rajib Brahma	BPF	Jubiraj Basumatary	INC	Matilal Basumatary
10	Debargaon (ST)	UPPL	Khampa Borgoyari	Did Not Contest		BPF	Hagrama Mohilary	INC	Mohini Mohan Basumatary
11	Baokhungri (ST)	UPPL	Ranjit Basumatary	Did Not Contest		BPF	Dhaneswar Goyari	INC	Sunil Narzary
12	Salaikati (ST)	UPPL	Lawrence Islary	BJP	Kabita Basumatary	BPF	Derhasat Basumatary	INC	Rajib Basumatary
13	Chirang (ST)	UPPL	Saikhong Basumatary	BJP	Swmkwr Brahma	BPF	Sukursing Muchahary	INC	Enos Iswary
14	Chirang Duars (ST)	UPPL	Khampa Borgoyari	Did Not Contest		BPF	Hagrama Mohilary	INC	Amoiyo Narzary
15	Kajalgaon (ST)	UPPL	Chandan Brahma	Did Not Contest		BPF	Paniram Brahma	INC	Sanjib Warie
16	Nichima (ST)	UPPL	Ranjit Basumatary	Did Not Contest		BPF	James Basumatary	INC	Agostin Narzary
17	Sobaijhar (ST)	UPPL	Phanin Boro	BJP	Prabhat Basumatary	BPF	Dhiraj Borgoyary	INC	Binimoy Basumatary
18	Manas Serfang (ST)	UPPL	Dhananjay Basumatary	BJP	Subhas Basumatary	BPF	Jangila Hazowary	INC	Abhinash Brahma
19	Thuribari	UPPL	Mohammad Ranju Ahmed	BJP	Ajoy Kumar Ray	BPF	Khalilur Rahaman	INC	Zamser Ali
20	Mathanguri	UPPL	Makhan Swargiary	BJP	Gautam Das	BPF	Begum Akhtara Ahmed	INC	Safiur Rahman
21	Salbari (ST)	UPPL	Jay Mushahary	BJP	Chakradhar Das	BPF	Diganta Goyary	INC	Buddhadev Phadangary
22	Koklabari (ST)	UPPL	Manto Baro	BJP	Ramen Madahi	BPF	Swmkhwr Boro	INC	Jagadish Madahi
23	Dihira	UPPL	Bhupen Bodosa	BJP	Manas Pratim Kalita	BPF	Augustush Tigga	INC	Bubul Das
24	Mushalpur (ST)	UPPL	Rakesh Brahma	BJP	Ridip Kumar Deka	BPF	Ansumwi Khungur Baro	INC	Dharmeswar Baro
25	Baganpara (ST)	UPPL	Kati Ram Baro	BJP	Rekharani Das Boro	BPF	Maneswar Brahma	INC	Kandarpa Das
26	Darrangajuli (ST)	UPPL	Jolen Daimary	BJP	Bijit Gwra Narzary	BPF	Emmanuel Muchahary	INC	Shejan Goyari
27	Nagrijuli	UPPL	Rabin Bala Biswas	BJP	Bhajan Das	BPF	Uttam Das	INC	Uday Biswas
28	Goibari (ST)	UPPL	Pramod Boro	Did Not Contest		BPF	Jiten Muchahary	INC	Rumi Singh Mushahari
29	Suklai Serfang (ST)	UPPL	Pradip Narzary	BJP	Ranen Narzary	BPF	Ganesh Kachary	INC	Surajit Basumatary
30	Goreswar (ST)	UPPL	Bipul Kumar Basumatary	BJP	Derhasar Narzary	BPF	Maheshwar Basumatary	INC	Bhebendra Nath Swargiary
31	Khwirwbari (ST)	UPPL	Dharani Boro	BJP	Madan Rabha	BPF	Lwmsrao Daimary	INC	Khagen Rabha
32	Bhergaon (ST)	UPPL	Daobaisa Boro	BJP	Jousrang Boro	BPF	Mansuma Basumatary	INC	Tenzing Bodosa
33	Nonwi Serfang	UPPL	Mariam Toppo	BJP	Sanjit Tanti	BPF	Paul Toppo	INC	Rohit Pariga
34	Khaling Duar (ST)	UPPL	Rabindra Boro	BJP	Arjun Daimari	BPF	Banjar Daimary	INC	Anil Doimari
35	Mwdwibari	UPPL	Ramesh Hazarika	BJP	Diganta Baruah	BPF	Jagadish Sarkar	INC	Himanga Saikia
36	Horisinga (ST)	UPPL	Sanjoy Swargiary	Did Not Contest		BPF	Tridip Daimari	INC	Chittaranjan Bhobora
37	Dwhwnsri (ST)	UPPL	Rujugwra Mushahary	Did Not Contest		BPF	Fresh Mushahari	INC	Rhilon Mushahary
38	Bhairabkunda (ST)	UPPL	Gobinda Basumatary	BJP	Minon Mushahary	BPF	Rihon Daimary	INC	Nowaz Basumatary
39	Pasnwi Serfang	UPPL	Ram Karan Gaur	BJP	Dipak Mour	BPF	Shyam Sundi	INC	Petrus Bagh
40	Rowta (ST)	UPPL	Nilut Swargiari	Did Not Contest		BPF	Charan Boro	INC	Swarangsha Daimari

== Results ==
=== Result by party ===
Source
Party	Contested	Won	-/+
Bodoland People's Front	40	28	▲11
United People's Party Liberal	40	7	▼5
Bharatiya Janata Party	30	5	▼4
Gana Suraksha Party	11	0	▼1
Indian National Congress	40	0	▼1
Independent		0	Steady
Total		40	

=== Result by constituency ===
Constituency		Winner			Runner up			Margin
No	Name	Name	Party	Votes	Name	Party	Votes	Margin
1	Parbatjhora (ST)	Moon Moon Brahma	BPF	23451	Prasen Kumar Brahma	UPPL	16301	7150
2	Guma	Antaz Ali	BPF	24272	Sajal Kumar Singha	BJP	16630	
3	Srirampur	Wilson Hasda	UPPL	20435	Mukleswar Ahmed	BPF	17847	
4	Jamduar (ST)	William Narzary	BPF	14570	Saranjit Basumatary	UPPL	13237	
5	Soraibil (ST)	Mritunjoy Narzary	BPF	17192	Raju Kumar Narzary	UPPL	13500	
6	Kachugaon (ST)	Rabiram Narzary	BPF	19964	Ukil Mushahary	UPPL	13769	
7	Fakiragram	Azamul Haque	BPF	20085	Arup Kumar Dey	BJP	18721	
8	Dotma (ST)	Prakash Basumatary	BPF	15441	Pramod Boro	UPPL	15163	
9	Banargaon (ST)	Jubiraj Basumatary	BPF	16379	Rajib Brahma	BJP	14516	
10	Debargaon (ST)	Hagrama Mohilary	BPF	28398	Kampa Borgoyari	UPPL	21203	
11	Baokhungri (ST)	Dhaneshwar Goyari	BPF	21416	Ranjit Basumatary	UPPL	14609	
12	Salakati (ST)	Derhasat Basumatary	BPF	18788	Lawrence Islary	UPPL	14460	
13	Chirang (ST)	Sukursing Muchahary	BPF	20262	Saikong Basumatary	UPPL	16258	
14	Chirang Duars (ST)	Khampa Borgoyari	UPPL	18885	Hagrama Mohilary	BPF	18440	
15	Kajalgaon (ST)	Paniram Brahma	BPF	27699	Chandan Barhma	UPPL	20315	
16	Nichima (ST)	James Basumatary	BPF	18897	Ranjit Basumatary	UPPL	16373	
17	Sobhaijhar (ST)	Dhiraj Borgoyary	BPF	19077	Phanin Boro	UPPL	14104	
18	Manas Serfang (ST)	Dhananjay Basumatary	UPPL	16505	Janggila Hazowary	BPF	14589	
19	Thuribari	Khalilur Rahaman	BPF	19783	Ajoy Kumar Ray	BJP	15695	
20	Mathanguri	Begum Akhtara Ahmed	BPF	24812	Gautam Das	BJP	20021	
21	Salbari (ST)	Diganta Goyary	BPF	29546	Joy Machahary	UPPL	16144	
22	Koklabari (ST)	Mantu Boro	UPPL	19399	Swgwmchar Baro	BPF	18097	
23	Dihira	Augustush Tigga	BPF	17795	Manash Pratim Kalita	BJP	17443	
24	Mushalpur (ST)	Rakesh Brahma	UPPL	24002	Ansmwi Khungar Boro	BPF	21417	
25	Baganpara (ST)	Rekharani Das Boro	BJP	22280	Kati Ram Baro	UPPL	21147	
26	Darrangajuli (ST)	Bijit Gwra Narzary	BJP	18565	Jolen Daimary	UPPL	15347	
27	Nagrijuli	Lakhi Das	BJP	18581	Rabindra Biswas	UPPL	13550	
28	Goibari (ST)	Pramod Boro	UPPL	30341	Jiten Mashahary	BPF	24819	
29	Suklai Serfang (ST)	Ganesh Kachary	BPF	18273	Ranendra Narzary	BJP	14902	
30	Goreswar (ST)	Maheshwar Basumatary	BPF	22274	Derhasar Narzary	BJP	19565	
31	Khwirwbari (ST)	Lwmsrao Daimary	BPF	15481	Madan Ch Rava	BJP	15378	
32	Bhergaon (ST)	Daobaisa Boro	UPPL	16998	Jouysrang Baro	BJP	15242	
33	Nonwi Serfang	Paul Toppo	BPF	11859	Sanjit Tanti	BJP	11516	
34	Khaling Duar (ST)	Arjun Daimary	BJP	17738	Rabindra Boro	UPPL	14925	
35	Mwdwibari	Diganta Baruah	BJP	18932	Jagadish Sarkar	BPF	18408	
36	Horisinga (ST)	Tridip Daimari	BPF	26812	Sanjaoy Swargiary	UPPL	21559	
37	Dwhwnsri (ST)	Fresh Mushahary	BPF	37167	Rujugra Mwchahary	UPPL	27260	
38	Bhairabkunda (ST)	Rihon Daimary	BPF	20277	Minon Mochahari	BJP	13832	
39	Pasnwi Serfang (ST)	Shyam Sundi	BPF	16438	Dipak Mour	BJP	16012	
40	Rowta (ST)	Charan Boro	BPF	34795	Dr. Nilut Swargiary	UPPL	28735	

== See also ==
- 2025 elections in India
