= Political parties in Assam =

Political parties in India

This is a list of political parties in Assam.

== Major national parties ==
- Bharatiya Janata Party (BJP)
- Aam Aadmi Party (AAP)
- Communist Party of India (Marxist)
- Indian National Congress (INC)

== Major regional parties ==
- All India United Democratic Front (AIUDF)
- Asom Gana Parishad (AGP)
- Bodoland People's Front (BPF)
- Raijor Dal (RD)
- United People's Party Liberal (UPPL)

== Minor regional parties ==
- All India Trinamool Congress (AITC)
- Anchalik Gana Morcha (AGM)
- Asom Bharatiya Janata Party (ABJP)
- Assam Jatiya Parishad (AJP)
- Barak Democratic Front (BDF)
- Communist Party of India
- CPI(ML) Liberation
- Gana Suraksha Party
- Ganashakti Party (GP)
- Liberal Democratic Party (LDP)
- Marxist Manch (MM)
- Minority People's Party (MPP)
- Nationalist Congress Party (NCP)
- Plain Tribals Council of Assam (PTCA)
- Rabha Jatiya Aikya Manch (RJAM)
- Tiwa Jatiya Aikya Manch (TJAM)
- United Tribal Nationalist Liberation Front (UTNLF)

== Defunct regional parties ==
- All People's Party (APP)
- Peoples Democratic Party of Assam (PDPA)
- Asom Gana Parishad (Pragatishel) (AGP-P)
- Asom Jatiya Sanmilan (AJS)
- Autonomous State Demand Committee (ASDC)
- Autonomous State Demand Committee (Progressive) (ASDC-P)
- Autonomous State Demand Committee (United) (ASDC-U)
- Bodo People's Progressive Front (BPPF)
- Gana Mukti Sangram Asom (GMSA) (merged with Raijor Dal)
- Indian Congress (Socialist) – Sarat Chandra Sinha
- Krishak Banuva Panchayat (KBP)
- Natun Asom Gana Parishad (NAGP)
- Plain Tribals Council of Assam (Progressive) (PTCA-P)
- Purbanchaliya Loka Parishad (PLP)
- Trinamool Gana Parishad (TGP)
- United Minorities Front (UMF) (merged with All India United Democratic Front (AIUDF))
- United People's Party of Assam (UPPA)
