= 2015 Bodoland Territorial Council election =

District election in India

← 2010	8 April 2015	2020 →

All 40 seats in the Bodoland Territorial Council
- Turnout: 2,065,956 (78.18%)
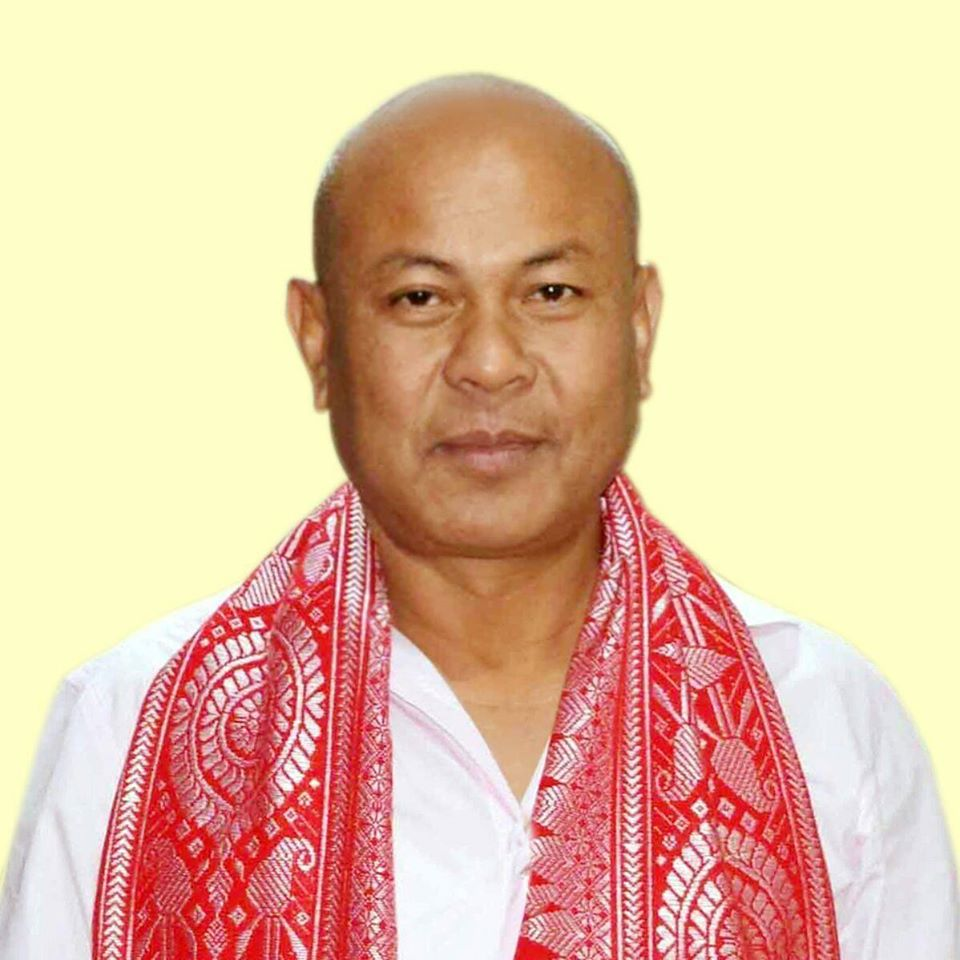

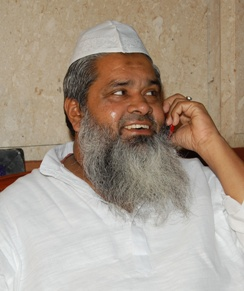

	First party	Second party	Third party
Leader	Hagrama Mohilary	Badruddin Ajmal	undeclared
Party	BPF	AIUDF	BJP
Leader's seat	Debargaon		none
Seats won	20	4	1
Seat change	▼11	▲4	▲1
Popular vote	441,437	58,692	200,494

- Structure after the election
Chief Executive Member before election
Hagrama Mohilary
BPF
Chief Executive Member after election
Hagrama Mohilary
BPF

The 2015 Bodoland Territorial Council election was held on Wednesday, 8 April 2015 to elect the 3rd council of the Bodoland Territorial Area Districts. All 40 seats in the legislative assembly were set up for election. Bodoland People's Front won the election for the third consecutive term by winning 20 seats and 28.5 percent of the votes. BPF also lost 11 seats in contrast to the last election in which they won 31 seats.

Independent candidates won 15 seats, followed by AIUDF winning 4 seats and 1 by the BJP. The INC, which was the ruling party of Assam at the time, did not win a seat.

== Parties Contested ==
Party	Flag	Symbol	Leader	Contesting Seats
Bodoland People's Front			Hagrama Mohilary	40
Indian National Congress			Tarun Gogoi	40
Bharatiya Janata Party			Rameshwar Teli	40
All India United Democratic Front			Badruddin Ajmal	8
Communist Party of India (Marxist)			Prakash Karat	7
Asom Gana Parishad			Prafulla Kumar Mahanta	6

== Synopsis ==
The 2015 elections shows BPF facing stiff competition from various other political parties as contrast to their domination in the last two elections. This time the BJP and AIUDF too fielded their candidates in the elections. The BJP tried hard to gain the ground by conducting a high voltage campaign, but the party had to satisfy itself by winning only one seat out of 40 seats, while AIUDF won 4.

Most of the competition to BPF came from non-Bodo candidates, and the Peoples Coordination for Democratic Rights (PCDR). PCDR, formed by the All Bodoland Student Union (ABSU), Bodoland Peoples Progressive Front (BPPF)—in collaboration with the Pro-talk National Democratic Front of Bodoland (NDFB), contested the elections as an independent party. PCDR came out of the Bodo community, who claims it as a response to the widespread corruption by the BPF party, and its dictatorship in the governing process. The PCDR, which contested as an independent, had snatched seven seats from the BPF. While the ruling Indian National Congress in Assam could not win even a single seat.

== Result ==
Party	Contested	Won	+/-	% of votes
Bodoland People's Front	40	20	▼11	28.5
All India United Democratic Front	8	4	▲4	4
Bharatiya Janata Party	40	1	▲1	13
Asom Gana Parishad	6	0	Steady	0.50
Indian National Congress	40	0	▼3	6
Communist Party of India (Marxist)	7	0	Steady	1
Independents	191	15	▲9	47
Total			40	

=== Winning candidates ===
S.No	Constituency	Elected Candidate's Name	Party	Margin
1.	Parbatjhora	Jatindra Nath Brahma	All India United Democratic Front	
2.	Guma	Mominur Islam	All India United Democratic Front	
3.	Srirampur	Abdul Khaleque Mandal	Independent	
4.	Jamduar	Jiron Basumatary	Independent	
5.	Soraibil	Mrityunjoy Narzary	BPF	
6.	Kachugaon	Banamali Rabha	Independent	
7.	Dotma	Jyatirinda Brahma	Independent	
8.	Fakiragram	Abdul Ali Mondal	AIUDF	
9.	Banargaon	Rajib Brahma	BPF	
10.	Deborgaon	Hagrama Mohilary	BPF	
11.	Baukhungri	Dhaneswar Goyary	BPF	
12.	Salakati	Aparna Das	Independent	
13.	Chirang	Maoti Brahma Hazowary	Independent	
14.	Chirang Duars	Kampa Borgoyari	BPF	
15.	Kajalgaon	Rwgwra Narzary	Independent	4028
16.	Nichima	Nirmal Kumar Brahma	Independent	
17.	Sobhaijhar	Guneshwar Goyari	Independent	
18.	Manas Serfang	Atin Hajong	Independent	
19.	Thuribari	Maheneswar Ray	Independent	
20.	Mathanguri	Gautam Das	BPF	
21.	Salbari	Chakradar Das	Independent	
22.	Koklabari	Anip Basumatary	Independent	
23.	Dihira	Ghanashyam Das	Independent	
24.	Musalpur	Ansumwi Khungur Boro	BPF	
25.	Baganpara	Phalindra Basumatary	BPF	
26.	Darangajuli	Bijit Gawra Narzary	BPF	
27.	Nagrijuli	Dharma Narayan Das	BJP	
28.	Goibari	Deben Boro	BPF	
29.	Suklai Serfang	Ganesh Kachary	BPF	
30.	Goreswar	Maheswar Basumatary	Independent	
31.	Khwirwbari	Lwmshrao Daimary	BPF	
32.	Bhergaon	Nershwn Baro	BPF	
33.	Nonwi Serfang	Suresh Tanti	BPF	
34.	Khaling Duar	Bonjar Daimari	BPF	
35.	Mwdwibari	Jagadish Sarkar	BPF	
36.	Horisinga	Tridip Daimari	BPF	
37.	Dwhwnsri	Robert Narzary	AIUDF	
38.	Bhairabkunda	Ripen Daimari	BPF	
39.	Pasnwi Serfang	Shyam Sundi	BPF	
40.	Rowta	Alindra Mushahary	BPF	

== Members of the Executive Committee (2015-2020 session) ==
The members of the Executive Committee up to 27 April 2020 were as follows:

	Executive Member	Portfolio
1.	Hagrama Mohilary; Chief Executive Member	PWD.; P & RD.; WPT & BC.; IBA.
2.	Kampa Borogoyary; Deputy Chief Executive Member	Forest.; Tourism.; Education.
3.	Lwmsraw Daimary	PHE.; Museum & Archaeology.; Excise.
4.	Bonjar Daimary	Food Civil Supplies & Consumer Affairs.; Cinema.; Cultural Affairs.
5.	Rajib Brahma	Irrigation.; WPT & BC (Plan Fund).
6.	Mritunjay Narzary	Social Welfare.; Information & Public Relations.
7.	Alindra Mushahary	Land Revenue.; Disaster Management.; Printing & Stationery.; Market & Fairs.
8.	Ganesh Kochary	Health Services.; Cottage Industry.
9.	Doneswar Goyary	Urban Development.; Town & Country Planning.; Sports & Youth Welfare.
10.	Ansumwi Khungur Boro	Agriculture.; Weight & Measure.
11.	Deben Boro	Handloom & Textile.; Sericulture.
12.	Shyam Sundi	Fishery.; Animal Husbandry & Veterinary.; Labour & Employment.
13.	Jagadish Sarkar	Soil Conservation.; Transport.; Cooperation.
14.	Maheswar Basumatary	Water Resources.; Library Services.

== See also ==
2015 elections in India
