= Bodo Liberation Tigers Force =

Dissolved armed militant group in Assam, India

- Flag of the Bodo Liberation Tigers Force
- Leader: Prem Singh Brahma
- Dates active: 18 June 1996 – 6 December 2003
- Active regions: Assam, India
- Ideology: Bodo nationalism Separatism
- Wars: the Insurgency in Northeast India

The Bodo Liberation Tigers Force (abbreviated BLTF), also known as the Bodo Liberation Tigers (abbreviated BLT), was an armed militant group that operated in the Bodo-dominated regions of Assam, India. The BLTF was founded on 18 June 1996 by Prem Singh Brahma and Hagrama Mohilary. Hagrama Mohilary was the chief of the outfit.

The group initially wanted to carve out a separate autonomy of Bodoland in Assam, but surrendered with the establishment of Bodoland Territorial Council, an upgrade of the Bodo Autonomous Council.

The leaders of the BLT, together with the leaders of the All Bodo Students' Union, formed a political party called Bodo People's Progressive Front.

== Memorandum of Settlement ==
On 10 February 2003, representatives of the BLTF and the governments of Assam and India reached an agreement and signed a Memorandum of Settlement (MoS) in New Delhi. 2,641 cadres surrendered and laid down their arms on 6 December 2003 at Kokrajhar. A vast majority of them were absorbed in the Central Reserve Police Force. On the following day, an interim 12‑member executive council of the Bodoland Territorial Council (BTC) was formed in Kokrajhar.

The main provisions of the MoS related to "the creation of the Bodoland Territorial Council, an autonomous self-governing body within the State of Assam and under the provisions of the Sixth Schedule of the Constitution of India to fulfill economic, educational and linguistic aspirations, socio-cultural and ethnic identity of the Bodos, and to speed up the infrastructure development in BTC area". The BTC would comprise 3,082 villages in four districts— Kokrajhar and the three yet to be created: Chirang, Udalguri and Baska. The BTC would have 40 elected representatives and the Assam government would nominate six more. Of the elected representatives, 30 seats would be reserved for tribal leaders, five for other indigenous Assamese leaders, and the remaining five would be open for general contest.

== See also ==
- Bodoland
- National Democratic Front of Bodoland
