= 2020 Bodoland Territorial Council election =

District election in India

- 7–10 December 2025

40 seats in the Bodoland Territorial Council 21 seats needed for a majority
- Turnout: 79%
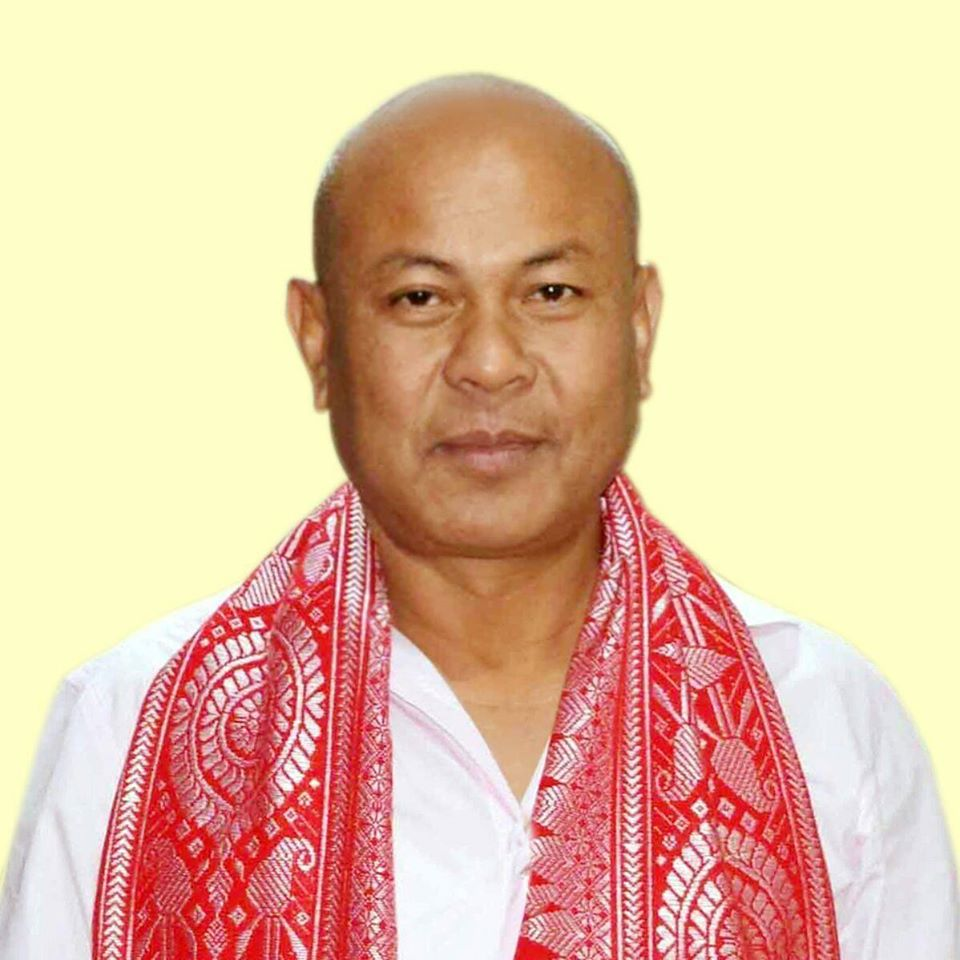

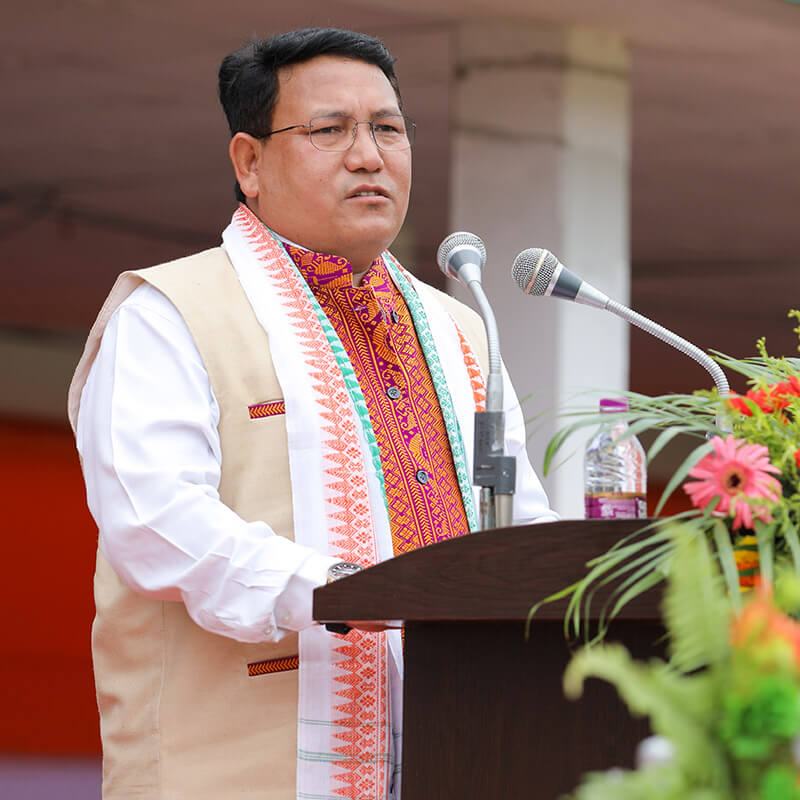

	Majority party	Minority party	Third party
Leader	Hagrama Mohilary	Pramod Boro	Undeclared
Party	BPF	UPPL	BJP
Leader's seat	Debargaon, Kachugaon (both won)	Koklabari, Goibari (both won)	None
Last election	20	Did Not Contest	1
Seats won	17	12	9
Seat change	▼3	▲12	▲8

- Structure after the election
Chief Executive Member before election
Hagrama Mohilary
BPF
Chief Executive Member after election
Pramod Boro
UPPL

The 2020 Bodoland Territorial Council election was held between 7 and 10 December 2020 to elect members to the Bodoland Territorial Council, the autonomous district council for the Bodoland Territorial Region in India. All 40 elected seats in the council were up for election.

== Background ==
On the previous council, the BPF and BJP were in an asymmetrical alliance, with the BPF as the major partner. The BJP on the other hand was in power at the state and center.

== Scheduled date and postponement ==
The elections were due to be held on 4 April 2020, but were postponed due to the global COVID-19 pandemic.

The term of the current council was due to expire on 27 April 2020. There were two possible options for the council after that date, those being the term of the current council being extended by up to six months, or the Bodoland Territorial Region being placed under President's rule by the Governor of Assam. On 27 April 2020, it was announced that Bodoland would come under Governor's rule until a new council is elected.

== Election schedule ==
Elections to 40 seats in Bodoland Territorial council were held in two phases.

Phase 1 (7 Dec 2020)
21 seats in Udalguri and Baksa districts.
Phase 2 (10 Dec 2020)
19 seats in Chirang and Kokrajhar districts.

Election results were announced on 12 December 2020.

== Voting ==
During phase 1, Assam State election Commission puts voting percentage at 77%.

== Exit Polls ==
Polling firm/Link/Portal	Date	BPF	UPPL	BJP	INC	Others
Lok-Poll	11 December 2020	10 - 12	12 - 14	8 - 10	3 - 5	0 - 4

== Results ==
No party has won a majority in the elections, but the BPF has emerged as the single largest party.

=== Party summary ===
Party	Contested	Won	+/-
Bodoland People's Front	37	17	▼3
United People's Party Liberal	40	12	▲12
Bharatiya Janata Party	26	9	▲8
Indian National Congress	13	1	▲1
Gana Suraksha Party	35	1	▲1
All India United Democratic Front	7	0	▼4
Asom Gana Parishad	1	0	Steady
Independents		0	▼15
Total		40	

=== Winning candidates ===
S.No	Constituency	Elected Candidate's Name	Party	Margin
1.	Parbatjhora	Moon Moon Brahma	BPF	7776
2.	Guma	Rahindra Brahma	BPF	3789
3.	Srirampur	Sajal Kumar Singha	INC	7499
4.	Jamduar	Reo Reoa Narzihary	BPF	5842
5.	Soraibil	Mrityunjoy Narzary	BPF	3527
6.	Kachugaon	Ukil Mushahary	UPPL	507
7.	Dotma	Prakash Basumatary	BPF	1485
8.	Fakiragram	Arup Kumar Dey	BJP	2088
9.	Banargaon	Rajib Brahma	BPF	4857
10.	Deborgaon	Hagrama Mohilary	BPF	1982
11.	Baukhungri	Dhaneswar Goyary	BPF	3835
12.	Salakati	Derhasat Basumatary	BPF	4912
13.	Chirang	Saikong Basumatary	BPF	1339
14.	Chirang Duars	Ranjit Basumatary	UPPL	2143
15.	Kajalgaon	Paniram Brahma	BPF	3996
16.	Nichima	James Basumatary	BPF	2781
17.	Sobhaijhar	Prabhat Basumatary	BPF	2006
18.	Manas Serfang	Dhananjay Basumatary	BPF	1240
19.	Thuribari	Abhiram Mahanayak	BJP	1859
20.	Mathanguri	Gautam Das	BJP	5123
21.	Salbari	Joy Muchahary	BPF	448
22.	Koklabari	Pramod Boro	UPPL	3734
23.	Dihira	Ghanashyam Das	GSP	1519
24.	Musalpur	Rakesh Brahma	UPPL	3641
25.	Baganpara	Katiram Boro	UPPL	4029
26.	Darangajuli	Bijit Gawra Narzary	BPF	4347
27.	Nagrijuli	Dharma Narayan Das	BJP	644
28.	Goibari	Pramod Boro	UPPL	5789
29.	Suklai Serfang	Ranendra Narzary	BJP	1674
30.	Goreswar	Pabitra Kumar Boro	UPPL	1605
31.	Khwirwbari	Bhabendra Boro	BJP	1119
32.	Bhergaon	Daobaicha Boro	UPPL	6528
33.	Nonwi Serfang	Sanjit Tanti	BJP	2008
34.	Khaling Duar	Dilip Kumar Boro	UPPL	1150
35.	Mwdwibari	Diganta Baruah	BJP	1539
36.	Horisinga	Sonjoy Swargiary	UPPL	1334
37.	Dwhwnsri	Fresh Muchahari	BPF	2736
38.	Bhairabkunda	Gobinda Basumatary	UPPL	1082
39.	Pasnwi Serfang	Dipak Mour	BJP	4471
40.	Rowta	Dr. Nilut Swargiary	UPPL	6353

== Post-election executive formation ==
On the 13th of December, the BJP announced that it has agreed to support efforts by the UPPL to form an executive position. The leader of the UPPL, Pramod Boro, became the new Chief Executive Member of the Bodoland Territorial Council on the 15th of December.

== See also ==
- 2020 elections in India
