= Transport in Bodoland =

Transportation in the Bodoland is regulated by the transportation department of the Bodoland Territorial Council.

The vast majority of passenger travel occurs by automobile for shorter distances, and for some people railroad, for longer distances as there are no airway services.

== Bodoland Transport Service (BTS) ==
In a bid to improve communication system and employment generation in the region, the government of BTC launched the Bodoland Transport Service, initially with four buses.

== Revenue ==
The BTC transport department earns revenue of nearly Rs 80 crore a year from the four districts of Kokrajhar, Chirang, Baksa and Udalguri in the Bodoland Territorial Areas Districts (BTAD). New vehicles are also distributed under the Bodoland Vikash Yojana for employment of youths.
