= Gana Suraksha Party =

- Abbreviation: GSP
- Leader: Heera Saraniya
- President: Dilip Kumar Sarania
- General Secretary: Abdul Badsha
- Founder: Heera Saraniya
- Headquarters: Dighilipar, Tamulpur, Baksa, Assam
- Ideology: Secularism; Regionalism; Progressivism; Developmentalism
- Political position: Centre
- Colours: Yellow, White & Green
- ECI Status: Recognized Party
- Alliance: Independent politician (2019-2024) (Lok Sabha; UPPL+ (2019-present) (Bodoland Territorial Council); NEDA (2019-present)
- Seats in Lok Sabha: 0 / 543
- Seats in Bodoland Territorial Council: 0 / 40

Website
- https://ganasurakshaparty.org

Gana Suraksha Party (GSP) (Trans: People's Protection Party) was founded by former Lok Sabha MP, Heera Saraniya and it is a significant party in Bodoland Territorial Council, an autonomous council for the Bodoland Territorial Region in Assam.

== Electoral performance ==
Bodoland Territorial Council
Year	Party leader	Seats contested	Seats won	Change in seats	Percentage of votes	Vote swing	Popular vote	Result
2020	Heera Saraniya	35	1	▲1				Government, Later Opposition
2025	Heera Saraniya	11	0	▼1				Lost
