= Victor Kumar Das =

Indian politician (born 1989)

Member, Assam Legislative Assembly
- Incumbent
- Assumed office 4 May 2026
- Constituency: Goreshwar

Personal details
- Party: Bharatiya Janata Party

Victor Kumar Das (born 1989) is an Indian politician from Assam. He is a member of the Assam Legislative Assembly from the Goreshwar Assembly constituency in new Tamulpur district, carved out of the erstwhile Baksa district, representing the Bharatiya Janata Party.

== Early life ==
Das is from Goreswar, Tamulpur district, Assam. He is the son of Mahendra Nath Das. He earned his BA from Krishna Kanta Handiqui State Open University (KKHSOU) in 2024. He is self employed and his wife is in government employment. He declared assets worth Rs.34 lakhs in his affidavit to the Election Commission of India.

== Career ==
Das won the Goreshwar Assembly constituency representing the Bharatiya Janata Party in the 2026 Assam Legislative Assembly election. He polled 98,108 votes and defeated his nearest rival, Pabitra Kumar Baro of the United People's Party Liberal, by a margin of 69,249 votes.
