= Goreswar Assembly constituency =

Assembly constituency of Assam

Goreswar
- Constituency No. 44 for the Assam Legislative Assembly

Constituency details
- Country: India
- Region: Northeast India
- State: Assam
- District: Tamulpur
- Lok Sabha constituency: Darrang–Udalguri
- Established: 2023
- Reservation: None

Member of Legislative Assembly
- 16th Assam Legislative Assembly
- Incumbent Victor Kumar Das

Goreswar Assembly constituency is one of the 126 assembly constituencies of Assam a north east state of India. It was newly formed in 2023.

== Election Results ==
=== 2026 ===
2026 Assam Legislative Assembly election: Goreswar
Party	Candidate	Votes	%	±%
BJP	Victor Kumar Das	98,108	57.54	
UPPL	Pabitra Kr. Baro	28,859	16.93	
CPI(M)	Bapu Ram Boro	28,273	16.58	
NOTA	None of the above	2,022	1.19	
Margin of victory		69,249	40.61	
Turnout		170,498		
Rejected ballots				
Registered electors				
BJP win (new seat)				

== See also ==
- List of constituencies of Assam Legislative Assembly
