= Kanakeswar Narzary =

Indian politician (1943–2003)

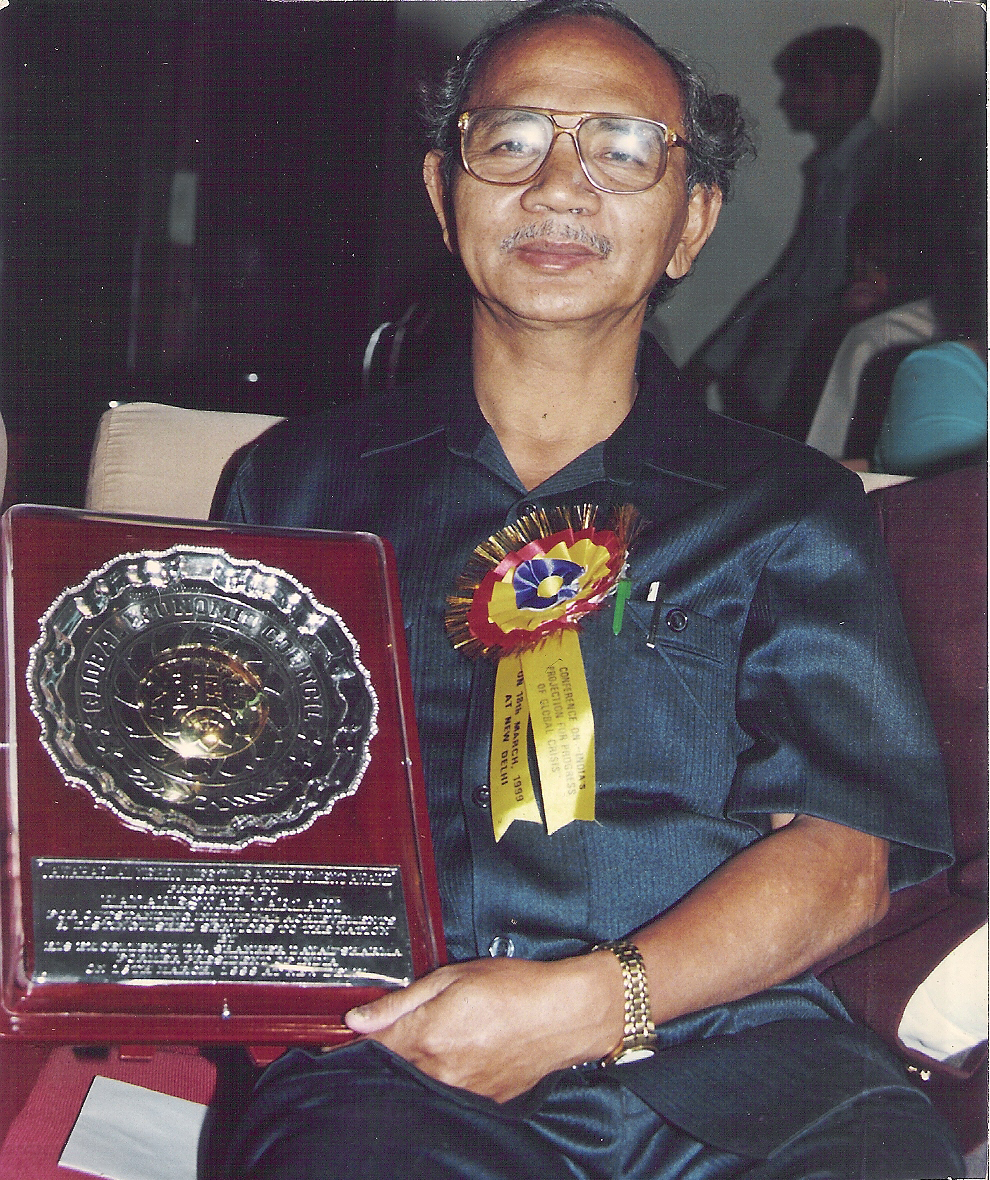
- Narzary Receiving "Jawaharlal Nehru Life-time Achievement Award" at New Delhi, 1999.
- Born: 2 January 1943; Gwmwbil (Tengaigaon) Village, Serfanguri Police Station, Kokrajhar District.
- Died: 12 October 2003 (aged 60)
- Other name: "Khungkhra"
- Spouse: Hirabai Narzary
- Children: 3
- Awards: Jawaharlal Nehru Life-time Achievement Award by Global Economic Council, 18 March 1999 at New Delhi, India.

Kanakeswar Narzary (2 January 1943 – 12 October 2003) was an Indian politician and co-founder of All Bodo Students' Union alongside Baneswar Basumatary. He was the first General Secretary of ABSU.

He was born on 2 January 1943 at Tengaigaon (Gwmwbil) village under Serfanguri police station of Kokrajhar district in Assam. He was the son of Narayan Narzary and Dwislung Narzary. He died on 12 October 2003 at a private nursing home in Kolkata.

His early education started at Gosainichina village. After passing the final examination of MV School from there, he studied at Sapatgram Amalgamated Academy and passed his matriculation examination in 1964. He passed his P.U examination in 1965 and BA in Political science with honours from Kokrajhar College in 1968.

Since his school days, Kanakeswar Narzary was an active member of student organization. In 1967, he was associated with various meetings for the formation of ABSU. In this year, when All Bodo Students' Union was formally formed, he became the General Secretary of the union. Thereafter, he became the Convenor of Young Plains Tribal Council of Assam. Later on he became the Convenor of Progressive Plains Tribal Council of Assam. After continuing therefore sometime, he became the Convenor of United Tribal Nationalist Liberation Front.

On 19 June 1996, he became the Chief of Bodoland Autonomous Council. On 18 March 1999, he was awarded Jawaharlal Nehru Life Time Achievement Award by Global Economic Council for his Outstanding Individual Achievement and Distinguished Services to the Nation. He also became the Chairman of UBNLF till his death.
