= Kekerikuchi =

Village in Assam, India

Kekerikuchi Kekorikuchi
- Village
- Map of Assam Kekerikuchi (India)
- Coordinates: 26.5726°N 91.6105°E
- Country: India
- State: Assam
- District: Tamulpur
- Region: Tamulpur

Area
  - Total: 404.46 ha (999.4 acres)
- Elevation: 46 m (151 ft)

Population (2011)
  - Total: 1,867
  - Density: 461.6/km^{2} (1,196/sq mi)

Languages
  - Official: Assamese
- Time zone: UTC+5:30 (IST)
- Postal code: 781376
- STD Code: 03624
- Vehicle registration: AS-28
- Census code: 304413

Kekerikuchi is a census village in Tamulpur district, Assam, India. As per the 2011 Census of India, Kekerikuchi has a total population of 1,867 people including 927 males and 940 females.

On January 13, 1998, the night of Uruka, Boro terrorists killed 18 people in the village of Kekerikuchi. Since then, the villagers of Kekerikuchi don't celebrate the Bhogali Bihu, a major festive of Assamese nation.
