= Bahbari =

Village in Assam, India

- Village
- Map of Assam Bahbari (India)
- Coordinates: 26.7501°N 91.5475°E
- Country: India
- State: Assam
- District: Tamulpur
- Tehsil: Tamulpur

Area
  - Total: 317.74 ha (785.2 acres)

Population (2011)
  - Total: 4,214
  - Density: 1,326/km^{2} (3,435/sq mi)

Languages
  - Official: Assamese
- Time zone: UTC+5:30 (IST)
- Postal code: 781360
- STD Code: 03623
- Vehicle registration: AS-28
- Census code: 304621

Bahbari is a census village in Tamulpur district, Assam, India. According to the 2011 Census of India, the Bahbari village has a total population of 4,214 people including 2,150 males and 2,064 females with a literacy rate of 68.58%.
