= Sansuma Khunggur Bwiswmuthiary =

Indian politician (born 1960)

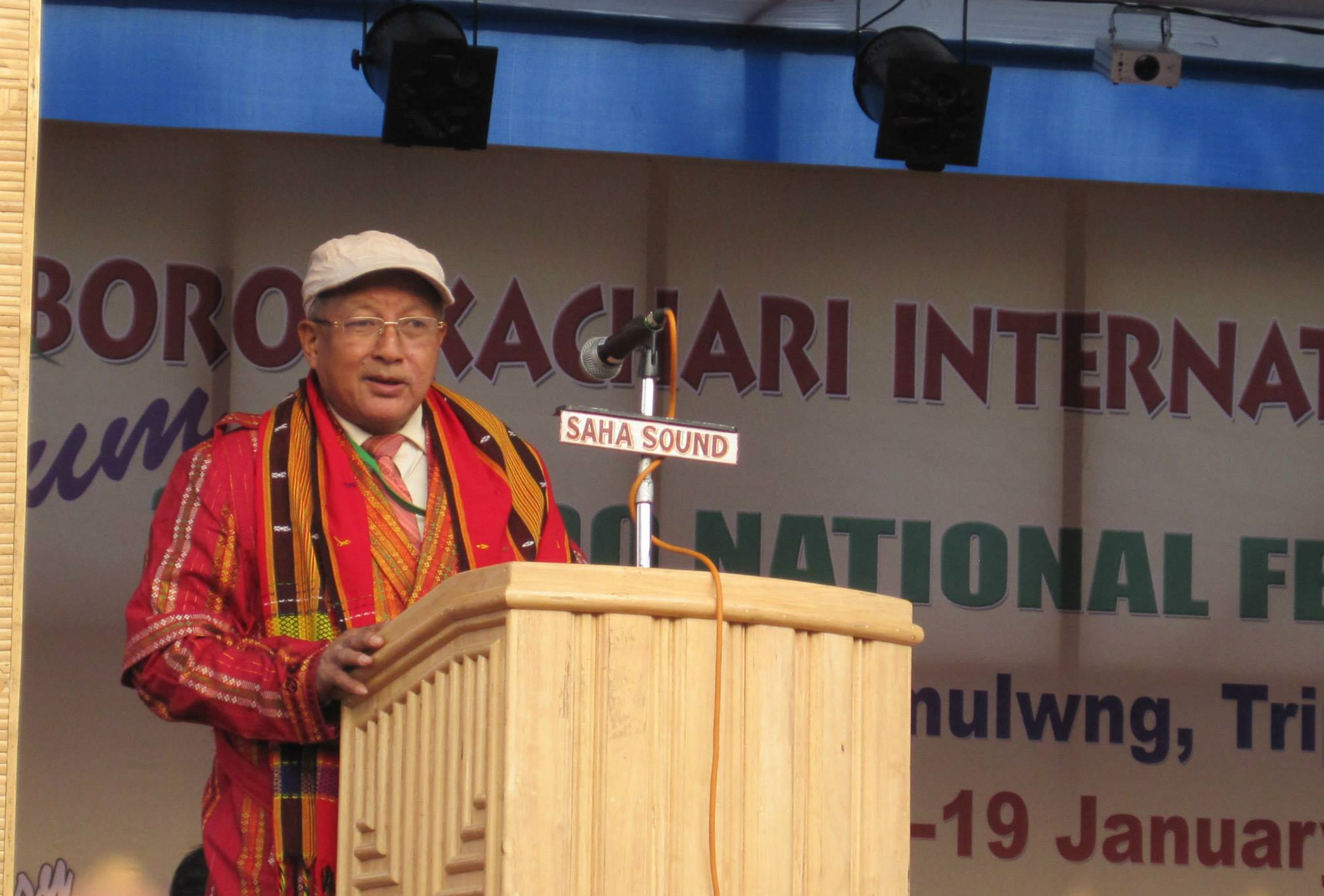
- Bwiswmuthiary at the Borok-Kachari International Festival 2011 in Tripura

Member of Parliament, Lok Sabha
- In office 10 March 1998 – 16 May 2014
- Preceded by: Louis Islary
- Succeeded by: Heera Saraniya
- Constituency: Kokrajhar

Personal details
- Born: 1 January 1960 (age 66) Kokrajhar, Assam
- Party: Bodoland People's Front
- Spouse: Uttara Bwiswmuthiary
- Children: 4
- Education: Guwahati University (B.A. (Hons. in Political Science))
- As of 25 September, 2006

Sansuma Khunggur Bwiswmuthiary (born 1 January 1960) is a former Lok Sabha MP. He was elected from Kokrajhar in Assam as an independent in 1998, 1999 and 2004. In 2009, he won as a Bodoland People's Front candidate, as part of the United Progressive Alliance.

Bwiswmuthiary is a Bodo nationalist, and has favoured the creation of an autonomous Bodoland region. He has been backed at various times by the All Bodo Students' Union and the National Democratic Alliance.

Bwiswmuthiary is a supporter of the Indo-US nuclear deal.

== Personal life ==
Bwiswmuthiary is a Boro Kachari and was born on 1 January 1960 to father Bwrai Mahajwn Bwiswmuthiary and mother Ishari (Ashagi) Bwiswmuthiary in Goibari village of Baksa district in Assam. He did his schooling from Ouabari Lower Primary School, Hashraobari and Borobazar High School, Bijni. Bwiswmuthiary graduated with a B.A. (Hons. in Political Science) from Kokrajhar College, under Guwahati University. He also attained Prabin diploma in Hindi from Assam Rashtra Bhasha Prachar Samiti, Guwahati. He married Uttara Bwiswmuthiary on 18 February 1981, with whom he has four sons.
