= RJAM =

RJAM may refer to:

- Minami Torishima Airport (ICAO airport code)
- Rabha Jatiya Aikya Manch, political party in Assam, India
- DZRJ-AM, RJ-AM 810 kHz in Manila
