= Pramod Boro =

Indian politician

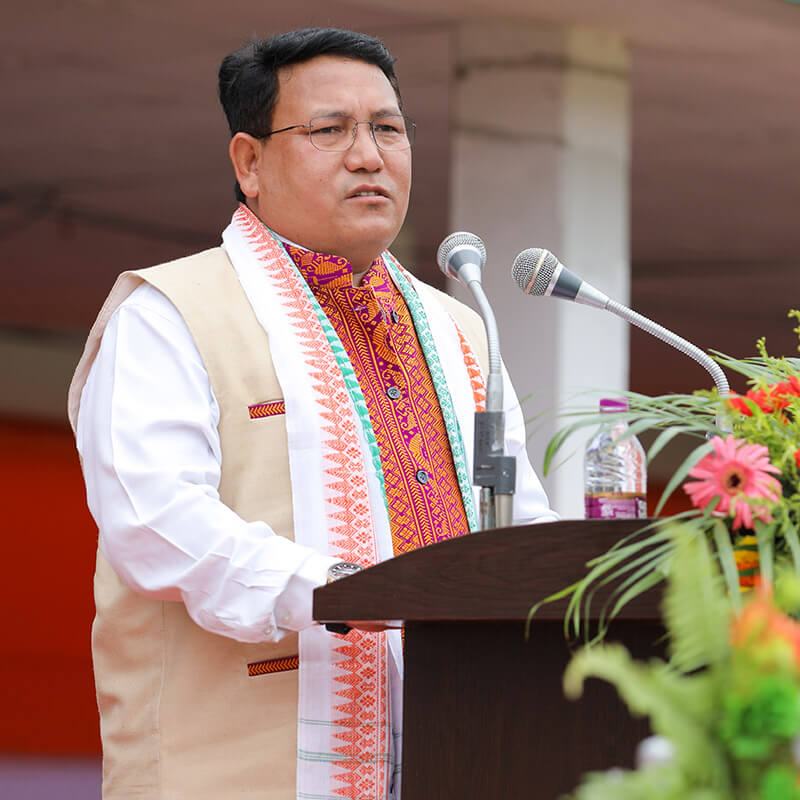

2nd Chief Executive Member of the Bodoland Territorial Council
- In office 15 December 2020 – 4 October 2025
- Preceded by: Hagrama Mohilary
- Succeeded by: Hagrama Mohilary
- Constituency: Koklabari

Member of Parliament, Rajya Sabha
- Incumbent
- Assumed office 10 April 2026
- Preceded by: Ajit Kumar Bhuyan
- Constituency: Assam

President of All Bodo Students Union
- In office 2009–2020

Personal details
- Born: 1 March 1975 (age 51) Tamulpur, Assam, India
- Party: United People's Party Liberal
- Other political affiliations: National Democratic Alliance; North-East Democratic Alliance
- Parent: Ghanashyam Boro (father)
- Website: upplofficial.com

Pramod Boro (born 1 March 1975) is an Indian politician serving as the president of the United People's Party Liberal (UPPL) since 2020, and was the 2nd Chief Executive Member (CEM) of the Bodoland Territorial Council representing Koklabari from 2020 to 2025. He is currently serving as a member of the Rajya Sabha since 2026. He was the former president of All Bodo Students' Union from 2009 to 2020.

== Political career ==
After stepping down as the president of ABSU, he formally joined the UPPL on 21 February 2020 during the Fourth Annual Convention held in Bijni, Chirang District, Assam. The UPPL had been formed on 5 August 2015 under the banner of the Bodoland Movement groups, with Urkhao Gwra Brahma serving as the founding president of the party.

Pramod Boro is currently the president of the UPPL. Under his leadership, the UPPL came to power in the 2020 BTC elections through an alliance with the Bharatiya Janata Party (BJP) and the Gana Suraksha Party (GSP). He had served as the Chief Executive Member (CEM) of the Bodoland Territorial Council (BTC) from 15 December 2020 till 2025. He was elected to the Rajya Sabha in 2026.

== Early life and education ==
Pramod Boro was born to Ghanashyam Boro on 1 March 1975 at Sauraguri village under Tamulpur police station in Nalbari district (now in Baksa district ).

He comes from an economically weak agrarian family and faced significant economic challenges during his schooling days. He attended his village school during the lower primary stage and later went to Tamulpur HS School for his upper primary and matriculation education.

After completing his higher secondary, Pramod Boro shifted to Guwahati for higher education. But due to his family’s financial constraints, he left his under-graduate studies midway. During this time, he worked as a daily wage labourer and a rickshaw puller. He also ventured into coal mining in Meghalaya with his friends to support his family.

Pramod Boro did not complete his BSc degree. His highest educational qualification is HS(12th) as per Election Commission.

== Early political career ==
=== Bodoland Movement and Pramod Boro ===
Since the time of his school days, he was active with the Bodo Student's Union and their activities in various social-political movements in Assam. During that time of his school days, there was the beginning of the 'Great Mass Movement' for the separation of Bodoland as a state, under the leadership of then-president of ABSU, Upendranath Brahma since 1987. As an active student leader in the field of social movements, he had actively joined the movement along with the fellow students.

His involvement with the mass movement did not end there, in the latter days when he joined college, he was elected as the president of ABSU, Kamrup District Committee in the year 1997. He was given greater responsibility as a Central Committee member of All Bodo Students Union. He actively worked as the assistant general secretary and as the vice-president of the union before he was elevated to the position of president in the All Bodo Students Union (ABSU). Before he became the president, he had actively worked with the union at the forefront carrying out massive educational awareness amongst the mass of Bodo people in the entire Assam. During the presidency of Rwn Gwra Narzary at the central, they started a program called ‘Year of Education’ in 2006, later it continued as the ‘Mission Quality Education’ from 2007. Extensively with an action plan to improve the standard, accessibility, and quality education among the Bodo students in the state.

=== Pramod Boro as ABSU president ===
He was elected as the president of the All Bodo Students Union in 2009, at the annual conference held at Thelamara in Sonitpur district of Assam. Ever since he became the president of the union, he tirelessly dedicated himself to serve the society with a voluntary zeal. His prime importance towards his responsibility was to bring permanent peace to the Bodoland region and to bring change in the society where every human being can live with full freedom and have the right to education and development.

His focus was to establish peace in the region ever since he got the momentum with the observance of 'Arms and Violence Free Society's foundation day observed by ABSU on 15 February 2009. Connecting all the major events observed by the Union as 'Anti Terrorism Day' on 30 July (Since 1996). However, the Bodos being stricken by many education-socio-economic and political issues the Bodo community was not free from various movements in the state.

In December 2010, when the Congress-led UPA II government announced to create a separate state as Telangana, under the presidency of Pramod Boro the ABSU raised its voice, "If Telangana why not Bodoland". Under the leadership of Pramod Boro as the President, from 2010 onwards the agitation to revive the Bodoland Statehood was decided, and started again as the third phase from 2 March 2010, with a huge mass gathering at Kajalgaon Rural Stadium.

He spearheaded this third phase of the Bodoland Movement, where he got a huge response from the Mass. He proposed the Bodoland region boundary from Sonkosh in the West to Sadiya in the East.

== Biography ==
He has become the fifth Chief Executive Member (CEM) of BTC. He became the longest-serving President of ABSU from 2009 to 2020 (Feb). Under his leadership, in the long Bodoland Movement, there were many upheavals in Bodo politics, ABSU faced many criticisms and threats. Despite such situations, Pramod Boro has boldly continued the effort to bring permanent peace to the region.

== Positions held ==
- 2020–2025: Elected as the Chief Executive Member (CEM) of the Bodoland Territorial Council (BTC).
- 2020–present: Elected as the president of The United People's Party Liberal (UPPL).
- 2009-2020: Elected as the president of All Bodo Students’ Union (ABSU).
- 2026–present: Elected as member of Rajya Sabha from Assam
