= Prem Singh Brahma =

Prem Singh Brahma (Bodo: प्रेम सिंह ब्रह्म; 1952 – 2007) was the former leader of Bodo Liberation Tigers Force, the armed militant group that operated in the Bodo-dominated regions of Assam, India. He was the deputy chief of the group from 1994 to 1996. He later renounced violence and joined the Congress party.
