= Bodo People's Progressive Front =

Indian political party

Bodo People's Progressive Front (BPPF) is a political party in Assam, India, formed on 12 April 2005 for participation in the Bodoland Territorial Areas District elections.

== Split ==
The party suffered a vertical split into BPPF(R) with Rabiram Narzary and BPPF(H) with Hagrama Mohilary, the then supremo of the dissolved Bodo Liberation Tigers Force as the Party President respectively.

=== BPPF(H) ===
The Hagrama faction aligned with the Indian National Congress in the April 2006 elections for the Assam Assembly and won 11 seats. It became the junior partner in the Assam government. This was a historical occasion since the Bodo's, long associated with the Bodoland statehood movement, are now sharing power in Dispur, the capital of Assam.

=== BPPF(R) ===
The Rabiram faction, aligned with the Asom Gana Parishad in the April 2006 elections, did not win any seats in the Assam Assembly.

== See also ==
- Bodoland People's Front
