= All Bodo Students' Union =

Students' organisation in Assam, India

- दुलाराय बर' फरायसा आफाद
- Abbreviation: ABSU
- Formation: February 15, 1967; 59 years ago
- Type: Nationalist Student organization
- Purpose: Ethno-nationalist advocacy, educational reforms, cultural preservation
- Headquarters: Bodofa House, Bagansali, Kokrajhar
- Location: Bodoland Territorial Region, Assam, India
- Region served: Northeast India
- Members: Bodo students and youth
- President: Kwrwmdao Wary
- General Secretary: Khanindra Basumatary
- Website: absu.in

The All Bodo Students Union (ABSU) or Dularay Boro Foraisa Afaad (Boro Pronunciation: du.la.ɾaj bɔ.ɾo pʰɔ.ɾaj.sa a.pʰad) is a prominent student organization and ethno-nationalist movement based in Assam, India. Founded in 1967, the organization primarily represents the Bodo community, the largest ethnolinguistic minority and scheduled tribe in Assam.

ABSU has historically transitioned from a student welfare collective into a principal political pressure group. It spearheaded the Bodoland Movement, which sought territorial self-determination, socio-economic restructuring, and linguistic safeguards for the Bodo population, resulting in multiple tripartite peace accords with the Government of India and the Government of Assam.

== History and Inception ==
=== Origins (1967) ===
The All Bodo Students Union was formally established on 15 February 1967 during a convention held at the Tribal Rest House in Kokrajhar, Assam. The organization was founded to provide a unified platform for Bodo students across various regions and to preserve the socio-economic identity, traditional culture, and language of the Bodo nationality.

=== Constitutional Evolution and Political Shift ===
The association adopted its first formal constitution on 2 March 1969. Initially focused on educational reforms and socio-cultural preservation, ABSU underwent a structural and ideological shift during its 16th Annual Conference held at Dhamdhama in 1983. Under the presidency of Dipak Kumar Basumatary, the union introduced its Third Amendment, incorporating political self-preservation clauses and formally designating itself as a nationalist student organization rather than a strictly apolitical welfare entity.

== Organizational Structure ==
The internal governance of ABSU relies on a highly structured hierarchy designed to facilitate grassroots mobilization and centralized decision-making. Following the Fourth Constitutional Amendment in 1984, the organization operates across a distinct four-tier layout:

Tier Level	Committee	Jurisdiction and Operational Scope
Tier 1 (Apex)	Central Committee	Headquartered at Bodofa House in Kokrajhar. Dictates structural policies, leads high-level governmental negotiations, and oversees regional chapters (e.g., the West Bengal State Committee).
Tier 2	District Committee	Governs designated socio-political and geographical districts. The organization limits representation to a maximum of three District Committees per structural district.
Tier 3	Primary / Anchalik Committee	Operates at the block or regional level, translating directives from the District Committee to localized clusters.
Tier 4 (Grassroots)	Unit Committee	The foundational block established within individual villages, colleges, and educational institutions to manage direct student enrollment.

== Key People and Office Holders ==
=== Founders and Early Pioneers ===
- Baneswar Basumatary: Served as the founding President of ABSU (1967–1972). He laid down the foundational framework of the union to unite fragmented regional Bodo student blocks.
- Kanakeswar Narzary: The co-founder and inaugural General Secretary of ABSU (1967–1972). Often cited for his early mobilization of tribal welfare wings, he later served as the Chief of the Bodoland Autonomous Council (BAC) in 1996.

=== Movement Leaders ===
- Upendra Nath Brahma (Bodofa): Widely regarded as the most influential figure in the organization's history, Brahma served as President from 1986 until his death in 1990. He spearheaded the democratic agitation for a separate state with the slogan "Divide Assam 50-50" and elevated the student union into a major socio-political mass movement.
- Sansuma Khunggur Bwiswmuthiary: Served as the General Secretary (1983–1986) and later as President (1990–1993). He was an instrumental negotiator for the First Bodo Accord and later served as a long-standing Member of Parliament (MP) in the Lok Sabha.

=== Modern Era Leaders and Incumbents ===
- Pramod Boro: Served as the long-term President of the union from 2009 to 2020. He was a central civil signatory to the historic 2020 BTR Peace Accord. Following his student leadership, he transitioned to mainstream politics, serving as the Chief Executive Member (CEM) of the Bodoland Territorial Council and was subsequently elected to the Rajya Sabha in 2026.
- Dipen Boro: Served as President from 2020 to 2026, anchoring the crucial post-accord transition period, focusing heavily on the institutional stabilization of the region and continuous socio-educational reforms.
- Kwrwmdao Wary: The current President of the Central Committee, initially stepping into central operational tasks during structural transitions and later formalized as executive head. Alongside General Secretary Khanindra Basumatary, his leadership oversees contemporary mandates including academic standardization and policy implementations under the Sixth Schedule.

== Chronology of Central Leadership ==
The organization is governed by an elected executive body composed of a President and a General Secretary. The verified leadership chronology is as follows:

Tenure	President	General Secretary	Functional Focus & Context
1967–1972	Baneswar Basumatary	Kanakeswar Narzary	Foundation and formulation of the initial union constitution.
1972–1974	Damrudhar Brahma	Rajendra Nath Brahma	Early structural configuration and regional branch enrollment.
1974–1976	Abhiram Boro	Gobinda Basumatary	Standardization of tribal representation mandates.
1976–1979	Gobinda Basumatary	Premsing Brahma	Early focus on Bodo-medium educational rights and resource lobbying.
1979–1981	Santola Basumatary	Parmeswar Brahma	Advocacy against land encroachment in protected tribal belts.
1981–1983	Dipak Kr. Basumatary	Rajen Khakhlary	Preparations for formal political integration strategies.
1983–1986	Karendra Basumatary	Sansuma Khunggur Bwiswmuthiary	Third Constitutional Amendment; shift to ethno-nationalist student platform.
1986–1990	Upendra Nath Brahma	Rabiram Brahma	Launch of the mass Bodoland movement under the "Divide Assam 50-50" mandate.
1990–1993	Sansuma Khunggur Bwiswmuthiary	Rabiram Brahma	Escalation of democratic agitations leading up to the 1993 Bodoland Accord.
1993–1995	Garla Bata Basumatary	Moheswar Basumatary	Rejection of the flawed Bodoland Autonomous Council (BAC) layout.
1995–1996	Swmbla Basumatary	Imanual Mwchahary	Resurgence of civil rights agitations amidst local unrest.
1996–2001	Swmbla Basumatary	Urkhao Gwra Brahma / Naturam Boro	Conceptual groundwork for secondary tripartite autonomy discussions.
2001–2003	Rabiram Narzary	Lwmsrao Daimary	Mass mobilization contributing directly to the 2003 BTC Accord.
2003–2005	Rabiram Narzary	Rwngwra Narzary	Supervision of initial Sixth Schedule territory demarcations.
2005–2009	Rwngwra Narzary	Gautom Mushahary	Early models of inter-community peace and educational infrastructure stability.
2009–2020	Pramod Boro	Jiron Basumatary / Lawrence Islary	Longest single executive tenure; primary civil architect of the 2020 BTR Accord.
2020–2026	Dipen Boro	Khanindra Basumatary	Post-peace accord administrative transitions and digital educational reforms.
2026–Present	Kwrwmdao Wary	Khanindra Basumatary	Incumbent leadership managing current Sixth Schedule protective calculations.

== Accords and Administrative Influence ==
ABSU has been a primary civil society signatory to three historic peace settlements aimed at resolving the geopolitical unrest in lower Assam:

- First Bodo Accord (1993): Signed by ABSU and the government, creating the Bodoland Autonomous Council (BAC). The assembly was later rejected by ABSU due to disputes regarding boundary delimitations and lack of executive powers.
- Second Bodo Accord (2003): Led to the creation of the Bodoland Territorial Council (BTC) under the Sixth Schedule of the Indian Constitution, granting greater financial and legislative autonomy over 4 contiguous districts.
- Third Bodo Accord (2020): Signed by ABSU leadership, the Government of India, and the Government of Assam, restructuring the region into the Bodoland Territorial Region (BTR). This agreement granted expanded legislative powers, protected land rights, and integrated former armed separatist factions into mainstream civil society.

== Contemporary Mandate ==
In the post-accord era, ABSU's primary focus has adjusted from territorial agitation toward institutional and human capital preservation. Its current initiatives include:

- Educational Standardization: Supervising infrastructure, resource distribution, and curriculum development in rural Bodo-medium schools.
- Linguistic Protection: Campaigning for the implementation and institutional adoption of the Bodo language, which is recognized under the Eighth Schedule of the Indian Constitution.
- Socio-Economic Campaigns: Directing community awareness initiatives focused on eliminating substance abuse, preventing human trafficking, and stabilizing communal relations between tribal and non-tribal demographics within the BTR.

== See also ==
- Bodoland Territorial Region
- Bodo Sahitya Sabha
- Upendra Nath Brahma
- Bodo People
- Boro Language
- Bodoland Territorial Council
- Bodo Kachari Welfare Autonomous Council
