= Tiwa Jatiya Aikya Manch =

Tiwa Jatiya Aikya Manch (TJAM) is a regional political party in Assam, India. The political outfit to promote Tiwa tribal people promises uniform development of both tribal and non-tribal communities living in the Tiwa Council areas.

The party has different wings including the All Tiwa Students' Union, All Tiwa Women Association, Tiwa Yuba Chatra Parishad, Tiwa Cultural Society, and Tiwa Protection Committee. In December 2019, the party held a convention in Morigaon and decided to support the protests against the Citizenship (Amendment) Act. It also decided to demand inclusion of Tiwa Autonomous Council in the Sixth Schedule list in support of all indigenous people living in the Brahmaputra valley.
