= Asom Jatiya Sanmilan =

Asom Jatiya Sanmilan (Assam National Conference), a political party in the Indian state of Assam. AJS was founded by Asom Gana Parishad dissident Bhrigu Phukan in 1998.

In March 2001 the AJS General Secretary Hemanta Barman and many other members joined the Indian National Congress.

In the state legislative assembly elections 2001 AJS contested as a part of the Rashtriya Democratic Alliance, on a Nationalist Congress Party symbol.
