= Protected tribal belts and blocks in Assam =

The Protected Tribal Belts and Blocks in Assam, India are certain regions which was regulated under Chapter 10 of the Assam Land and Revenue Regulation Law, 1886 by the British Government as Belts and Blocks which was later on implemented by the Assam Government in 1947 by Gopinath Bardoloi, the first Chief Minister of Assam and subsequently by later Governments in power to protect the land rights of the aboriginal backward protected tribal classes (mentioned below) from immigrants in regions in which they were predominant at the time of creation (comprising 50% or more of the population) as they were primitive and largely backward. According to it in these certain regions demarcated as Protected Tribal Belts and Blocks land of the following Protected Tribal Classes were to be protected:

- Scheduled Tribe (Plains)
- Scheduled Castes
- Scheduled Tribe (Hills)
- Santhals
- Tea-Garden and Ex-Tea Garden Tribes
- Nepali Graziers and Cultivators(Gorkhas)
- Koch Rajbongshi of undivided Goalpara district

The Nepali Cultivators-Graziers were initially included in the list but were removed later on in 1969, so all the Nepali Cultivators-Graziers living in the Protected Tribal Belts and Blocks in Assam till 1969 were to be treated as other non-tribal non-protected class of people. But in 1996, the Assam Government reincluded the Gorkhas or Nepali Graziers and Cultivators as Protected Tribal Class in BTAD areas vide Government Notification No RSD.17/85/PT 1/12 dated 15 March 1996.

According to the Law, in these Protected Tribal Belts and Blocks in Assam no land of the above-mentioned protected tribal classes can be bought by a non-tribal non-protected class of people. Only the above-mentioned protected tribal classes living inside the Protected Tribal Belts and Blocks or outside in other regions of Assam could buy land from the above-mentioned protected tribal classes. Additionally, the land rights of non-tribal, non-protected individuals who were living in the protected tribal belts and blocks before their establishment will be safeguarded. However, these individuals will only be allowed to purchase land from other non-tribal, non-protected individuals residing in the belt or block before its creation, and not from the protected tribal classes mentioned earlier.
