= Bodoland Territorial Council =

Territorial council in Assam state, India

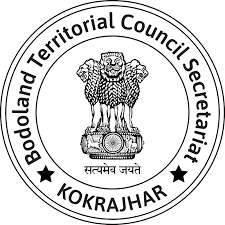

Type
- Type: Autonomous Council of the Bodoland Territorial Region
- Term limits: 5 years

Leadership
- CEM: Hagrama Mohilary, BPF
- Deputy CEM: Rihon Daimary, BPF
- Leader of Opposition: Kampa Borgoyary, UPPL

Structure
- Seats: 46 (40 elected + 6 Nominated)
- Political groups: Government (33): BPF (28); BJP (5); Opposition (7): UPPL (7); Nominated (6): NOM (6)

Elections
- Voting system: First past the post
- Last election: 22 September 2025
- Next election: 2030

Meeting place
- Bodoland Secretariat, Bodofa Nwgwr, Kokrajhar

Website
- www.bodoland.gov.in

The Bodoland Territorial Council (BTC) is an autonomous council for the Bodoland Territorial Region established under the 6th Schedule of the Constitution of India according to the Memorandum of Settlement between Bodoland Liberation Tiger Force (BLTF) and Government of India and Government of Assam.

The BTC has 40 elected members and an additional six members that are appointed by the Governor of Assam. The area under the BTC jurisdiction is officially called the Bodoland Territorial Area District (BTAD). The region falls within the geographical map of the least developed region in India. The agro-based economy is the only source of livelihood of the people. Industrialisation and other employment opportunities are scant.

The Bodoland Territorial Council is headed by a Speaker and the executive committee is chaired by a Chief Executive Member, currently Hagrama Mohilary.

The BTC consists of five contiguous districts — Kokrajhar, Baksa, Udalguri, Chirang, Tamulpur — carved out of seven existing districts — Kokrajhar, Bongaigaon, Barpeta, Nalbari, Kamrup, Darrang and Sonitpur — an area of 8970 km^{2} (11% of Assam land area i.e. 78,438 km^{2}) comprising various protected tribal belts and blocks in Assam. Its establishment was under the Amended Sixth Schedule of the Constitution of India.

== History ==
The BTC was constituted in 2003 and the first elections were held in 2005.

== Powers and competencies ==
=== Executive and legislative powers ===
The executive and legislative powers of the Bodoland Territorial Council are derived from the provisions of the Sixth Schedule of the Constitution of India and the 2003 and 2020 Bodoland Peace Agreements.

The powers and competencies of the council are as follows:

- Cottage Industry
- Animal Husbandry and Veterinary
- Forestry & Wild life
- Climate Change
- Agriculture
- Public Works
- Silk Industry
- Soil Conservation
- Co-operatives
- Fisheries
- Handlooms and Textiles
- Health and Family Welfare
- Public Health Engineering
- Irrigation
- Social Welfare & Nutrition
- Flood control schemes
- Sports and Youth Welfare
- Weights and Measures
- Library Services
- Museums and Archaeology
- Urban Development and Town and Country Planning
- Tribal Research Institute
- Education
- Land and Land Revenue
- Public Relations
- Printing and Stationery
- Tourism
- Transport
- Urban Development
- Dairy Development
- Municipal Corporations
- Village administration
- Tribal Welfare
- Welfare of SCs, OBCs, Scheduled Tribes and Minority
- Markets and Fairs
- Lotteries, Theatres, Dramatic Performance and Cinemas
- Registration of Births and Deaths
- Food Processing
- Intoxicating liquors and opium and derivatives
- Renewable Energy
- Cultural Affairs
- Industry
- Legal Metrology
- Skill Development and Entrepreneurship
- Excise
- Horticulture
- Science and Technology
- Farmers Welfare
- AYUSH
- Social Justice & Empowerment
- Welfare of Tea Tribes
- Economic and Statistics
- Traditional Skill Development
- Food and Civil Supplies
- Consumer Affairs
- Welfare of Bodoland
- Labour and Employment including Industrial Training Institutes

=== Revenue and taxation ===
The Bodoland Territorial Council to levy taxes, fees and tolls on; buildings and land, animals, vehicles, boats, entry of goods into the area, roads, ferries, bridges, sanitation, employment and income and general taxes for the maintenance of schools and roads.

== Composition ==
BPF won a majority in the elections in the December 2025 council election.

=== Party summary ===
Party	Contested	Won	+/-	% of votes
Bodoland People's Front	40	28	▲11	
United People's Party Liberal	40	7	▼5	
Bharatiya Janata Party	30	5	▼4	
Gana Suraksha Party	11	0	▼1	
Indian National Congress	40	0	▼1	
Nominated		6	Steady	
Total		46		

== Current members ==
The latest elections were held on 22 September 2025, where the BPF won a majority of 28. The UPPL and BJP won 7 and 5 seats each. Below are the newly elected members of the BTC. The BJP announced its support to the BPF.

Chief Executive Member: Hagrama Mohilary
Ward No.	Ward Name	Reservation	Name of Councillor	Party	Remarks
1	Parbatjhora	ST	Moon Moon Brahma	Bodoland People's Front	
2	Guma	None	Antaz Ali	Bodoland People's Front	
3	Srirampur	None	Wilson Hasda	United People's Party Liberal	
4	Jamduar	ST	William Narzary	Bodoland People's Front	
5	Soraibil	ST	Mritunjoy Narzary	Bodoland People's Front	
6	Kachugaon	ST	Rabiram Narzary	Bodoland People's Front	
7	Fakiragram	None	Azamul Haque	Bodoland People's Front	
8	Dotma	ST	Prakash Basumatary	Bodoland People's Front	
9	Banargaon	ST	Jubiraj Basumatary	Bodoland People's Front	
10	Debargaon	ST	Hagrama Mohilary	Bodoland People's Front	
11	Baokhungri	ST	Dhaneshwar Goyari	Bodoland People's Front	
12	Salakati	ST	Derhasat Basumatary	Bodoland People's Front	
13	Chirang	ST	Sukursing Muchahary	Bodoland People's Front	
14	Chirang Duars	ST	Khampa Borgoyari	United People's Party Liberal	
15	Kajalgaon	ST	Paniram Brahma	Bodoland People's Front	
16	Nichima	ST	James Basumatary	Bodoland People's Front	
17	Sobhaijhar	ST	Dhiraj Borgoyary	Bodoland People's Front	
18	Manas Serfang	ST	Dhananjay Basumatary	United People's Party Liberal	
19	Thuribari	None	Khalilur Rahaman	Bodoland People's Front	
20	Mathanguri	None	Begum Akhtara Ahmed	Bodoland People's Front	
21	Salbari	ST	Diganta Goyary	Bodoland People's Front	
22	Koklabari	ST	Mantu Boro	United People's Party Liberal	
23	Dihira	None	Augustush Tigga	Bodoland People's Front	
24	Mushalpur	ST	Rakesh Brahma	United People's Party Liberal	
25	Baganpara	ST	Rekharani Das Boro	Bharatiya Janata Party	
26	Darrangajuli	ST	Bijit Gwra Narzary	Bharatiya Janata Party	
27	Nagrijuli	None	Bhajan Das	Bharatiya Janata Party	
28	Goibari	ST	Pramod Boro	United People's Party Liberal	
29	Suklai Serfang	ST	Ganesh Kachary	Bodoland People's Front	
30	Goreswar	ST	Maheshwar Basumatary	Bodoland People's Front	
31	Khwirwbari	ST	Lwmsrao Daimary	Bodoland People's Front	
32	Bhergaon	ST	Daobaisa Boro	United People's Party Liberal	
33	Nonwi Serfang	None	Paul Toppo	Bodoland People's Front	
34	Khaling Duar	ST	Arjun Daimary	Bharatiya Janata Party	
35	Mwdwibari	None	Diganta Baruah	Bharatiya Janata Party	
36	Horisinga	ST	Tridip Daimari	Bodoland People's Front	
37	Dwhwnsri	ST	Fresh Mushahary	Bodoland People's Front	
38	Bhairabkunda	ST	Rihon Daimary	Bodoland People's Front	
39	Pasnwi Serfang	ST	Shyam Sundi	Bodoland People's Front	
40	Rowta	ST	Charan Boro	Bodoland People's Front	

== Executive Committee ==
S.No	Name	Constituency	Department	Party
1.	Hagrama Mohilary; Chief	Debargaon	Public Works; Panchayat & Rural Development; Finance; Sports & Youth Welfare; Cultural Affairs; any other departments not allotted to any other EMS	BPF
2.	Rihon Daimary; Deputy Chief	Bhairabkunda	Agriculture	BPF
3.	Mritunjoy Narzary	Soraibil	Transport	BPF
4.	Moon Moon Brahma	Parbatjhora	Urban	BPF
5.	Rabiram Narzary	Kachugaon	Education	BPF
6.	Derhasat Basumatary	Salakati	Health & Family Welfare	BPF
7.	Prakash Basumatary	Dotma	Social Welfare	BPF
8.	Paniram Brahma	Kajalgaon	Forest & Wild Life	BPF
9.	Dhiraj Borgoyary	Sobhaijhar	Excise; Soil Conservation	BPF
10.	Begum Akhtara Ahmed	Mathanguri	PHE	BPF
11.	Augustus Tigga	Dihira	Animal Husbandry & Veterinary	BPF
12.	Ganesh Kachary	Suklai Serfang	Irrigation	BPF
13.	Lwmsrao Daimary	Khwirwbari	Land Revenue & Disaster Management	BPF
14.	Fresh Mushahary	Dwhwnsri	Water Resource	BPF

== See also ==
- 2020 Bodoland Territorial Council election
- 2025 Bodoland Territorial Council election
- Bodo Kachari Welfare Autonomous Council
- Autonomous regions of India
- Bodoland
