= Rabha Jatiya Aikya Manch =

Regional political party in Assam, India

Rabha Jatiya Aikya Manch (RJAM) is a regional political party in Assam, India.
