= Heera Saraniya =

Member of Parliament from Assam

Naba Kumar Saraniya
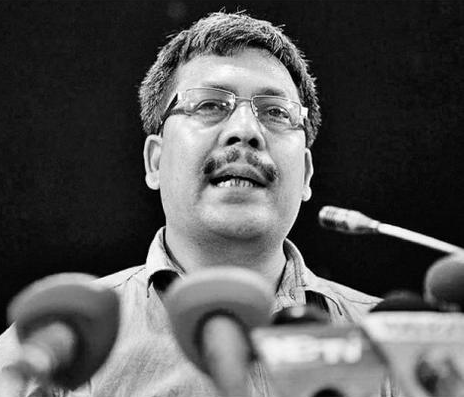
- Saraniya in 2019

Member of Parliament, Lok Sabha
- In office 16 May 2014 – 4 June 2024
- Preceded by: Sansuma Khunggur Bwiswmuthiary
- Succeeded by: Joyanta Basumatary
- Constituency: Kokrajhar

Founder and President of Gana Suraksha Party
- Incumbent
- Assumed office 5 August 2019
- Succeeded by: Position established

Personal details
- Born: 1 May 1969 (age 57) Dighalipaar, Baksa, Assam
- Party: Independent; Gana Suraksha Party
- Spouse: Smti Barnali Baishya
- Children: Sristisikha Saraniya
- Occupation: Politician

Naba Kumar Saraniya alias Heera Saraniya, also spelled as Heera Sarania and Hira Sarania, alias Naba Deka (born 1 May 1969) is an Indian politician who served as a Member of parliament, Lok Sabha representing the Kokrajhar constituency in Assam from 2014 to 2019 as an independent candidate and has served since 2019 as a member of Gana Suraksha Party. He won by the highest margin ever recorded in polls in Assam and as an independent candidate in the history of Lok Sabha elections. He is also the founder and president of Gana Suraksha Party since 2019. Earlier, Saraniya was the commander of the 709 battalion of United Liberation Front of Asom (ULFA). He was said to be one of the most dreaded militants in Assam.

== Family background ==
Saraniya’s father is dead and he is the eldest among four brothers and two sisters. Both sisters are in their twenties. The saraniyas own 15 bighas of land and are fairly well-off. They live in a typical Assamese house.

== Militancy life in ULFA ==
Despite being the son of retired Indian army personnel, Naba joined the militant outfit ULFA in mid-1980s. In his militant life he was known as Heera Sarania. Heera was trained in Myanmar and Afghanistan. Sarania was the commander of ULFA's 709 Battalion.

== The Diary ==
On 17 November 2005, 10 army personnel from the Dumuni cob (Company Operating Base) were able to recover Saraniya’s diary along with some arms, ammunitions, cash and cash-demand letter at Jala Gaon in the newly formed Baska district. The diary reveals Bhutan’s one-time collusion with the outfit and the ULFA’s deep-seated ire against India. Journalist Teresa Rehman claimed that she got the diary of Heera Sarania.

== Arrest ==
On 20 August 2013, Guwahati city police arrested Heera Saraniya along with 3 other persons in charge of robbery, kidnap and murder. Similarly a case has been registered against him on 9 October 2020 at Kokrajhar police station.

== See also ==
- Tapan Baruah
- Bijoy Chinese
- List of top leaders of ULFA
- Sanjukta Mukti Fouj
