= Chief Executive Member of the Bodoland Territorial Council =

Head of an autonomous district council in Assam, India

Chief of the Bodoland Territorial Region
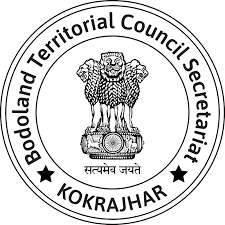

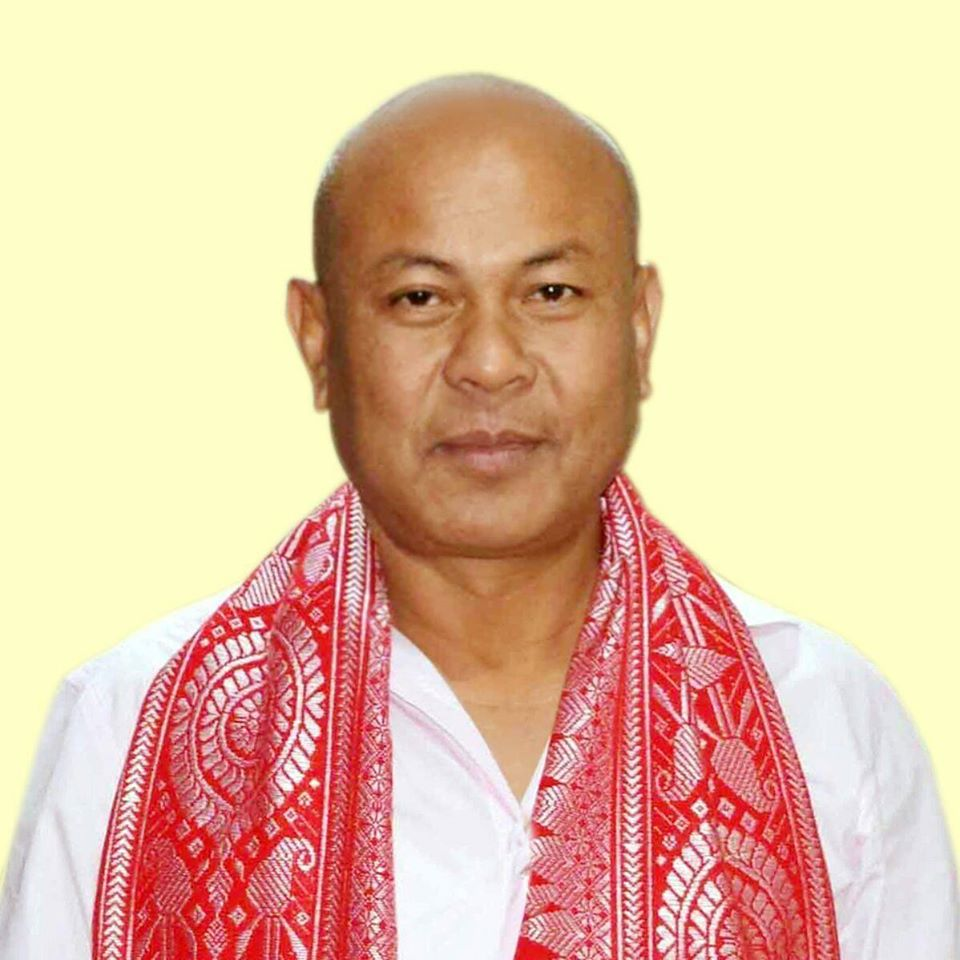
- Incumbent; Hagrama Mohilary since 5 October 2025
- Inaugural holder: Hagrama Mohilary
- Formation: 8 April 2003

This is a list of Chief Executive Member of the Bodoland Territorial Council, the leader of the Bodoland Territorial Council, the autonomous district council for the Bodoland Territorial Region in Assam, India.

The chief executive chairs meetings of the Executive Committee of the Bodoland Territorial Council.

The Bodoland Territorial Council was established in 2003 and Hagrama Mohilary was the first Chief Executive Member, serving until 27 April 2020.

The council was under Governor's rule between 27 April 2020 and 15 December 2020 following the postponement of elections scheduled for 4 April 2020 as a result of the global coronavirus pandemic.

== List of chief executives ==
S. No.	Portrait	Name	Term start	Term end
1		Hagrama Mohilary	8 April 2003	27 April 2020
-		Governor's rule	27 April 2020	15 December 2020
2		Pramod Boro	15 December 2020	4 October 2025
3		Hagrama Mohilary	5 October 2025	Incumbent

== Deputy Chief Executive Member ==
The Chief Executive Member leads an executive committee made up of several Executive Members one of whom may be designated as Deputy Chief Executive Member.

=== List of deputy chief executives ===
Portrait	Name	Term start	Term end
	Kampa Borgoyary	????	27 April 2020
	Office not in use	27 April 2020	15 December 2020
	Gobinda Basumatary	15 December 2020	4 October 2025
	Rihon Daimary	5 October 2025	Incumbent

== See also ==
- Bodoland
- Bodoland Territorial Council
