= United People's Party Liberal =

Political party in India

- Abbreviation: UPPL
- Leader: Urkhao Gwra Brahma
- President: Pramod Boro
- Rajya Sabha Leader: Rwngwra Narzary
- Lok Sabha Leader: Joyanta Basumatary
- Founded: 5 August 2015 (11 years ago)
- Headquarters: Kokrajhar, BTR, Assam
- Youth wing: UPPL Youth Wing
- Women's wing: UPPL Women's Wing
- Ideology: Regionalism
- Colours: Yellow, Green and White
- ECI status: State Party
- Alliance: NDA (2020–2026); NEDA (2020–2026)
- Seats in Rajya Sabha: 2 / 245
- Seats in Lok Sabha: 1 / 543
- Seats in Assam Legislative Assembly: 0 / 126
- Seats in Bodoland Territorial Council: 7 / 40

Election symbol
- Tractor

Website
- Official website

The United People's Party Liberal (abbr. UPPL) is a regional party of Assam. The party has its headquarters in Kokrajhar town. The party has significant support in Bodoland Territorial Region.

== History ==
The UPPL was formed on 5 August 2015 and the earlier name was Peoples Co-ordination for Democratic Right (PCDR). The party was formed with the ideology of working for the welfare of the people irrespective of caste, creed and religion.

Bharatiya Janata Party announced that it has agreed to support efforts by the UPPL to form an executive body in Bodoland Territorial Council. The leader of the UPPL, Pramod Boro became the new Chief Executive Member of the Bodoland Territorial Council on 15 December 2020.

== Symbol ==
United People's Party Liberal has been granted "Tractor Chalata Kisan" as its reserved symbol in the state of Assam by the Election Commission of India.

== Electoral performance ==
=== Lok Sabha (General) election results ===
Election	Lok sabha	Party leader	Pre-poll alliance	Seats contested	Seats won	+/- in seats	Overall vote %	Vote swing	Ref.
2019	17th	Pramod Boro	None		0 / 543	Steady		▲	
2024	18th	Pramod Boro	NDA	1	1 / 543	▲1	488,995	▲	

=== State Legislative Assembly Elections ===
Assam Legislative Assembly Elections
Election Year	Leader	seats contested	seats won	+/- in seats	Overall votes	% of overall votes	+/- in vote share	Sitting side
2016	Pramod Boro	4	0	Steady			▲	
2021	Pramod Boro	8	6	▲6	651,744	3.40%	▲3.40%	Government
2026	Pramod Boro	18	0	▼6	496,304	2.29%	▼1.14%	

== Controversy ==
=== Allegations of Corruption ===
A controversial photograph of Benjamin Basumatary, a suspended leader of the United People’s Party Liberal (UPPL), an ally of the BJP in Assam, has sparked debate ahead of the Lok Sabha polls after circulating widely on social media. Basumatary, clad only in a traditional "gamosa," is depicted lying on a bed surrounded by Rs 500 notes. UPPL chief Pramod Boro clarified that Basumatary was suspended from the party in January due to allegations of corruption and misuse of funds in government schemes.

== CEM of Bodoland Territorial Council ==
No.	Name	Portrait	Constituency	Term of office		
No.	Name	Portrait	Constituency	From	To	Days in office
1	Pramod Boro		Koklabari	15 December 2020	5 October 2025	5 years, 330 days

== State Minister ==
=== Assam ===
No.	Name	Department	Constituency	Term of office		
No.	Name	Department	Constituency	From	To	Days in office
1	Urkhao Gwra Brahma	Handloom & Textile; Soil Conservation; Sericulture; The welfare of Plain Tribe & Backward Classes (BTC).; The Welfare of Bodoland	Chapaguri	10 May 2021	12 May 2026	5 years, 2 days

== See also ==
- List of political parties in India
