= Hagrama Mohilary =

Indian politician

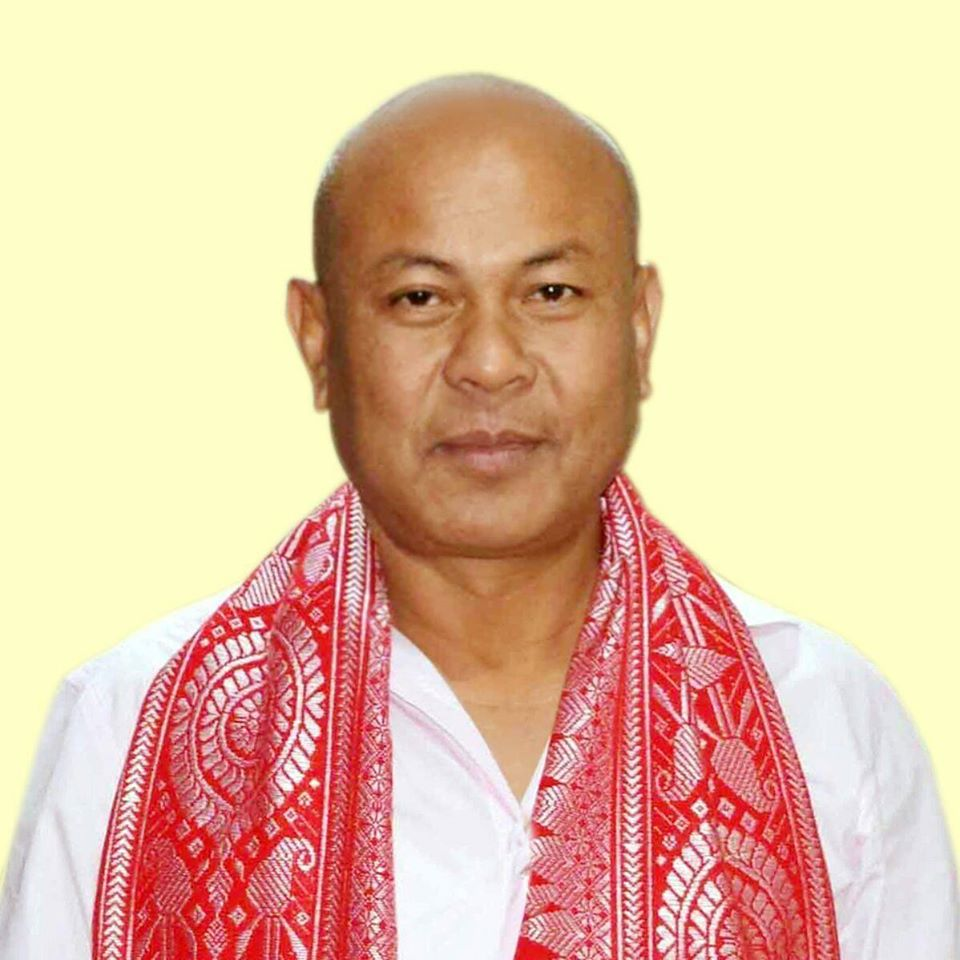

1st and 3rd Chief of the Bodoland Territorial Council
- Incumbent
- Assumed office 5 October 2025
- Governor: Lakshman Acharya
- Deputy: Rihon Daimary
- Preceded by: Pramod Boro
- In office 8 April 2003 – 27 April 2020
- Preceded by: Office established
- Succeeded by: Governor's rule
- Constituency: Deborgaon

President of the Bodoland People's Front
- Incumbent
- Assumed office 5 December 2005
- Preceded by: Party established

Chief of Bodo Liberation Tigers
- In office 2003–2003
- Preceded by: N/A
- Succeeded by: N/A

Personal details
- Born: 1 March 1969 (age 57) Kokrajhar district, Assam, India
- Party: Bodoland People's Front
- Website: hagramamohilary.com

Hagrama Mohilary (born 1 March 1969) is an Indian politician who served as the first Chief Executive Member (CEM) of the Bodoland Territorial Council (BTC) from 2003 to 2020. He has been serving as CEM again since 2025, representing the Deborgaon constituency. He is the chairperson of the Bodoland People's Front and had been the head of Bodoland Territorial Council since its inception in 2003. He won the third General Assembly Elections in 2015 and formed his Government for the third time. Mohilary was the chief of the Bodo Liberation Tigers (BLT) before joining mainstream politics in 2003.

== Early life ==
Mohilary was born on 1 March 1969 into a Boro family in the Kokrajhar district of Assam, India. He spent his childhood in the Bodoland region, which was marked by longstanding socio-political unrest and demands for ethnic autonomy. Growing up amid these tensions deeply influenced his political consciousness and attachment to Bodo identity.

== Career ==
=== History ===
Mohilary was the chief of the Bodo Liberation Tigers (BLT) before joining the mainstream politics in 2003. Mohilary formed Bodoland People's Front in year 2005 and was elected its first president. He formed an alliance with NDA, Atal Bihari Vajpayee become instrumental in onboarding Bodoland People's Front in 2003.

=== Bodoland Territorial Council ===
He played key role in establishment of Bodoland Territorial Council on 10 February 2003, thus fulfilling the Bodo aspirations. The Bodoland Territorial Council (BTC), a self-governing body, is a new name added to the provision of Sixth Schedule to the Constitution of India, in BTAD, Assam. Soon after taking over as the first Chief Executive Member of BTC, Mohilary advocated for quality education in BTC area. In 2010, the Bodoland People's Front (BPF) led by Mohilary swept the Bodoland Territorial Council (BTC) polls winning 31 of the 40 seats. He said, "I congratulate the people for the victory. Our victory has proved people's support to us. We will carry on the good work for the development of the region".

=== Assam Assembly election ===
Under his leadership Bodoland People's Front won 12 seats out of 13 contested seats in Assam Legislative Assembly held in 2016.

=== BTC Development ===
==== Agriculture Sector ====
As the Chief Executive Member of Bodoland Territorial Council, Mohilary planned various program for growth of agriculture sector, in January 2006 10 officers from four Districts of the BTC had been sent to Indian Institute of Horticulture Research (IIHR), Bangalore for the modern technologies.

==== Industrial Sector ====
BTC, setup 12 Handloom training Center and 6 handloom production centre. In the year 2008, the Bodoland Regional Apex Weavers ann Artisans Cooperative Federation Ltd. (BRAWFED) was formed by reorganising the BAHU (Bodoland Association of Handloom Unit) on Cooperative basis with registered Head Office at Kokrajhar in BTC, Assam.

==== Education ====
Bodoland University designated as 12B status university in 2019.BTC chief Hagrama Mohilary said the granting of 12B status to Bodoland University is a long-cherished dream of the people of the BTAD and the entire lower Assam coming true. Stating that Bodoland University is the only university in the BTC and the entire Lower Assam districts, Mohilary expressed his confidence that the university will pave the way for development of human resources, apart from other development and intellectual activities.

==== Development of Bodo Language ====
He was instrumental in the inclusion of Bodo language in Devanagari script in the Eighth Schedule to the Constitution of India as per Articles 344(1) and 351.
