= Tamulpur district =

- District of Assam
- Location in Assam
- Coordinates: 26.64°N 91.58°E
- Country: India
- State: Assam
- Territorial Region: Bodoland
- Formation: 23 January 2022
- Headquarters: Tamulpur

Government
  - Lok Sabha constituencies: Kokrajhar
  - Vidhan Sabha constituencies: Tamulpur Goreswar
  - Deputy Commissioner: Sri Simanta Kumar Das, ACS

Area
  - Total: 884 km^{2} (341 sq mi)

Population (2011)
  - Total: 389,150
  - Density: 440/km^{2} (1,140/sq mi)
- Time zone: UTC+5:30 (Indian Standard Time)
- Website: https://tamulpur.assam.gov.in/

Tamulpur district, is an administrative district in Bodoland Territorial Region of Assam, one of the North-Eastern states of India. The administrative headquartered at Tamulpur.

In 2021, the Cabinet of Assam, headed by Chief Minister Himanta Biswa Sarma, approved the proposal to make Tamulpur a full-fledged district. On 23 January 2022 Tamulpur was formally created.

On 30 December 2022, Assam Government has decided to remerge it with Baksa district and From, 1 January 2023 the district ceased to exist. The decision came before delimitation process in the state.

However, on August 25, 2023, the Government revealed a new decision to recreate the district, covering the Tamulpur and Goreswar Assembly seats.

== Demographics ==
At the time of the 2011 census, Tamulpur district had a population of 389,150, of which 5,631 (1.45%) live in urban areas. Tamulpur has a sex ratio of 970 females per 1000 males. Scheduled Castes and Scheduled Tribes made up 42,246 (10.86%) and 121,321 (31.17%) of the population respectively.

=== Religion ===
Religions in Tamulpur district (2011)
Religion	Percent
Hinduism	83.36%
Islam	12.97%
Christianity	3.22%
Other or not stated	0.45%

Hinduism is followed by 324,396 (83.36%) and is the majority religion. Muslims are 50,486 (12.97%) while Christians are 12,533 (3.22%).

=== Language ===
Languages of Tamulpur district (2011)
1. Assamese (37.0%)
2. Bodo (25.4%)
3. Bengali (22.3%)
4. Nepali (5.18%)
5. Santali (4.67%)
6. Sadri (0.96%)
7. Rajbongshi (0.93%)
8. Others (3.57%)

At the time of the 2011 census, 36.96% of the population spoke Assamese, 25.40% Boro, 22.33% Bengali, 5.18% Nepali and 4.67% Santali, 0.96% Sadri and 0.93% Rajbongshi as their first language.
