= Bodoland Territorial Region =

- Autonomous Administrative Region
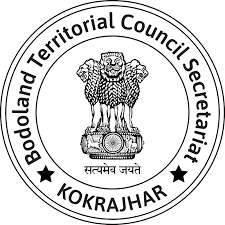
- Seal
- Motto: "Truth Alone Triumphs"; Slogan: "For Peace and Development"
- Bodoland Territorial Region Within India
- Coordinates: 26°42′N 91°05′E
- Country: India
- State: Assam
- Established: February 9, 2003; 23 years ago
- Capital: Kokrajhar
- Districts: 5

Government
  - Type: Autonomous Administrative Region
  - Body: Bodoland Territorial Council
  - Chief Executive: Hagrama Mohilary
  - Deputy Chief Executive: Rihon Daimary
  - Speaker: Tridip Daimari
  - Deputy Speaker: Bijit Gwra Narzary

Area
  - Total: 8,970 km^{2} (3,460 sq mi)

Population (2011)
  - Total: 3,155,359
  - Density: 352/km^{2} (911/sq mi)

Languages
  - Official: Bodo
- Time zone: UTC+05:30 (IST)
- Website: bodoland.gov.in

The Bodoland Territorial Region (BTR) or Bodoland, is an autonomous division in Assam, India, in Northeast India. It is made up of five districts on the north bank of the Brahmaputra River below the foothills of Bhutan and Arunachal Pradesh. It is administered by an elected body known as the Bodoland Territorial Council which came into existence under the terms of a peace agreement signed in February 2003 and its autonomy was further extended by an agreement signed in January 2020. The region covers an area of over nine thousand square kilometres and is predominantly inhabited by the Bodo people and other tribal communities of Assam.

== Etymology of Bodoland ==
The Plains Tribes Council of Assam (PTCA) had demanded, since its inception in 1967, a separate union territory for the Boro and other plain tribes, to be called Udayachal. With the failure of PTCA, the All Bodo Students' Union launched the Bodo Movement in 1987 with the demand for a separate state to be called Bodoland, ending with the Bodo Accord of 1993 with the formation of Bodoland Autonomous Council. Bodoland is named after Bodo, an alternative spelling of the Boro people who live primarily in the Dooars regions of Goalpara and Kamrup districts.

== History ==
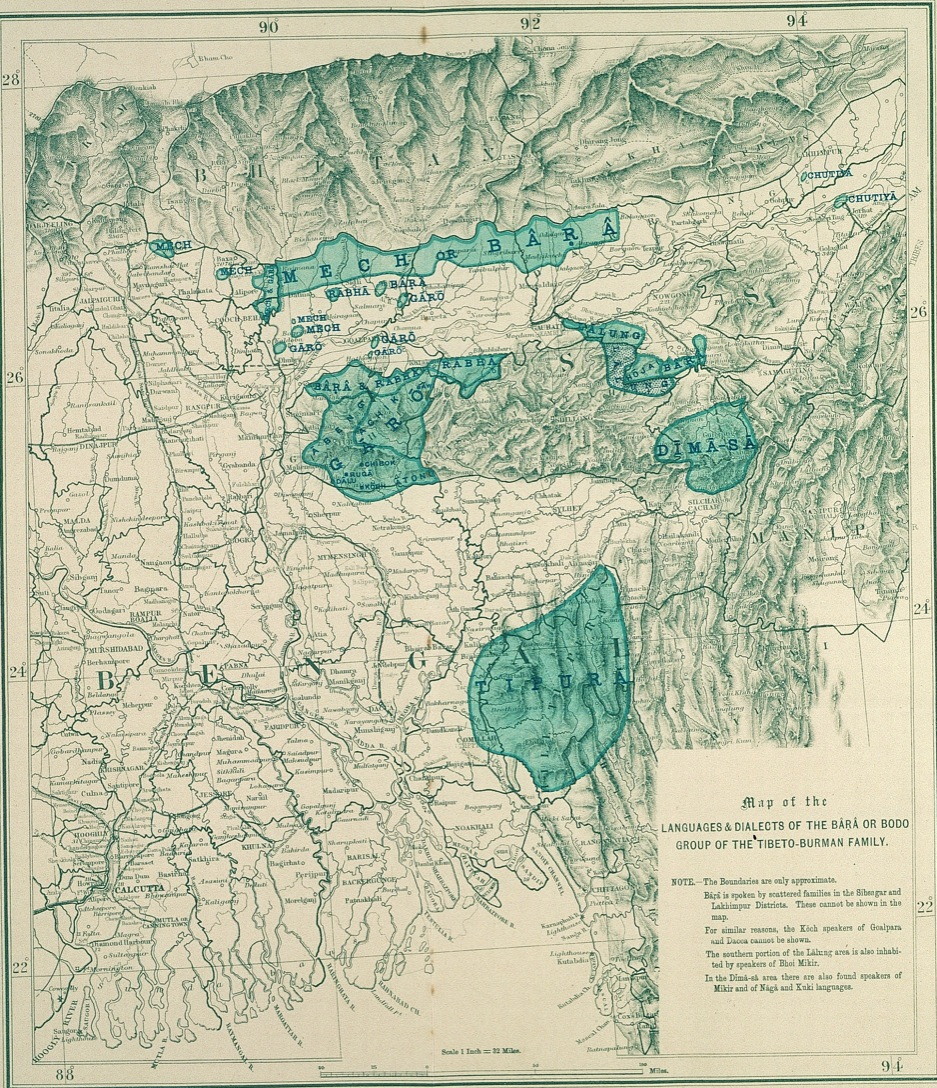
Bodoland is Mech or Bârâ region of North bank, as reported in the Language Survey of India 1903

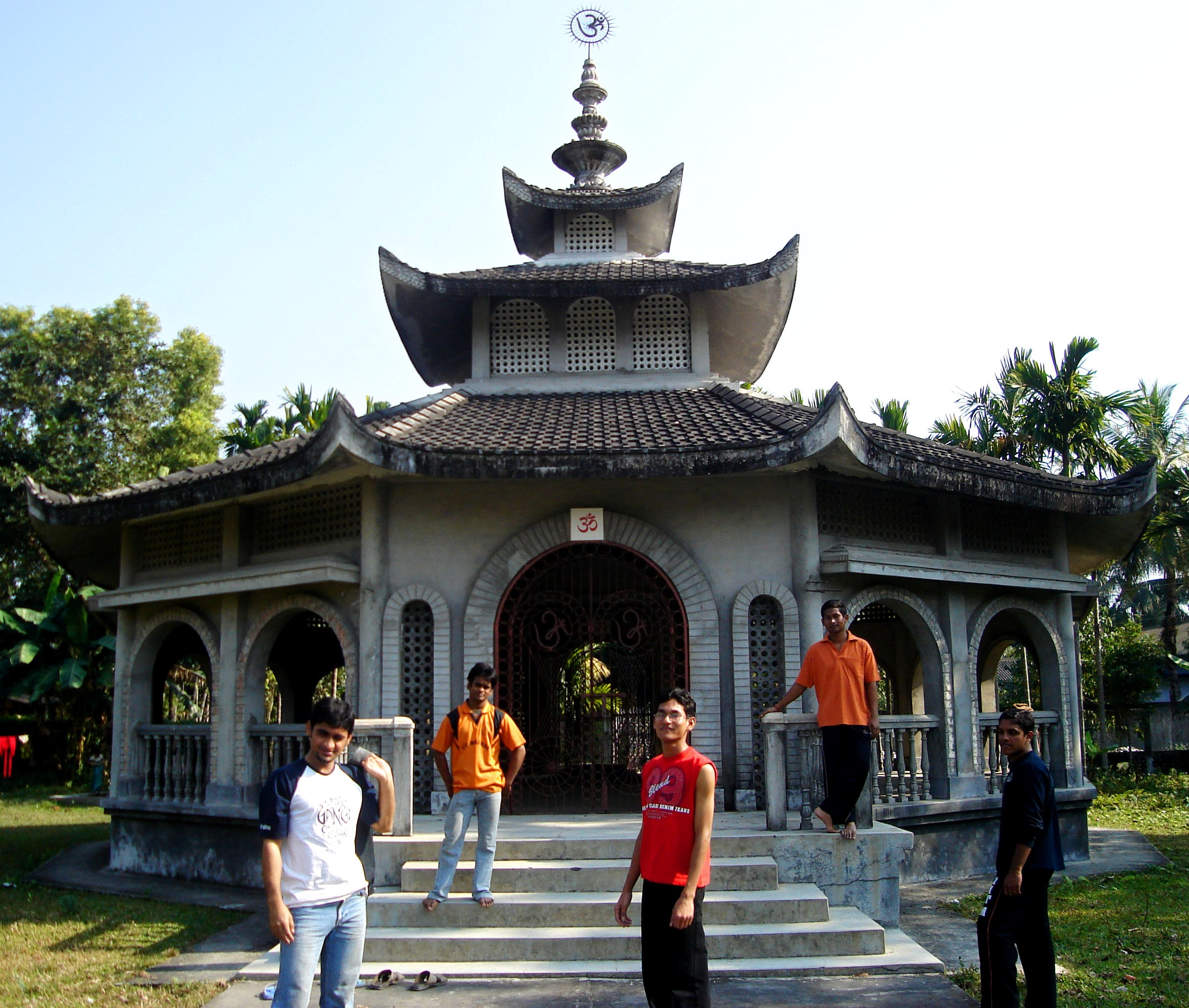
A Brahma temple at Kokrajhar

Originally a part of Bhutan, this region came under the control of Koch king Vishwa Singha in the early 16th century. Around 1562, the successor king Nara Narayan determined that the Meches and Koches peoples north of the newly constructed Gohain Kamal Ali road could follow their indigenous customs whereas peoples to its south had to follow Hindu Brahmanical rites. After the split of the Koch kingdom and subsequent collapse of the eastern Koch Hajo due to the Mughals and during the period of Ahom-Mughal conflicts in early 17th century the Bhutan kingdom pushed south and took control of the region down to the Gohain Kamal Ali. Following the Battle of Itakhuli in 1681 the Ahom kingdom consolidated their rule up to the Manas river in the west and the region north of the Gohain Kamal Ali road, divided into different Duars, fell into its possession. The Ahoms soon faced trouble from the Bhutanese, in the form of incursions, raids, and violent opposition, beginning about 1688, to tax collection by the Ahoms. Eventually these clashes came to an end with a written agreement.

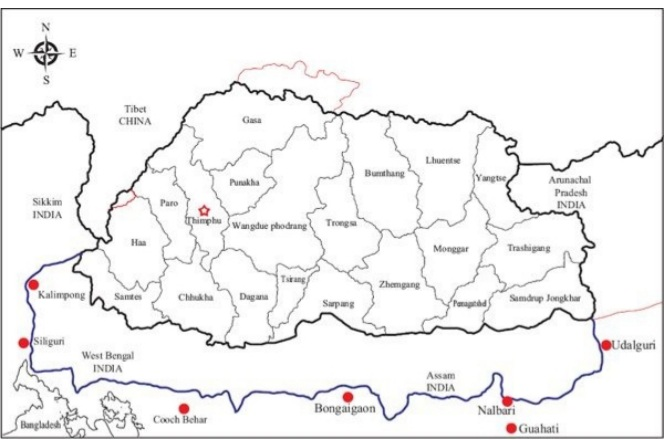
Most areas of BTR were under the Kingdom of Bhutan till the Duar War of 1865

Duars between Sankosh River and Manas River were collectively known as the Eastern Duars, those between Manas River and Barnadi River were collectively known as Kamrup Duars, and those between Barnadi River and Dhansiri River were collectively known as Darrang Duars. The Duars to the west of Goalpara were called Western Duars.

The Duars in the Goalpara region (which was outside the Ahom kingdom) were under Bhutan's control, but the administration of the Duars to east were shared between Bhutan or Tibet and the Ahom kingdom under different mechanisms. The Duars in the Kamrup region followed the posa system in which the Bhutanese were given possession of the duars in lieu of an annual payment; and those in the Darrang region were alternately controlled by the Bhutanese and the Ahoms in an annual cycle. The Bhutanese control over these regions were via local authorities, not ethnic Bhutanese, who were appointed by Bhutanese provincial governors called Ponlops

After the British took control of Ahom kingdom in 1826, they maintained the Ahom-Bhutan arrangement for a while but the payments made in kind and the shared administration were something the colonial administration was unwilling to maintain and annexed the Kamrup and Darrang Duars in 1841 and the Kariapar Duar in 1844; and following the Duar War in 1865 took complete possession of the Duars and removed Bhutanese interest from the Goalpara and Western Duars for good. The Duars associated with the historical regions of Goalpara, Kamrup, and Darrang were then added to these districts.

=== Demand for statehood ===
Along with the other parts of Northeast India, regional aspiration in the region reached a turning point in the 1980s. The isolation of the region, its complex social character, and its backwardness compared to other parts of the country have all resulted in the complicated set of demands ranging from demand for autonomy and opposition to migrants to movements for secession.

The region is also the gateway to the North Eastern Region of India, where one of the main students organisation, All Bodo Students Union (ABSU), allied with National Democratic Front of Boroland – Progressive (NDFB-P), National Democratic Front of Boroland – D.R. Nabla faction, People's Joint Action Committee for Boroland Movement (PJACBM) which is an amalgamation of over three dozen Bodo organisations and its supporters are demanding the Government of India create a separate state (within the Indian Union) comprising the seven Assam districts – Kokrajhar, Chirang, Baksa, Udalguri, Sonitpur, Lakhimpur and Dhemaji – which have a significant Bodo population. On the other hand, it is also claimed as a sovereign state (complete independence from India) by the separatist insurgent group NDFB.

==== 1993 and 2003 peace agreements ====
Following an agreement in 1993, Bodoland became an autonomous administrative unit constituted under the Sixth Schedule of the Constitution of India covering an area of 8,795 km^{2} administered by the Bodoland Autonomous Council.

Following a further peace agreement, the Bodoland Territorial Council was formed in 2003, with a mission to accomplish development in the area of economic, education, preservation of land right, linguistic aspiration, socio-culture and ethnic identity of Bodos and above all to speed up the infrastructure development of communities in the Bodoland area. The actual functioning of the council was started on 7 December 2003 by constituting the 12 members of the Council provisionally.

After the Council Election on 13 May 2005 and subsequent bye-election in November 2005, the 40-member Legislative Council has been formed to look after the development works in the Bodoland Territorial Area Districts. The remaining six members are nominated by the Governor of Assam from the unrepresented Communities. Thus there are altogether 46 members of the council, representing all communities of the BTC Area known as Member of Council Legislative Assembly (MCLA).

==== 2020 peace agreement and the formation of the Bodoland Territorial Region ====
A new peace agreement was signed on 27 January 2020 between the Government of India and the Government of Assam on one side and the National Democratic Front of Bodoland (NDFB), the All Bodo Students’ Union and United Bodo People's Organisation on the other. Under the terms of this agreement, a Bodoland Territorial Region was formed with enhanced executive and legislative powers. The Bodoland Territorial Council will have competency over almost all areas defined by the Sixth Schedule of the Constitution of India and its membership will be increased to 60. The boundary of BTR will be redrawn to make Boro speakers majority within the region. This will be done by forming new districts and the boundary of the region will be adjusted to include contiguous Bodo inhabited areas from neighbouring districts and exclude the non-Bodo inhabited territories which are currently under the jurisdiction of the BTC. On 26 January 2023, Assam Chief Minister Himanta Biswa Sarma have decided to include 60 more villages which have at least 80% Bodo population in the Bodoland Territorial Region, in order to make Bodo-speakers a slight majority.

Bodoland will also have the right to autonomously be represented at national level sports and cultural events such as the National Games of India and the Khelo India Youth Games. The agreement also makes the Bodo language with Devnagri script an associate official language of Assam.

== Government and politics ==
=== Bodoland Territorial Council ===
The region is administered by an elected body known as the Bodoland Territorial Council (BTC) which was established according to the Memorandum of Settlement of 10 February 2003. BTC came into existence immediately after the surrender of Bodo Liberation Tigers Force (BLTF). The BLTF laid down their weapons on 6 December 2003 under the leadership of Hagrama Mohilary and Shri Hagrama Mohilary was sworn in as the Chief Executive Member (CEM) on 7 December 2003.

The BTC has 46 members (30 seats reserved for scheduled Tribes, 5 seats for non-scheduled tribes and 5 open seats) and 6 seats of which are nominated by Governor of Assam from unrepresented communities. The council appoints a cabinet of 14 executive members each looking after a specific area of control.

=== Districts ===
The Bodoland region is made up of five districts which are further subdivided into 10 Civil Subdivisions and 40 Development Blocks.

The area and population of these districts has been estimated as follows:

No	Name	Area (km^{2})	Population (census 2011)
1	Kokrajhar	3,169	887,142
2	Chirang	1,974	482,162
3	Baksa	1,573	560,925
4	Tamulpur	884	389,150
5	Udalguri	2,012	831,668
	Total	9,612	3,151,047

Under the terms of a peace agreement signed in January 2020, new districts will be created with the existing four districts reorganised into seven districts. The area of the region will be enlarged and will also include two new districts created from areas currently outside the region. The total number of districts within the Bodoland region will therefore be nine. In January 2022, Tamulpur district was created by separating the Tamulpur sub-division from Baksa district. The proposed new districts created from districts currently within the Bodoland region are:

- Gossaigaon district, from Kokrajhar district.
- Bhergaon district, from Udalguri district.

The proposed new districts created from districts currently outside the Bodoland region are:

- Mainaosri district, from Sonitpur district.
- Holongi district, from Biswanath district and Lakhimpur district.

== Geography ==
The geographical boundary of the BTR lies between 26° 7'12'' N to 26° 47' 50'' N Latitude and 89° 47' 40'' E to 92° 18' 30'' E Longitude and is in the Northwestern part of Assam. Kokrajhar town the Administrative Head Quarter lies roughly between 26° 25' N latitude and 90° 16' 38'' E Longitude. The region has beautiful forests rich with a wide variety of flora and fauna.

== Economy ==
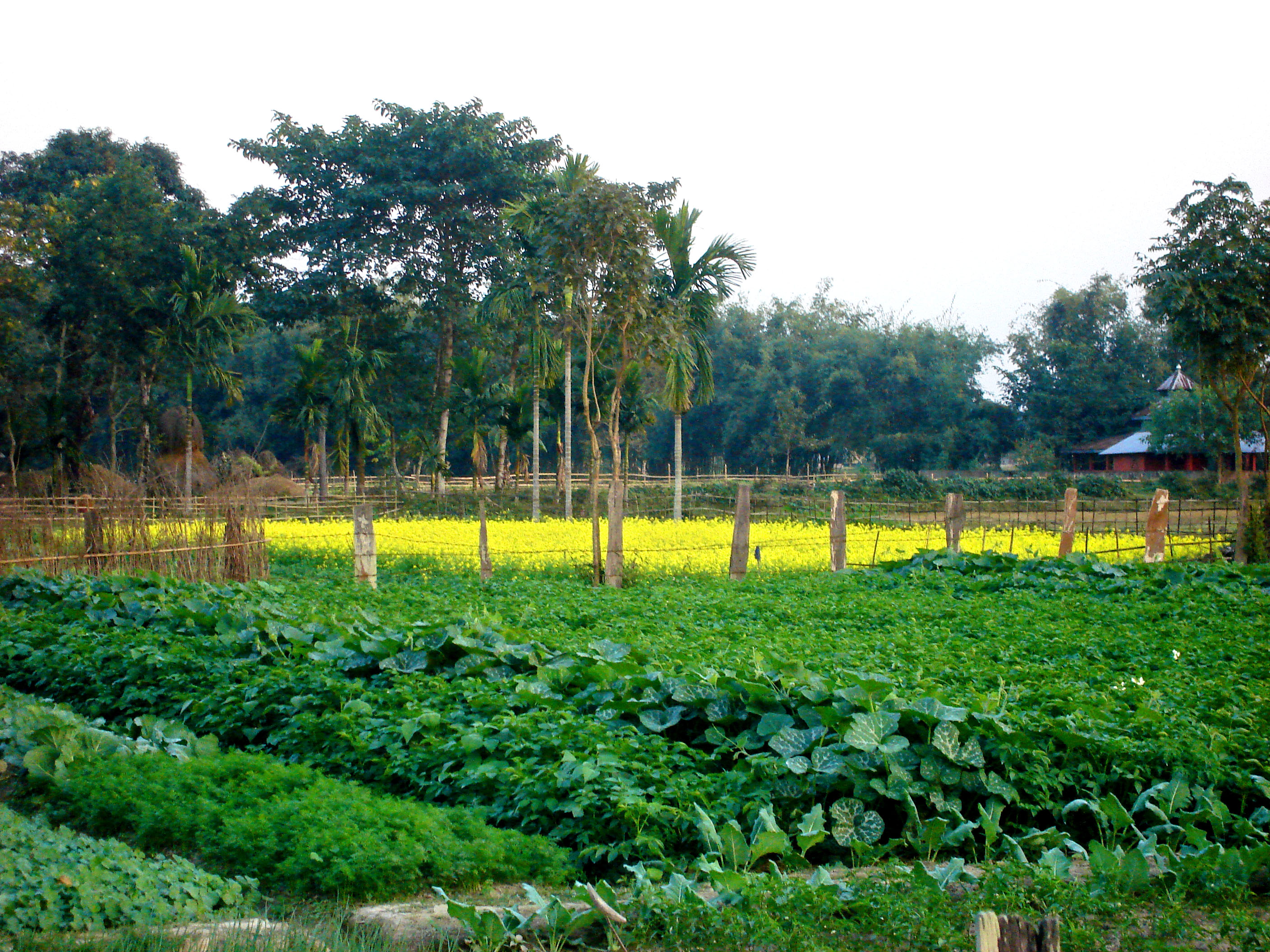
Agriculture in Kokrajhar district

The economy is largely agricultural based and is lagging behind in urbanisation and development. The region is industrially backward with most of its population depending on agriculture for livelihood. Most of the industries like oil, gas and major industries of the state are located in upper Assam.

=== Tourism ===
Tourism in the region is regulated by the department of Bodoland Tourism. Manas National Park is the major tourist attraction of the region. It also has many wildlife sanctuaries, reserve forests, site seeings, picnic spots, and events.

==== Manas National Park ====
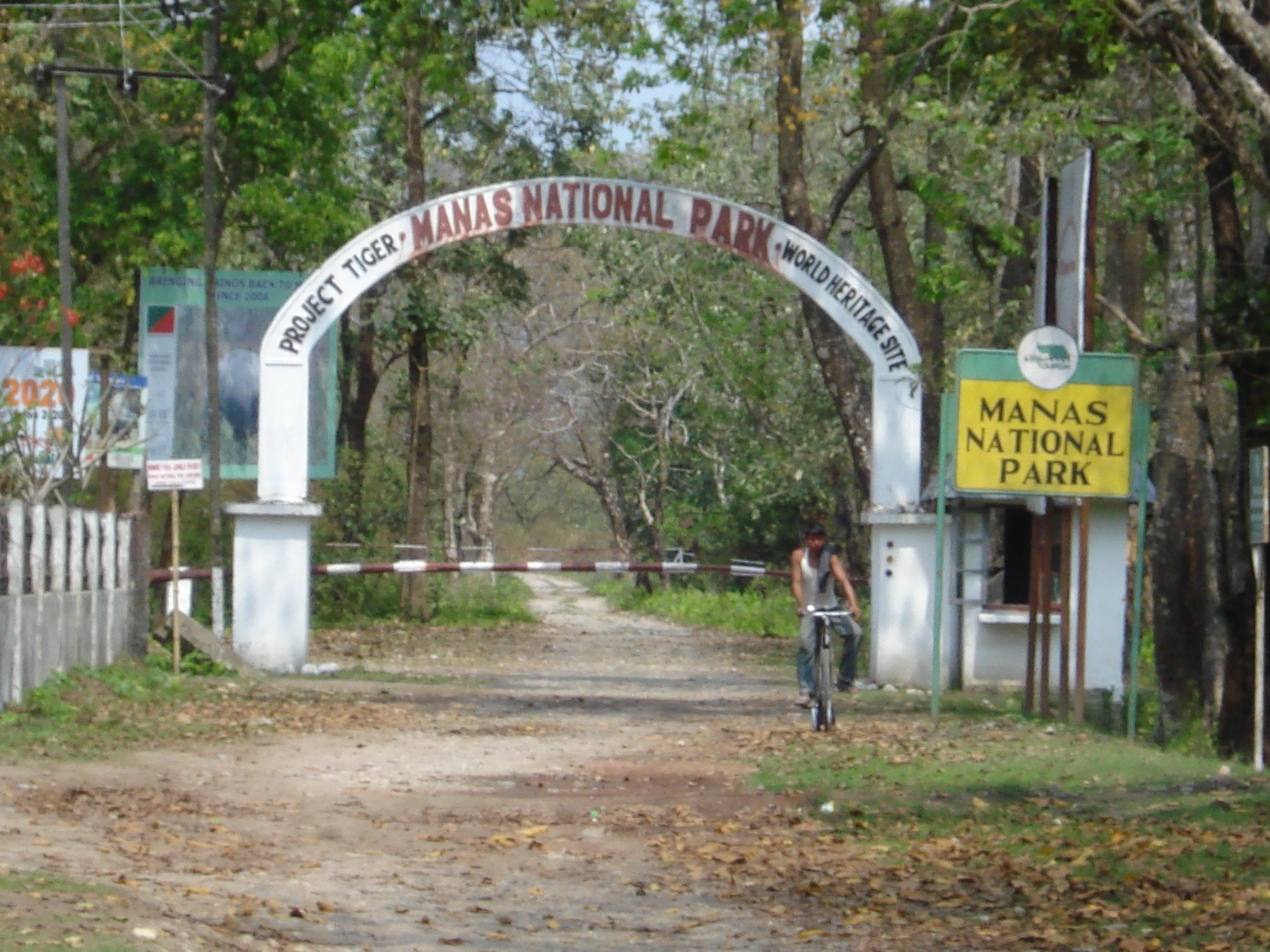
Main entrance of Manas National Park in Chirang

Manas National Park is located in the Himalayan foothills along the international border with Bhutan in Assam. Its landscape includes dense forest,alluvial grasslands,savanna woodlands and riverine habitats, which support a wide variety of wildlife. The park is home to around 60 species of mammals, 42 species of reptiles and approximately 500 species of birds, according to UNESCO. Some of its notable mammals include the Asian elephant, tiger, greater one-horned rhinoceros, gaur and wild water buffalo. It also provides habitat for threatened species such as the pygmy hog, golden langur, hispid hare and Bengal florican. The park is an important habitat for several endangered and threatened species and forms part of the wider landscape used by elephants in the Indo-Bhutan region. Manas is also the core area of the Chirang-Ripu Elephant Reserve. Manas has also been a major site for rhinoceros conservation and reintroduction. It was included in the Indian Rhino Vision 2020 (IRV 2020), a collaborative initiative launched in 2005 to increase the population and distribution of greater one-horned rhinoceroses in Assam. The programme involved the Assam Forest Department, WWF-India, the International Rhino Foundation and other conservation partners, with support from organisations including the Bodoland Territorial Council and the United States Fish and Wildlife Service. Between 2008 and 2012, 18 rhinoceroses were translocated to Manas from Pobitora Wildlife Sanctuary and Kaziranga National Park.

==== Gethsemane Man-made Forest ====
Situated in Udalguri's Bhairabkunda, it is a forest-grown entirely by local JFMC of 35 members with the help of Forest department of Assam. Spread across more than 6 km^{2}, the forest contains more than 1.4 million plus trees of over 35 varieties. A number of animals, birds and reptiles can also be spotted in the area. Visitors can trek through the trail in the forest and stay the night in their guest house.

==== Trekking of Baukungri Hill ====
Baukungri hill trekking is an adventurous event held annually in Kokrajhar, Bodoland Territorial Council. It is organised every year on first day of the year according to the Bodo calendar which falls in mid April.

== Demographics ==
Religions in Bodoland (2011)
1. Hinduism (71.2%)
2. Islam (19.2%)
3. Christianity (9.25%)
4. Others (0.25%)

Many Bodos follow Bathouism but are counted under Hindus. No official data provides the exact population of Bathouism followers.

Language in Bodoland (2011 Census)
Language	Percent
Bodo	30.4%
Assamese	25.5%
Bengali	20.4%
Santali	5.3%
Nepali	3.3%
Kurukh	1.4%
Hindi	1.2%
Rabha	1%
Others	7.3%

=== Population ===
Bodos constitute the largest tribal group in the region numbering around 1.2 million (31.5%) followed by Bengalis, who form the largest minority group as per 2011 Census. The population of the BTC area as per 2011 Census report is 3.2 million out which the ST population is around 38% of which only 3% of the total population live in urban areas. The average density of the population in BTC is 326 per sq.K.m. compared to 340 per sq.K.m. of Assam. Amongst the ST/SC population Bodos, and other Indigenous tribes like Rabha, Sarania-Kachari, Modahi-Kachari and less quantity of Assamese speaking SC caste Kaibarta, Hira, Bania are inhabiting in this area. The other ethnic groups like Assamese speaking Koch-Rajbanshi, Nath-Jogi, Kalita, Sutradhar are inhabiting in large part of BTC. Adivasi communities including Santhal, Oraon etc. are also available in sizeable numbers. Moreover, other general communities like ethnic Assamese Muslims like Garia, Maria and Deshi (Uzani) and large number of Bengali Muslim and Bengali Hindu people, Gorkha and few Hindi speaking people are also found in the Council area.

== Culture ==
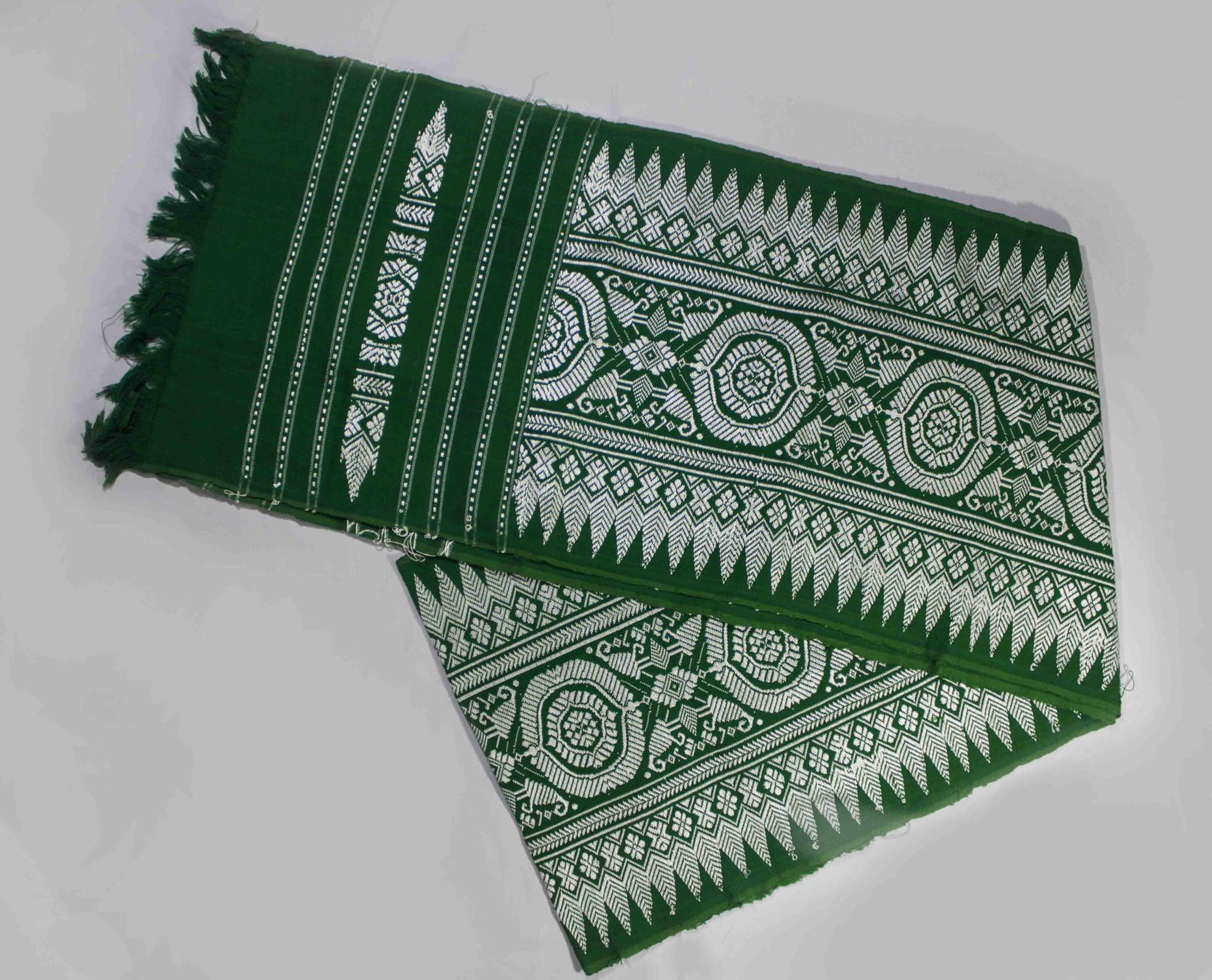
A green coloured Aronai with white Agor (design)

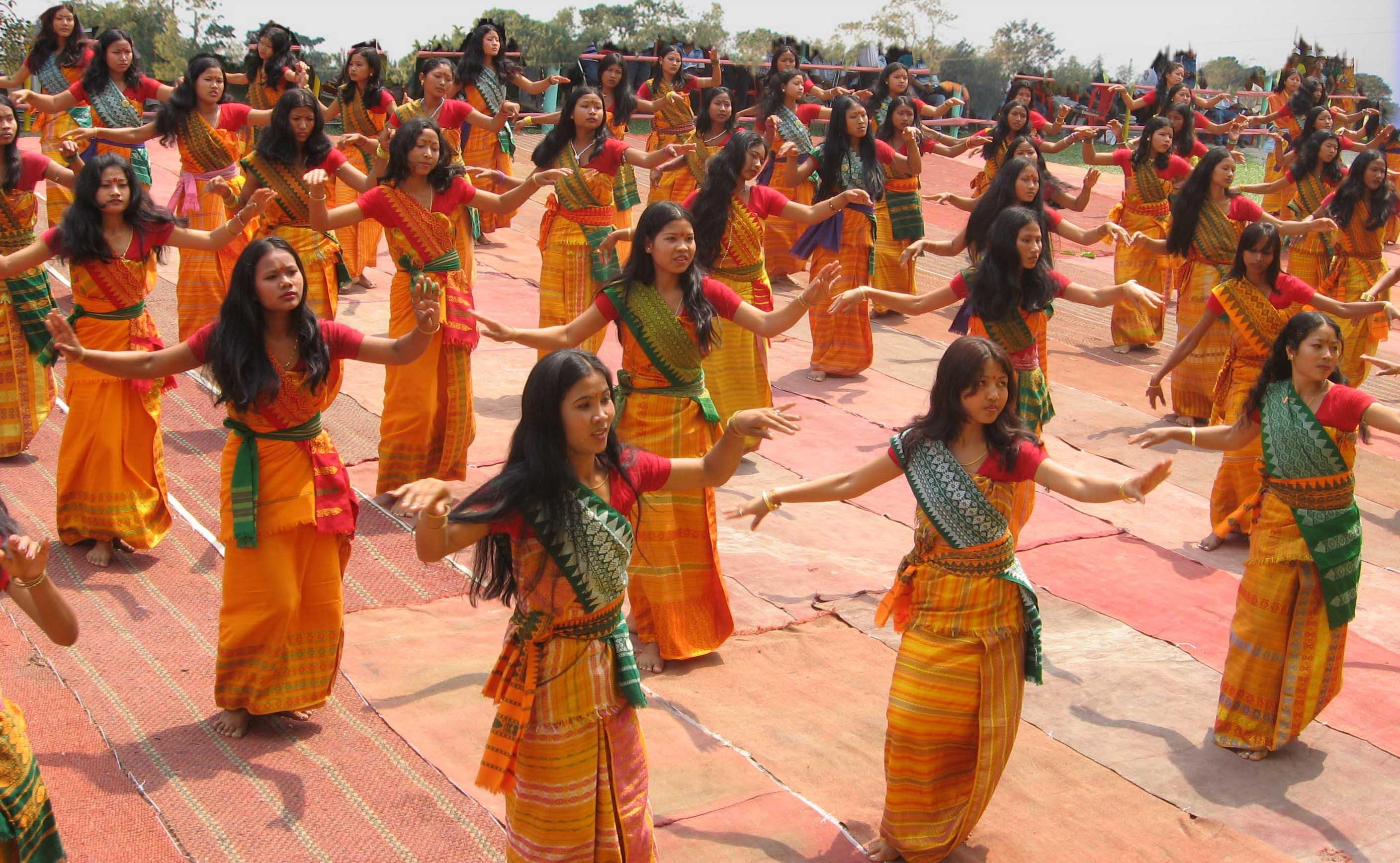
Bodo girls dancing the Daosri-Delai dance

The Bodos have a distinct culture from the rest of the world, ranging from dance and music to festivals and attires.

== Sports ==
Football is popular in the region with clubs like Bodoland FC, competing in Durand Cup; and United Chirang Duar FC playing in the fourth tier of Indian football, I-League 3. Many clubs from the region also participate in the state football league.

== See also ==
- Bodo Kachari Welfare Autonomous Council
- All Bodo Students' Union
- Bodo people
- Bodo culture
- Bodo language
- Bodo Sahitya Sabha
- 2012 Assam violence
- Hill tribes of Northeast India
- North Eastern Council

== Bibliography ==
- Allen, B.C (1905). Assam District Gazetteers-kamrup Vol. 4. The Pioneer Press, Allahabad.
- Brahma, Nirjay Kumar (2008). "Introduction: Interpretation of Bodo or Boro". Socio political institutions in Bodo society (PhD). Gauhati University. hdl:10603/66535.
- Das, Smriti (1998). Assam Bhutan relations with special reference to duars from 1681 to 1949 (PhD). Guwahati University. hdl:10603/67909. Archived from the original on 16 March 2023.
- Deka, Hira Moni (2009). "The Historical Background of Bodo Movement". Politics of identity and the bodo movement in Assam (PhD). Gauhati University. hdl:10603/67844.
- George, Sudhir Jacob (1994). "The Bodo Movement in Assam: Unrest to Accord". Asian Survey. 34 (10): 878–892. doi:10.2307/2644967. JSTOR 2644967.
- Nath, D. (1989). History of the Koch Kingdom, C. 1515-1615. Mittal Publications. ISBN 8170991099.
- Roy, Ajoy (1995). The Bodo Imbroglio. Spectrum Publications. ISBN 8185319588.
- Dikshit, K. R.; Dikshit, Jutta K. (2013). North-East India: Land, People and Economy. Springer Science & Business Media. pp. 375–376. ISBN 978-94-007-7055-3.
- Phuntsho, Karma (2013). The History of Bhutan. Penguin Books. ISBN 9781908323583.
- Phukan, J N (2014). "Ahom-Bhutan Relations with Specific Reference to Royal Bhutanese Embassy Visiting Ahom Capital in 1801" (PDF). Journal of Bhutan Studies. 30 (Summer 2014).
