= Upendranath Brahma =

Boro activist

Upendra Nath Brahma
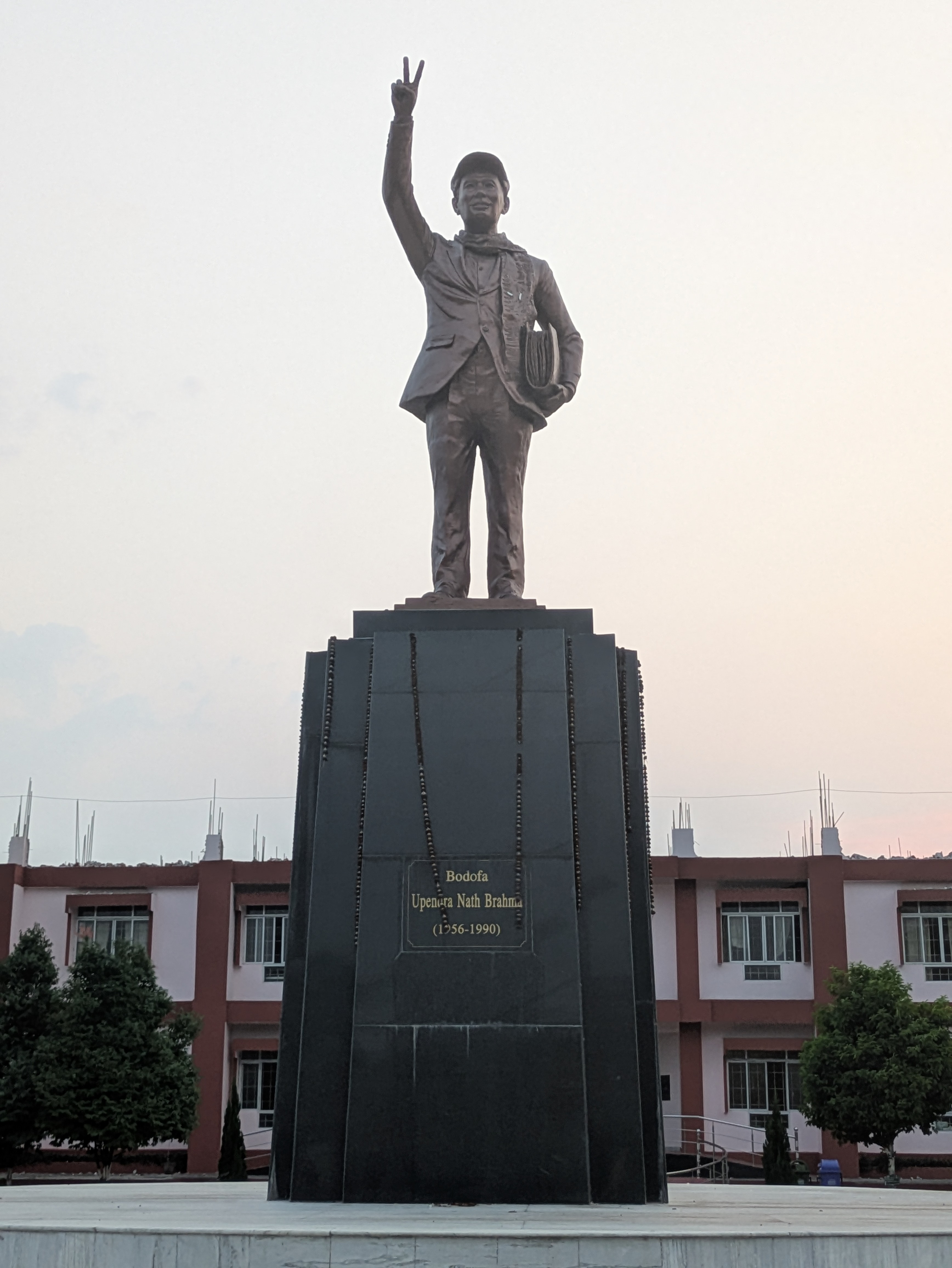
- Statue of Upendranth Brahma
- Born: 31 March 1956; Kokrajhar district, Assam, India
- Died: 1 May 1990 (aged 34); Bombay
- Education: M.Sc. from Gauhati University
- Occupations: Writer, Students' Leader
- Writing career
- Language: Bodo
- Notable works: Why Separate State, The Bodoland Times
- Notable awards: Bodofa

Upendranath Brahma (31 March 1956 – 1 May 1990) was an Indian Bodo social activist and the former president of All Bodo Students' Union.

== Early life and education ==
Brahma was born in Boragari village of Dotma, a small township at Kokrajhar district of Assam, India. He was a son of Mr. Monglaram Brahma and Ms. Lefsri Brahma. He was the fifth, and youngest, child. He was called "Thopen" during his childhood. He grew up in poverty.

From 1963, Brahma studied at various schools, including Dotma High School, Kokrajhar High School and, in 1973, at Sakti Ashram High and Vocational School under the guidance of Swamiji. In 1975, he passed the matriculation examination in the first division with letter marks in Mathematics. Thereafter he obtained a BSc with honours degree in Physics from Cotton College before enrolling at Gauhati University in 1981 for his MSc degree. Brahma also worked as a graduate science teacher at the Nehru Vocational High School in Gossainichina, and studied for a BA at Kokrajhar College (now Kokrajhar University) during that period. He obtained his BA in 1985 and his MSc in 1986.

Brahma was elected as the President of the Goalpara District Students Union in 1978–79. He was vice-president of the All Bodo Students Union between 1981–1983 and president from 1986. Through this body he worked for the education and wellbeing of the community, which he believed to be losing its culture. Under his leadership, the ABSU agreed to include political issues as part of its agenda to give political matureness to the students.

== Death ==
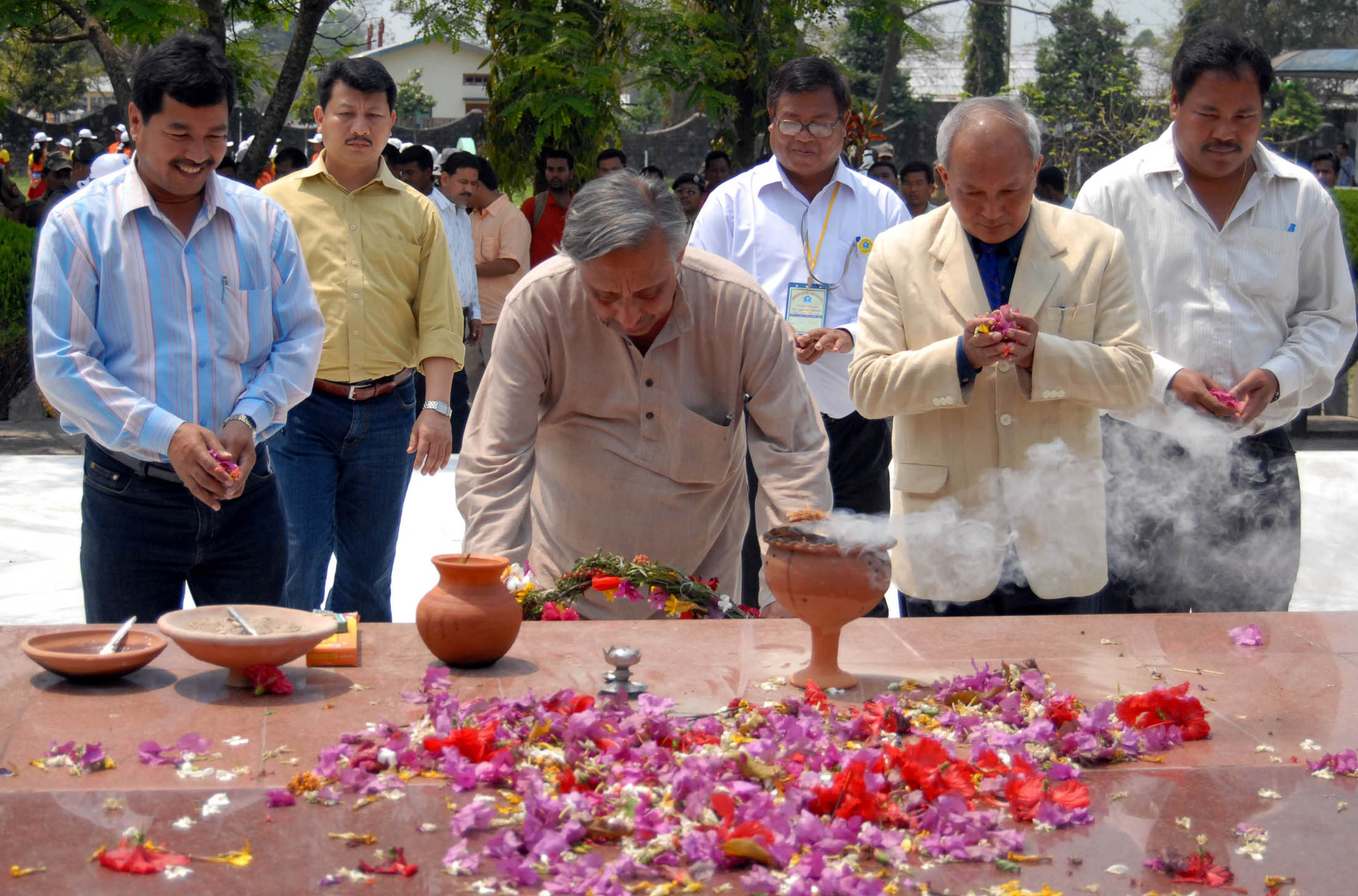
Mani Shankar Aiyar paying homage to Bodofa

Brahma died at Tata Memorial Cancer Hospital in Mumbai on 1 May 1990 as a consequence of blood cancer. His body was taken to Kokrajhar and then buried at Dotoma on 4 May. The ground where Brahma was buried is now known as "Thulungapuri".

== Honours ==
The title of Bodofa (Guardian of Bodos) was posthumously conferred upon Brahma on 8 May 1990 in recognition of his vision and leadership. His life is celebrated each year on the anniversary of his death, which is now called Bodofa Day.

A 21-foot-tall (6.4 m) bronze statue of him was unveiled in Kokrajhar on the tenth anniversary of his death.

== See also ==
- Bineshwar Brahma
- All Bodo Students' Union
- Bodoland Territorial Region
- Bodoland Territorial Council
- Bodo People
- Boro Language
- Bodo Sahitya Sabha
