= Sabharam Basumatary =

Indian Politician

Member of Assam Legislative Assembly
- Incumbent
- Assumed office 4 May 2026
- Preceded by: Jiron Basumatary
- Constituency: Gossaigaon

Personal details
- Party: Bodoland People's Front
- Parent: Manindra Basumatary (father)
- Profession: Politician

Sabharam Basumatary (born 1959) is an Indian politician from Assam. He is a member of the Assam Legislative Assembly from Gossaigaon in Kokrajhar district representing the Bodoland People's Front.

== Early life ==
Basumatary is from Dotma, Assam. He is son of late Manindra Basumatary. He did his graduation in 1986 from a college affiliated with Guwahati University.

== Career ==
Basumatary became an MLA for the first time winning the 2026 Assam Legislative Assembly election from Gossaigaon Assembly constituency representing the Bodoland People's Front. He polled 44,394 votes and defeated his nearest rival, Phedricson Hansdak of the Jharkhand Mukti Morcha, by a margin of 22,977 votes.
