= Daina =

Daina may refer to:

- Daina (Latvia), Latvian folksong
- Daina (Lithuania), Lithuanian folksong
- Daina (name), Latvian and Lithuanian female given name
- Daina (organization), Lithuanian cultural organization that functioned in (1899–1915)

== Other ==
- Daina (film), a 1984 Indian Bodo documentary film
- Daina (software)
- Siata Daina, an Italian car
