= Mithius Tudu =

Indian politician

Revenue Minister of the Government of Assam
- In office 7 June 2002 - 21 May 2006
- Chief Minister: Tarun Gogoi

Minister for Labour and Employment
- In office 1991 - 1996
- Chief Minister: Hiteswar Saikia

Member of Assam Legislative Assembly
- In office 2001 - 2006
- Preceded by: Tajendra Narzary
- Succeeded by: Majendra Narzary
- Constituency: Gossaigaon
- In office 1957 - 1991
- Preceded by: Jatindra Narayan Das
- Succeeded by: Tajendra Narzary
- Constituency: Gossaigaon

Personal details
- Died: 10 July 2017 (aged 92) Siliguri, West Bengal
- Party: Indian National Congress
- Other political affiliations: Independent
- Spouse: Rahe Sakm (m. 1958)
- Children: 4
- Occupation: Politician

Mithius Tudu (c. 1930 – 10 July 2017) was an Indian politician from the state of Assam. He was an 8 time Member of Assam Legislative Assembly for Gossaigaon. He was also a Minister in the Hiteswar Saikia cabinet and Tarun Gogoi Cabinet.

== Education ==
Tudu was educated at Sapatgram Bengali high school and at Cotton College in Gauhati. After graduating from Cotton College, Tudu joined Grahampur High School as a teacher.

== Political career ==
Tudu was the Indian National Congress candidate for Gossaigaon in the 1957 Assam Legislative Assembly election. He received 8361 votes and became MLA for the constituency.

Tudu was again the Congress candidate for Gossaigaon in the 1962 Assam Legislative Assembly election. He received 7350 votes and was reelected unopposed for the constituency.

In the 1967 Assam Legislative Assembly election, Tudu was again reelected unopposed and received 19326 votes.

He was reelected in the 1972 Assam Legislative Assembly election, he received 22242, 66.32% of the total vote. He defeated his nearest opponent by 16503 votes.

He was again reelected in the 1978 Assam Legislative Assembly election, he received 14562 votes, 35.18% of the total vote, and defeated his nearest opponent by 5191 votes.

He was again reelected in the 1983 Assam Legislative Assembly election. He received 16141 votes, 41.72% of the total vote. He defeated his nearest rival by 7571 votes. He was made a minister in the Hiteswar Saikia cabinet.

He was reelected in the 1985 Assam Legislative Assembly election, polling 21548 votes, 39.52% of the total vote. He defeated his nearest rival by 13722 votes.

In 1991, he received 20970 votes, 24.98% of the total vote. He came second to independent candidate Tajendra Nazary by 38339 votes, after being an MLA for 34 years.

In the 1996 Assam Legislative Assembly election, Tudu was the Congress candidate for Gossaigaon again. He received 19418 votes, 27.04% of the total vote, again losing to Tajendra Nazary.

In the 2001 Assam Legislative Assembly election, Tudu was again the congress candidate. He received 61504 votes, 54.92% of the total vote and again became MLA for Gossaigaon. He was made a minister in the Tarun Gogoi cabinet. He did not seek reelection in 2006 when his son became the Congress candidate but lost.

== Personal life and death ==
Tudu enjoyed sports and reading. He married Rahe Sakm in 1958 and they had 1 son and 3 daughters. His son, Chrisostum Tudu, unsuccessfully sought the Gossaigaon seat in 2006 and 2011.

In July 2017, Tudu suffered a stroke at his residence in Grahampur. A week later on 10 July 2017, Tudu died due to old-age ailment at Subham Private Nursing Home at Siliguri in West Bengal on Monday at around 12.30 pm, the same day as congress minister Rameswar Dhanowar. Chief Minister Sarbananda Sonowal and Leader of the Opposition Debabrata Saikia both paid tribute, with Sonowal saying “Both Tudu and Dhanowar were people’s representatives for long years and had contributed significantly to the socio-political life of Assam. Their contributions as politicians and social workers will be remembered for long.” His body was buried at his birthplace Grahampur under Gossaigaon subdivision in Kokrajhar district.
