= Enaini Panjari =

- Bodo: इनायनि फानजारि
- Directed by: Khanindra Bodosa
- Story by: Khanindra Bodosa
- Starring: Jayanta Narzary; Reshma Mushahary
- Release date: 1995
- Language: Bodo

Enaini Panjari is a 1995 Indian Bodo political film directed by Khanindra Bodosa and starring Jayanta Narzary, Ashok, Kabita, Maya and Reshma Mushahary in the lead roles. It was released in 1995. The film was produced by Bwirathi Production Limited.

== Production ==
It is the first film presentation of Bwirathi Production Limited from Kokrajhar district.

== Soundtrack ==
Rahen Brahma, Rupen, Brojen and Pendla composed the music for the soundtracks and lyrics were penned by Rahen Brahma and Pupen. The music was popular hit like songs "Bobe Raijwni Rajkhungur Nwng", "Bilingfang Horni Okhafwr Gaodang" and "Hajwni Dwi Srai Srai". The famous singers Bigrai Brahma, Sulekha Basumatary and Reena to voice the actors.

Tracklist
No.	Title	Artist (s)/Speakers	Length
1.	"Talir Bifang Derhabai"	Bigrai Brahma	05:33
2.	"Ang Nonga Pagwla"	Bigrai Brahma, Chankya Brahma	06:25
3.	"Hajwni Dwi Srai Srai"	Sulekha Basumatary	06:06
4.	"Bilifang Horni Okhafwr Gaodang"	Bigrai Brahma, Sulekha Basumatary	6:35
5.	"Bobe Raijwni Rajkhungur Nwng"	Bigrai Brahma, Reena	05:11
6.	"Jiuni Sona Angni"	Chankya Brahma, Reena	04:08
Total length:			24:09

== See also ==
- List of Bodo-language films
