= Saralpara =

Village in Assam, India

Saralpara F.V Saralpara Village
- Saralpara
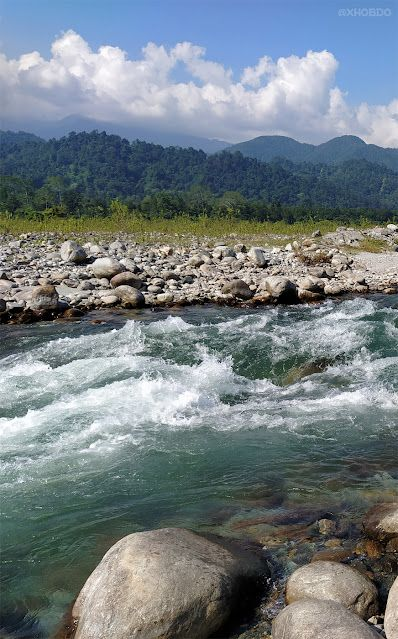

- Location in Assam, India Saralpara F.V (India)
- Coordinates: 26°50′0″N 90°15′17″E
- Country: India
- State: Assam
- District: Kokrajhar

Government
  - Body: Saralpara Municipal Board/VCDC

Area
  - Total: 2.76 km^{2} (1.07 sq mi)

Population (2011)
  - Total: 942
  - Density: 410/km^{2} (1,100/sq mi)

Languages
  - Official: Bodo
- Time zone: UTC+5:30 (IST / BST)
- ISO 3166 code: IN-AS
- Vehicle registration: AS-26
- Website: Saralpara.org

Saralpara F.V is a village located in Taluk of Kokrajhar district Assam, India. The village is 56 km (35 mi) from Kokrajhar town and near the border with The Kingdom of Bhutan.

== Geography ==
Saralpara is in the Kokrajhar district of Assam. The total geographical area of village is 2.76 km^{2} (1.07 sq mi) (1.07 sq mi). It shares a border with Bhutan, which is approximately 226 km away from Guwahati city via the NH-27.

== Population census ==
According to 2011 census, Saralpara has a population of 942 people, of whom 644 are male and 298 female. The population of children aged 0 to 6 is 51, accounting for 5.41% of the total population.

Saralpara hamlet has a sex ratio of roughly 463, compared to the state average of 958. Saralpara has an 86.84% literacy rate, with 93.94% males and 71.48% females being literate. Saralpara has 0.96% Scheduled Caste and 51.06% Scheduled Tribe population.
