= List of Bodo-language films =

This is a list of films in the Bodo language organized by year of release.

== Early Cinema (1984–1999) ==
Year	Film	Director	Artist(s)	Producer	Production
1984	Daina	Amar Hazarika	Ghana Kt. Basumatary		Bodo Film Society
1985	Jariminni Khongkor	Garlabata Basumatary	Harkeswar Daimary		
1986	Alayaron	Jwngdao Bodosa	Amar Narzary, Rohila Brahma		Bodosa Film Production Society
1987	Jiuni Simang	Amar Hazarika	Tikendrajit Narzary, Anjali Brahma		
1991	Annaini Radai	Parameswar Boro			
1991	Khwmsi Lama	Jwngdao Bodosa	Fuleswari Brahma		
1992	Swrmwn Nwng	Janosh Mahiliya & Kanak Basumatary	Madhu Mahan Lahary, Anjali Daimary		
1992	Asha	Khanindra Bodosa	Rajorshi, Deeptimaye, Tarat Narzary, Raja Brahma	Indira Musahary	
1992	Julee	Gopinath Brahma	Phungkha Brahma, Kokila Brahma Choudhury		
1993	Gwrbwni Mijing			Mala Daimary	
	Basiram Jwhwlao				Swdwmsri Harimu Afad
1994	Khiterni Or	Premananda Muchahary	Raja, Runu, Uttar, Santiram Basumatary	Mala Daimary	
1995	Habila	Modaram	Gobardhan, Raja, Jamuna	Mala Daimary	Daimary Film Production
1995	Hagramayao Jinahari	Jwngdao Bodosa	Tijendrajit Narzary, Anjali Bodosa		
1995	Enaini Panjari	Khanindra Bodosa	Jayanta Narzary, Ashok Basumatary, Reshma Mushahary		
1996	Hangma	Mala Daimary			
1997	Duphangni Solo	Pinky Brahma Chaudhury			
1997	Gumur	Rahen Brahma	Ashok Basumatary		
1997	Mohor	Modaram	Arobindo, Jyotsna, Archana	Mala Daimary	MD Production
1997	Nwjwr	S M Daimari	Milan, Kanchan	Mala Daimari	MD Production
1998	Nwngni Thakai Angni Jwnwm	Premananda Muchahary	Dhan, Runu		
1999	Annai Arw Mwjang Mwnnai	Mala Daimary			

== 2000-04 ==
Year	Film	Director	Artist(s)	Producer	Production
2000	Hastainai Gwsw			Mala Daimary	
2000	Habilasha Mwnse Mijing	Gautam Boro			
2001	Thungenai Dara	Mala Daimary			
2001	Swrangni Lama	Kamal Bhusan Boro			
2001	Gwdan Muga	Jwngdao Bodosa			
2001	Udkari	Kargeswar Musahary	Alen, Phulsree, Ponin		Alongbar Bodo Film Production
	Sondromali	Sanraja Basumatary			Rongjali Film Production
2002	Benwtho Songsar	Mala Daimary			
2002	Songali	Khanindra Bodosa	Umesh Basumatary, Ringkumoni Basumatary		
2003	Jwnwmni Unao	Chabin, Uttam	Baidimwia, Sanjita Boro,		
2003	Laoga arw Gobda				
2004	Gwrwnthini Unao	Kandaram Basumatary			
2004	Kapalni Lirnai	Rojen Narzary, Modaram	Amar Narzary, Adam, Gitanjali Brahma, Simpul		Nijwra Film Society
	Gwrbw Nwjwr	Khanindra Bodosa	Raju K.B, Rinkumoni, Joba		

== 2005-09 ==
Year	Film	Director	Artist(s)	Producer	Production
2005	3 Girls and the Golden Cocoon	Jwngdao Bodosa	Anjali Bodosa, Natalie Roth, Brandee Steger		
2005	Barse Bibar	Mosko Brahma			
2005	Bhoohut	Laha Brahma	Dhanu, Simanta Basumatary		
2005	Jowse Jwkhwndw Gwrwnthi	Amar Narzary	Amar Narzary, Simpul		
2005	Lwrgi	Manjil	Manjil, Fulsree		Baokhungri Film Centre
2005	Mwkhthangkhor Hajwni Khwnaywi Solo	Manjil	Manjil, Mosco		
2005	Sakondra	Manjil	Rajorshi		
2005	Simangna Mwktang	Rojen Narzary	Rajib Brahma, Sangina Brahma		
	Bikhunjw No 1	Prasenjit Brahma	Ujala, Sanjib, Geetanjali		
2006	Onnaini Dowleng	Tulu Boro	Dilip Basumatary, Geetanjali Brahma	Tulu Boro	Tulus Creation
2006	Bilwmani Daha	Probin Goyary	Jumu, Kishor, Nomi, Prabin	Raju Swargiary	RS Production
2006	Jowse Jowkhwndw Gwrwnthi	Rojen Narzary			
	Gwjwn Songsar Nagirnanwi		Rajib, Masoom		
2007	Bihamjw Rani	Rojen Narzary	Noni Rani Narzary, Rajib Brahma, Sangina Brahma		
2007	Hangma Hangsa	Probin Goyary	Omprakash Kherkatary, Ranen Basumatary, Sobita		
2007	Maojini Adob	Chabin Wary	Ranen Basumatary, Silbia Basumatary		
2007	Bijaojali		Ranen Basumatary		
2008	Ayim Gwywi Laodumni Simang	Probin Goyary	Dilip Basumatary, Masoom Brahma		
2008	Gwswao Khamkhangw	David Ray	Sukhbir, Pampuli Goyary		
2008	Kamglinai Gwsw	Rojen Narzary	Rajib Brahma, Pampuli Goyary		
2008	Mugani Banda	Rajorshi Basumatary	Rajorshi Basumatary, Phiteng		
2008	Phathwilay Bisinay	Khanindra Bodosa	Dwimalu, Sangina		Mwshakhaori Film Production
2008	Wanted	Rabi Narzary	Rabi Narzary, Esha Basumatary		RN Films
2008	Tenson				
2009	Bikhaya Gaow Khugaya Geoa	Prabin Goyary	Dilip Basumatary, Masoom Brahma		
2009	Daini Saja	Khanindra Bodosa	Rajorshi, Sukhbir, Sangina, Jeuti, Rimjhim		PBS Film Production
2009	Gaglobnai	Bidhan Basumatary	Sumit Daimary, Parboti Wary		Bijni Film Production & Film Studio (Co-op) Society
2009	Hainamuli	Phaylaw Basumatary	Dwimasa Brahma, Jwngsrang Brahma, Jagat Boro, Riju Swargiary		Bangbula Film Production
2009	Hajw Khoroni Sikhla	Prabin Goyary	Dilip Basumatary, Sobita		
2009	Hor Badi Khwmshi	Bhaben	Sanjib, Bhanu, Amar Narzary		Maijli Film Production
2009	Jethw	Khanindra Bodosa	Dwimalu, Geetanjali, Nikunjay, Swapan Narzary		Mwshakhaori Film Production
2009	Nwgwrao Dafwi Sona	Phaylaw Basumatary	Kamal Lahary		Wave Music Assam
2009	Somni Guthal	Bhaben	Sanjib, Sanjita, Amar Narzary		Maijli Film Production
2009	Texi Driver	Khanindra Bodosa	Umesh, Ambika Giri		Gaurang Film Production
2009	Gobla Sikhao	Phaylaw Basumatary	Nagen, Phaylaw, Prabin, Mahini, Ansumwi, Dinesh, Rajashri	Nagen Brahma Daimari	NBD Film Production
2009	Gudung Gudung Gorom Gorom	Purna Basumatary	Purna, Mosco, Pitheng, Bwhwithi		Kham Siphung Film Production
2009	Khamglinay Gwsw	Rojen Narzary	Rajib, Pampuli Goyary		Dufaolu Film Production

== 2010 ==
Film	Release date	Director	Artists	Producer	Production
Delhi To Bodoland	2010	Swapan Kumar Brahma	Sukhbir Karzee, Masoom Brahma	Swapan Kumar Brahma	
Sikhla Mwjang	2010	Anjay Daimary	Anjay Daimary, Sansumwi Basumatary, Ratan Swrgiary	Anjay Daimary	AD Film Creations
Simang - A tale of life	2010	Dipak Kr Ramchiary	Dilip Basumatary, Masoom Brahma		Mithinga Film Industrial Society
Annaini Jinjri	2010		Rajib Brahma, Ronjona Basumatary		
Daoha	2010	Rojen Narzary	Rajib Brahma, Nijwm Mushahary, Amar Narzary		
Gwrbwni Mwdwi	2010	Phylaw Basumatary	Dilip Basumatary, Sangina Brahma		
Fwthai Khebso	2010	Kamaleswar Basumatary	Jagat Boro		
Hainamuli 2	2010	Jagat Boro	Dwimasa, Jwngsrang, Jagat, Riju Swargiary		
Hongla Sikhao	2010	Phaylaw Basumatary	Probin Goyary, Phaylaw Basumatary		
Tension	2010	Amar Narzary	Rajib Brahma, Moni Goyary		
Khalao Khasao	2010		Rajib Brahma, Sangina Brahma		
Somayna Bibarni Gesao Dentha	2010		Monojit, Jeuti		
Kungfu King	2010	Thaklai			

== 2011 ==
Film	Release date	Director	Cast	Producer	Production
Angnw Finnai Nangow	2011	Rojen Narzary	Sukhbir Karjee, Pirpila, Dethsung, Sonai		
Ansula Mwdai	2011	Probin Goyary	Omprakash Khertary, Jonali Basumatary		
Dwrfw Dwrfw	2011		Rajib Brahma, Masoom Brahma, Riju Swargiary		
Dasw Bujibay	2011	Prabin Boro	Junali Daimary, Prabin		
Gwrbwni Denkhw	2011	Jogot Boro	Rajib Brahma, Jwngsrang Brahma, Jogot Boro, Dwimasa Brahma		Bangbula Film Productions
Hainamuli 3	2011	Jogot Boro	Dwimasa Brahma, Jwngsrang Brahma, Jogot Boro, Mwkthang Basumatary, Riju Swargiary		Bangbula Film Productions
Lajibla Kaji Gwmayw	23 September 2011	Swapan Kumar Brahma	Swapan Kumar, Rajib Brahma, Pampuli Goyary, Jagat Boro	Swapan Kumar and Pradip Kumar Basumatary	Bodoland Swrjilu Film Production
Nwngni Onnayao	2011	Baiju Singh	Sukhbir Karjee, Masoom Brahma		Himala Arts
Thaklai	2011	Thaklai Narzary	Jwngsar Basumatary, Thaklai Narzary		
Wrong Number 2	2011	Rabi Narzary	Rabi Narzary, Jwngsrang Brahma, Esha Basumatary		

== 2012 ==
Film	Release date	Director	Artists	Producer	Production
Asokanda	2012		Jwngsrang Brahma, Dwimasa Brahma, Amar Narzary, Junu Basumatary		
Baarhoonkhani Thwi	2012	Chiraj Baglary	Sukhbir Karjee, Rajib Brahma, Nijwm Brahma		
Bantha	2012	Dipak Kr Ramchiary	Kapil Basumatary, Sangina Brahma		Mithinga Film Industrial Society
Benw Be	2012	Sanjib Kr Brahma	Abinash, Pampuli Goyary	Sanjib Kr Brahma	Lwrgi Theatre Group
Bikhani Or	2012	Prabin Boro	Prabin Boro, Birmal Mushahary		
Boroni Greesti	2012	Bidesh Suba	Bidesh Suba		
Bonzar	2012	Thaklai Narzary	Thaklai Narzary		
Gaba Swlayw	2012		Rajib Brahma, Pampuli Goyary, Jonali Basumatary, Geolang		
Gwmwrnai Alari	2012	Mizing Narzary (1st)	Mizing Narzary, Punam Basumatary		Lion Film Production
Jugni Baar	2012		Ranen Basumatary, Jwngshrang, Purna		
Julini Unao	2012	Jesus Kherkatary	Dinesh Ramchiary, Jonali Basumatary		
Khwinasanti	2012	Chiraj Baglary	Ranen Basumatary, Pampuli Goyary		
Mr. Bodoland	2013	Probin Goyary	Omprakash Kherkatary, Pampuli Goyary, Jonali Basumatary	Hemani Goyary	
Mwjang Mwnnaia Bidinw	2012	Kamaleswar Basumatary	Dinesh Ramchiary, Eyerish, Jwngsrang Brahma	Pranita Kachari Goyary	Rwisumwi Film Production

== 2013 ==
Film	Release date	Director	Artists	Producer	Production
Hainamuli 4	2013	Jagat Boro	Jwngsrang Brahma, Dimasha Boro, Jagat Boro, Riju Swargiary		Bangbula Film Production Presents
Gwswm Jwmwi	2013	Gajen Raj & Dipak Instri	Nayan, Maidangsri		
Hwmbla	2013	Phylaw Basumatary	Mosko Brahma, Jonali Basumatary		
Maoria	2013	Raja Narzary	Kwrwm Mushahary, Kamla, Samson Basumatary, Dhanika Mushahary	Raja, Rupali, Sanjay	Rupali Films Production
Ang Nwngkhow Baonw Haya	2013	UC Brahma	Fwilao, Rama, Dwimalu, Maya, Abinash		JD Film Production
Mr. Ranger Babu	2013	Probin Goyary	Dilip Basumatary		
Rojeni Radai	2013		Omprakash Kherkatary, Eyerish		
Nokhor Songsar	2013	Rabi Narzary	Rabi Narzary, Riju	Rabi Narzary	RN Films
Simang Fara	2013	Raju	Jwngsrang Brahma, Dimasha Boro	Dahit & Indra	BHA
Thwd Phagli Phagli	2013	Chiraj Baglary	Geolang Brahma, Jirina Brahma		
Thwinai Baidi Jiu	2013	Mizing Narzary	Mizing Narzary, Jumu Rani Brahma		

== 2014 ==
Film	Release date	Director	Cast	Producer	Production
Ambasi Horni Unao	2014	Mizuram Swargiary	Anjay Daimary, Urmila Basumatary	Anjay Daimary	AD Film Creations
Angni Bikha	2014	Prabin Goyary	Alongbar Goyary, Juhi Narzary, Panja		Ganda Khungur Film Production
Annaini Andwao	2014	Swmdwn Boro	Dinesh Ramchiary		
Bima Badi Bajwi	2014	Rabi Narzary	Rabi Narzary, Riju Brahma, Esha Basumatary, Jwngsrang Brahma	Rabi Narzary	RN Films
Daoga	2014	Narzary Raja	Wingckel Narzary, Bruce Boro, Bidhan Narzary, Samaina Basumatary, Jowyen	Bhaskar Jyoti Das	White Feather Movie Pictures
Gwja Sindoorni Ali	2014	Chiraj Baglary	Geolang Brahma, Pooja Mushahary		Sindoor Film Production Presents
Fanjari	2014	Swmdwn Boro	Swmaosar, Swmdwn, Pranita	Swmdwn Boro	JBNS Film Production
Fanjarini Dao Mwina	2014	Jitu Mani Roy	Masoom, Samaina Basumatary, Sanuma Basumatary, Arup Rava, Mohini Ramchiary, Daohang Mushahary	Khandab, Sangita, Geetashree, Gokul Basumatary	Friendship Cine Production
Jaiklongao Bema Je	2014	Kamleswar Basumatary	Uday, Sangina Brahma, Kamleswar Basumatary, Jwngsrang Brahma		
Hainamuli 5	2014	Jagat Boro	Dimasha Boro, Jwngsrang, Jagat Boro		Bangbula Film Production Presents
Jwhwlao	2014	Thaklai Narzary	Lingsar Basumatary, Pooja Mushahary, Thaklai Narzary		
Jwkhwm	2014	Pangkaj Lahary	James Mushahary, Sangina Brahma		
Khitter	2014	Naisrang	Bhupen Rb, Jesus Kherkatary, Rubul		Naisrang Motion Pictures
Megon Gwsa	2014	Siboraj Basumatary	Siboraj, Tarendra Nath Basumatary		Dao Kwowo Film Production
Mwdwini Bana	2014	Prabin Boro	Lipika Brahma, Junali Daimary		
Nerswn	2014	Prabin Goyary	Alongbar Goyary, Juhi Narzary		Ganda Khungur Film Production
Nijwm	15 September	Ganesh Boro	Arup Rava, Maidangsri		Gwrlwi House Presents
Or	2014	Rabi Narzary	Rabi Narzary, Esha Basumatary		
Khwisar	2014	R. Rwnao	Rimal, Masoom Brahma, Mulug Boro		Maibong Nwgwr Film Productions
Thwiyao Barnai Bibar	2014	Mwktang Basumatary	Swmkhwr, Jumu Rani Brahma		

== 2015 ==
Film	Release date	Director	Artists	Producer	Production
Ada Khoro Geder	2015	Probin Goyary	Alongbar Goyary, Juhi Narzary, Panja, Lipika Brahma, Jesus Kherkatary		
Ani Thani	2015	Siboraj Basumatary	Siboraj Basumatary		
Annaiya Mabadi	2015	Mwktang Basumatary	Prianka, Jumu Rani Brahma,		
Annai Gwywi Anthai Bikha	2015	Jesus Kherkatary			
Bathul Raja	2015	Guru Pabitra	Uday, Monalisha Boro		
Bibaan	2015	Thaklai Narzary	Jwngsar Basumatary, Swrang Narzary, Dengkhw Borgayary, Swmkhwr Brahma, Asha Brahma		Srang Film Production
Bwrai Bathouni Mahima	2015	Pabindra Daimari	Nex Z Su, Karabi Basumatary, Mwnswm Boro	Lokeswar Basumatary	Madhurima Creations Production
Dainaya Swr?	2015	Prabin Basumatary	Rimal, Jonali Basumatary		Prabha Rani Film Production
Dau Huduni Methai	2015	Manju Borah	Reshma Mushahary, Ahalya Daimary		
Fandaisula	2015	Abinash	Lingshar Basumatary, Khwmta, Shima, Neha, Taklai		Bibar Film Production
Firainai	2015	Chiraj Baglary	Geolang Brahma, Masoom Brahma, Pooja Mushahary		
Fwislini Andwao	2015	Mwkthang	Boken Boro, Mijing Narzary, Jumu Rani Brahma		Lion Film Production
Fwimal Mijink	2015	Gwjwn Boro	Mira Goyary, Jugami Basumatary		Jakhangfu Film Production
Hadan	2015	Dinesh Kaman	Prabin Boro, Lipika Brahma		
Gwsw Hwnaya Fwimal	2015	Bimal Narzary	Didul, Songina Basumatary, Urzum, Mijing		
Hero	2015	Rabi Narzary	Rabi Narzary, Pampuli Goyary		R.N Films
Jathai	2015	Suruj Bhoda	Lipika Brahma, Purna Swargiary		
Jinir	2015	Pankaj Lahary	James Mushahary, Sangina Brahma		
Jiuni Lamayao	4 August	Naisrang Goyary	Mwnabili, Juli, Sanjana	Jitu Basumatary	Sindoor Film Production Presents
Jwng Gejen Nonga	2015	Probin Goyary	Prabin Goyary, Maidangsree		SSC Film Production
Jwnwmao Nwngkhowlo Hastaidwngmwn	2015	Swapan Kr. Brahma	Pradip Basumatary, Pooja Mushahary		
Lamani Jengshi	2015	Rajarshi	Fungka, Swrangsing, Kobita	Rakes, Binoy, Mijink	Sanjarang Film Production
Maya (Bodo film)	2015	Bangchial	Uday Basumatary, Jonali Basumatary, Dwimasa Brahma		Hira Films
Roje Nwng	2015	Ganesh Boro	Simang Chainary, Sangina Brahma		
Sikhao	2015	V Ang Haa	Bhupen Rb, Eyerish		
Simang Badi	2015	Purnao Basumatary	Lingshar Basumatary, Somaina	Dhanukar Basumatary	Okhaphwr Film Production

== 2016 ==
Film	Release date	Director	Artists	Producer	Production
Ansula Afa	25 June	Rabi Narzary	Rabi Narzary, Esha Basumatary, Saya Basumatary	Rabi Narzary	RN Films
Ansuli Bima	2016	Bikram Basumatary	Hathorki, Divya, Bikram Basumatary, Padma, Jonali	MDK Mushahary	Harimu Film Production & Allied Co-Operative Society
Bathou Thandwi	2016	Pabindra Daimari	Nex Z Su, Ansumwi Boro	Lokeswar Basumatary	Jwogakhang Film Productions
Bimani Onnai	2016	Pradip Basumatary	Pradip Basumatary, Depa Wary		
Bisgwnang Onnai	2016	Swmdwn Boro	Dinesh Ramchiary, Manjurani Boro		JNBS Film Production
Burkai Haya	2016	Nerswn Mochahary	Uttam Basumatary, Jeni, Gitanjali	Uttam & Kachan	UK Films
Bodnam	16 November	Siboraj Narzary	Siboraj, Tarendra, Tunlai	Mosai, Dwithun, Danswrang	Dao Mwina Film Production
Daya Angni Nonga	2016	Mahesh Basumatary	Omprakash Kherkatary, Jirina Brahma, Jesus Kherkatary, Riju Brahma		
Gwswni Mijingk	2016		Peterson Brahma		
Gaonai Bikha		Prabin Goyary	Alongbar Goyary		
Haba: Bawswmnai	18 September	Rubul Boro	Dinesh Ramchiary, Leena	Ajay	
Hainamuli 6	2016	Jagat Boro	Jwngsrang Brahma, Dimasha Boro, Jagat Boro, Lipika Brahma, Helina Daimary, Taklai Narzary	Tarzan Basumatary	Bangbula Film Productions
Hathorki Pagla	17 November	Chiraj Baglary	Geolang Brahma, Somaina Basumatary, Riya Brahma		Raj Film Production Presents
Khwina	2016	Phaylaw Basumatary	Omprakash Kherkatary, Jirina Brahma, Jesus Kherkatary, Helina Daimary		
Khwisar 2	2016	R. Rwnao	R Rwnao, Indu Prabha		Qeerat Cine Production
Khwifwd	11 August	Mwktang Basumatary	Lingshar Basumatary, Jumu Rani Brahma	Pulish Wary	
Ma Daini Saja		Bigrai Brahma	Bigrai Brahma, Dolima Brahma		
Mwdwi	7 September	Michael Mushahary	Jwngsar Basumatary, Rinki Brahma	Arya	
Nepal To Bodoland	4 October	Swapan Kr. Brahma	Lingshar Basumatary, Ranjila Boro, Swapan Kumar Brahma, Jwngsrang Brahma, Taklai Narzary, Simanta Basumatary	Swapan Kumar Brahma	SKB Film Production
Nokhor Daoha	2016	Dinesh Kaman Prabin Basumatary	Birmal Mushahary, Junali Daimary, Rimal Basunatary, Pooja Mushahary		Prabha Rani Film Production
Once Upon a Time In Bodoland	2016	Arup Rava	Sansuma, Priyanka, Nagen		
Rega 1986	2016	Pankaj Lahary	Lingshar Basumatary, Lipika Brahma, Dwiringsha		Five Stars Films
Swithw Arw Fwthay	2016	Prabin Boro	Junali Daimary, Lipika Brahma		
Swmkhwr Simang	2016	Kamal KK	Omprakash Kherkatary, Jonali Basumatary, Karabi Basumatary	Leeladhar Narzary	

== 2017 ==
Film	Released date	Director	Artists	Producer	Production
Mr. Dugga Boro	2017	Michael Mushahary	Lingshar Basumatary, Juhi Narzary, Mosko Brahma, Taklai Narzary	Birphung Mohilary	BM Film Production
Simangni Howa Gwdan	10 May	Rabi Narzary	Rabi Narzary, Samaina, Pitheng Brahma	Rabi Narzary	RN Films
Aang Boro	23 Sept.2017	Swapan Kumar Brahma	Lingshar Basumatary, Swapan Kumar Brahma, Lipika Brahma, Sanjita Brahma	Swapan Kumar Brahma	SKB Film Production
Thangkhi Gwiywi Somaj	2017	Rabi Narzary	Rabi Narzary, Pampuli Goyary	Rabi Narzary	RN Films
Mr. Sanjary	2017	Probin Boro	Birmal Mushahary, Probin Boro, Junali Daimary		
Lwrgi Dinga	2017	Pangkaj Lahary	Lingshar Basumatary, Leena, Kamleswar, Rubul Boro		Five Stars Films
Jwhwlao: The Great	2017	R.R. Daimary	Raj Kochari, Mundina Brahma, Rubul	Raj Kochary	
Fwrmaiso Haywi Gwsw	2017	Ganesh Boro	Simang Chainary, Helina Daimary, Riya Brahma, Wingckel Brahma	Riya Brahma	RB Film Production
Gwrwnthiya Swrni?	2017	Peterson Brahma	Peterson Brahma, Jirina Brahma, Jonali Basumatary	Roje & Peterson	Aronai Film Society
Thaklai 2	2017	Thaklai Narzary	Swrang Narzary, Taklai, Jwngsrang, Dimasha		
Bodoland Fighter	2017	Guru Pabitra Boro	James Mushahary, Jwngsrang Brahma, Laxmi		Five Stars Films
Dagw	22-O9-2017	Pabindra Daimary	Nex Z Siu, Rinki Brahma		Jwogakhang Film Production Co-Operative Society
Lantha Police	2017	Phaylaw Basumatary	Dinesh Ramchiary, Alongbar Goyary, Jirina Brahma, Jesus Kherkatary		
Saya Maya Simang	2017	Gwjwn Boro	Bikram Basumatary		
Sirinai Bibarni Mwdwmnai	01-09-2017	Mwktang Basumatary	Mosko Brahma, Birsing Narzary, Nex Z Su, Ansumwi Boro		Jewari Film Production Pvt Ltd.
Alai arw Aron	2017	Probin Boro	Jonali Basumatary, Rimal Basunatary, Jennifer, Probin Boro		Prabha Rani Film Production
Ang Gonaya	2017	Tarendra Basumatary	Dhanukar, Siboraj, Tarendra, Sanjana, Ranjila, Mwnabili		Sindoor Film Production
Mitislabwi Annai Mwnna	2017	Janak Basumatary	John, Shanti, Raja, Manalisha		JBS Production
Bibayary	2017	Kamal KK	Mithinga Goyary, Riju		
Gamini Roje	2017	Kamal KK	Ringki Brahma		RM Films
Suthur	2017	Aman Boro	D Karna Basumatary, Pompi Daimari		Jwhwlao Film Production
Gun Gwnang Gunda	2017	Subarna Basumatary	Subarna, Rinki, Kusum, Manju Rani	Dwitun & Subungsar	Dwimu Nijira Film Production
Somni Fakhonao Thwini Bana	2017	Jihul Basumatary	Mrigoraj, Jumu Rani Brahma		SUNRISE Film Production
No 1 Fwthaikebso	2017	Subarna Basumatary	Subarna, Kusum		
Mwjang Mwnnaia Khana	2017	Swmdwn Boro	Omprakash Kherkatary, Swmaosar, Gemshree, Jil Mil	Karan Ramchiary	JBNS Film Production
Gwswa Maniya	2017	Chiraj Baglary	Geolang Brahma, Bobita, Gunboti		R.A.S Film Productions
Inai Udkhar	2017	Raj Kochary	Raj Kochary, Jonali Basumatary		B. Daogasar Film Production
Gwswni Rao	2017	Nerswn Mushahary	Uttam Basumatary, Ringki Brahma		

== 2018 ==
Films Name	Releasing Date	Director(s)	Cast	Producer	Production
Digital Wanted		Raj Kochary	Raj Kochary, Tarendra, Rubul		B. Daogasar Film Production
Dai	15 September 2018	Phungkha Basumatary	Phungkha, Sansuli	Phungkha Basumatary	PL2 Film Production
Gambari - The Untold Story		Prabin Boro	Birmal Mushahary, Mwkthang, Probin, Joyshree	Prabin Boro	PKMB Production
Hangma	10 September 2018	Prabin Boro	Mwkhthang, Joyshree, Prabin Boro,	Bhadra Basumatary	Jougafu Film Production
Udangsree		Guru Pabitra	James Mushahary, Uday, Leena, Gemsri Daimariy		NE Motion Picture Pvt. Ltd., Guru Audio visual Studio
Onnai		Raja Narzary	Lingshar Basumatary, Fuji Basumatary	Riya Brahma	RB FILM PRODUCTION
Bidai		Mwkthang Basumatary	Nerswn, Ansumwi, Taklai		Bibar Film Production
Paglee		Ganesh Boro	Sidharth Boro, Gemshree, Jennifer		R. Sona Production, GB Creations
Mwnfinnai Boraad		Pabindra Daimary	Karabi Basumatary, Nerswn Basumatary, Rupsing Machahary	Siba Ram Swargiary	JowgakhangFilm Production
Rebgon		Dhan Brahma	Swmdwn, Jennifer, Helina Daimary	Halbree Boro	DB Films
Silingkhar		Bhoda Kherkatary	Uttam Basumatary, Jumu Rani Brahma		Laimwn Pixels
Aijwni Ma Dai	12 September 2018	Siboraj Narzary	Siboraj Narzary, Mosco, Taklai,	Arabinda Narzary	Dao Mwina Film Production
Bithwn		Sachin Lahari	Biju (Mr. Dwijing), Rajorshi, Lipika Brahma		Swrang Multimedia Studio
Angkhow Langfwi Aywi	1 September 2018	Phaylaw Basumatary	Rajib, Rwisumwi, Phaylaw, Prabin Goyary	Sansree Basumatary	Dwimu Film Society
Lwgwri		R. Rwnao	Apon Daimary, Herock Ravio, Gemshree	Bapan Basumatary	Qeerat Cine Production
SWITHWNI FINNAI		Bijay Boro	Tularam, Derhasar, Pompi	Rinku Boro	Jaiklong Film Production
I Love You		Swapan Kr Brahma	Rajib, Nerswn, Jumu Rani Brahma, Lipika Brahma	Swapan Kr Brahma	SKB Film Production
Abir 2		Kamal KK	Mwkthang, Maidangsri, Rubul	Ranjit Goyary, Mithinga Dwimary	RM Film Production
Beer	15 September 2018	Pankaj Lahary	Swrang Narzary, Leena, Riju, Rubul	Pankaj Lahary	Five Stars Films & Two Brothers
Bima Bathul	9 September 2018	Subarna Basumatary	Abinash, Karishma, Rajorshi	Abinash	Bibar Film Society
Lady Tarzan	14 September 2018	Prabin Goyary	Alongbar Goyari, Priyanka, Manisha Goyary		Ganda Khungur Film Production
Nikhaori	September 2018	Prabin Basumatary	Rimal Basunatary, Mwkthang, Jwngsrang, Riju	Prabha Rani	Prabha Rani Film Production
Half Brain		Prabin Basumatary	Rimal, Mwkthang, Mithinga Narzary, Juhi, Jwngsrang, Dimasha, Bipul Rava		RM Film
Mwdwini Nijwra	October 2018	Kamleswar Basumatary	Uday, Leena, Rubul, Kamleswar	Babrubahan Boro	Hiramoni Rimjhim Production
Hayenni Boro		Tarendra Nath Basumatary	Sanjita, Tarendra, Dwimasa	Tarendra Nath Basumatary	Sindoor Film Production
Sonani Nokhor	10 September 2018	Rabi Narzary	Rabi Narzary, Esha Basumatary, Samaina Narzary	Rabi Narzary	
Maojini Adob 2		Michael Mushahary	Birphung Mohilary, Laisumwi, Swapan Kr, Dimasha, Taklai	Birphung Mohilary, Suraj Basumatary	BM Film Production
Nwngni Thakainw		Rojen Narzary	Bigrai, Somaina		BCPA
Songsharni Dahar	28 October	Bikram Basumatary	Hathorkhi Basumatary, Padmini Basumatary		Harimu Film Production & Allied Co-Operative Society

== 2019 ==
Films Name	Releasing Date	Director(s)	Cast	Producer	Production
Gwthar	8 November	Raja Narzary	Lingshar Basumatary, Pooja Mushahary, Leena, Rajarshi	Riya Brahma	RB Film Production
Ganja Fagla		Pankaj Lahary	Swrang Nazary, Helina Daimary, Hirok Rabha	Pankaj Lahary	Two Brothers Entertainment, Dhiraj Production
Gamiyari Sikhwla					
Godai		Probin Goyary	Alongbar Goyary, Junali Daimary		
Gwrbwni Mwdwi		Kamaleswar Basumatary	Uday, Leena, Rubul, Bishal, Manjurani	Babrubahan Boro Iswary	Hiramani Rimjim Film Production
Gwthwi Soho - An amazing love story		Santosh Basumatary	Mwkthang, Ansumwi Boro	Sangita Basumatary	Sonani Gorai Film Production
Hainamuli 7		Jogot Boro	Dwimasa Boro, Jwngsrang Brahma, Jagat Boro, Leena Basumatary, Karishma Boro		Bangbula Film Productions
Jengshi	12 September	Dipak Kr Ramchiary	Alongbar Goyary, Laisumwi Brahma		Simang Film Production
Jwlwi: The Seed	15 November	Rajni Basumatary	Rajni Basumatary, Shimang Chainary, Jayanta Narzary, Queen Hazarika, Pansy Brahma	Rajni Basumatary, Jani Viswanath	Manna Films
Lwkhisara Jaoyaisw		Siboraj Narzary	Siboraj, Shilka, Mosko	Siboraj Narzary	Dao Mwina Film Production
Orkhi		Raju Boro	Biju, Manisha	Rakesh Narzary, Raju Boro	Red Card Pictures
Randini Mwdwi		Mwkthang Basumatary	Rajib, Pampuli, Ansumwi Boro	Mwkthang Basumatary	Geremsa Studios
Sinaithi	15 September	Phungbili	Ron, Fuji Basumatary	Ansuma Basumatary, Daniel Swargiary	Dark House Media Production
Fwrman		Prabin Boro	Mwkthang Basumatary, Juhi Narzary	Swmdwn Narzary	NF Studio
Jiudaori		Razeef Rwnao	Mithinga Narzary, Jechonia Daimary	Razeef Rwnao	Qeerat Cine Production
Swlw - The Real Game		Dhiraj Boro	Mrigoraj Brahma, Priya Boro, Rupsing Machahary, Priyanka Boro	Bhabani boro, Dhiraj Boro	D Viewfinder Film Production
Gwsw	6 Sept.	Mzjing Narzary	Kusum, Sansuli, Tarendra, Sanasri	Tarendra Nath Brahma	SINDUR FILM PRODUCTION
Thainwi Megon		Anjan	Uttam Basumatary, Karishma, Rubul	Gendra	ABIR Family Cine Production
Sanso Haywi		Gani Vai Kachary	Gani Vai Kachary, Mithinga Narzary	Bhupan Boro	Red Film Production

== 2020 ==
Films	Release date	Director(s)	Casts	Producer(s)	Production
Bekar Romeo	28 January	M Okhrang Boro	M Okhrang Boro, Rubul Boro	Kabita Ramchiary	M Okhrang Production
Nongkhai Radai		BIjay, Micheal	Mithinga Narzary, Nilosa, Ansumwi		SCS Film Production
Riminla Songsar		Prabin Basumatary	Danswrang, Binu, Rakesh	Rakesh Narzary	RS Films Production
Hangar		Raj Kochary	Raj Kochary, Rubul		B. Daogasar Film Production
Feleng Nwjwr		Subarna Basumatary	Mithuram, Subarna, Rajarshi, Abinash, Anil Kr Narzary		Bibar Film Production
Mijing	December	Prabin Basumatary	Krishna, Juli		Prabha Rani Film Production
Aalashi		Santosh Basumatary	Nijwm, Anamika		Sonani Gorai Film Production

== 2021 ==
Films	Release date	Director(s)	Casts	Producer(s)	Production
Bishombi	1 October 2021	Pankaj Lahary	Alari Swargiary, Swrang Narzary, Swrang Basumatary, Leena Basumatary	Pankaj Lahary	Dhiraj Production
Okhrang Ni Hathorkhi	9 October 2021	Prabin Boro	Nerswn Basumatary, Leena Basumatary	Birphung Boro	Jambi Film Production
Khamglinai Gwswni Mwdwi		Subarna Basumatary	Mithuram, Leena, Subarna, Junali	Mithuram Brahma	MB Film Production
Aronai		Prabin Boro	Mwkthang, Birmal Mushahary, Junali Daimary, Prabin Boro		
Angnw Nangow			Alongbar Goyary, Rinki Brahma		

== 2022 ==
Films	Director (s)	Casts	Producer(s)	Production
Gwdan Radai	Swapan Kr Brahma	ATG, Jennifer, Ansumwi	ATG	Sona Films Production
Dakha Jwmwi	Pankaj Lahary	Lingshar, Monalisa, Bigrai		2 Brothers, MN Production
Thulunga	Ganesh Boro	Shimang Chainary, Priangka		NB Production
Twiblabw Jena	Birphung Mohilary	Rajib, Birphung	Birphung Mohilary	BM Film Production
Agor Gwiywi Aronai	Prabin Boro	Swrang, Mwkhthang, Birmal Mushahary	Anjalu Basumatary	AR Film Production
Duplicate Police	Subarna Basumatary	Subarna Basumatary, Alari Swargiary, Mosco, Rajorshi	Nijwm Basumatary	NB Film Production
Raha	Dasarath Boro	Uttam Basumatary, Mithinga Narzary		Hira Production
Saikong	Jesus Kherkatary	Omprakash, Helina Daimary		Jambi Film Production
Aronbarini Jwhwlaojw	Bipul Basumatary			AG Comedy Kings
Jwnwm Jwnwm	Santosh Basumatary	Rajib, Kamaleswar		
Twiso Thangso	Prabin Goyary	Alongbar Goyary, Nerswn, Puja		Alongbar Production
Jaolia	Nerswn Mushahary	Uttam Basumatary, Swapna	Ratul Goyary	
Onthai Bikha	Dilip Swargiary	Mithisar, Dwimu, Redhikha, Dilip, Krishno		DS Film Production
Jowmwn	Swmdwn Boro	Swmdwn, Ansumwi	Swmdwn	
Lapa Duga	Mizing Narzary	Mizing Narzary, Jowyen		
Jiuao Hangma	Ganesh Baro	Shimang Chainary, Priangka		Hangma Film Production
Sikhwla Bilathi	Subarna Basumatary	Emanuel, Subarna, Oollee		Jaiklong Film Production

== 2023 ==
Film	Director(s)	Casts	Producer(s)	Production
the BORO (Documentary Series)	Anamika Basumatary Nishant Balgovind	Hagrama Mohilary, Ranjan Daimary, Pramod Boro Pramila Rani Brahma, Srinivas Kumar Sinha, Subramanian Swamy Mangal Singh Hazowary Hebebala Basumatary(Bhumka) Prafulla Kumar Mahanta	Binay Basumatary Jayanti Basumatary Anamika Basumatary Amit Kumar Ritesh Kumar	BG Productions Mumbai

== See also ==
- Bodo culture
