= Salakati =

- city
- Location in Assam, India Salakati (India)
- Coordinates: 26.493313°N 90.362549°E
- Country: India
- State: Assam
- District: Kokrajhar

Population (2001)
  - Total: 6,772

Languages
  - Official: Assamese
- Time zone: UTC+5:30 (IST)
- Postal code: 783369
- ISO 3166 code: IN-AS
- Vehicle registration: AS

Salakati, is a census town in Kokrajhar district in the Indian state of Assam. Salakati is 14km away in the north east direction from Kokrajhar.The town has a railway junction.

== Demographics ==
As of 2001 India census, Salakati had a population of 6772. Males constitute 55% of the population and females 45%. Salakati has an average literacy rate of 66%, higher than the national average of 59.5%: male literacy is 74%, and female literacy is 56%. In Salakati, 13% of the population is under 6 years of age.

== Transport ==
Salakati Railway Station serves the town of Salakati, Kokrajhar district, Assam. This railway station lies under Alipurduar railway division of Northeast Frontier Railway Zone.

== Others ==
State Bank of India has a branch at Salakati. NTPC Limited has a Thermal Power Project at Salakati known as NTPC Bongaigaon. LPG DISTRIBUTOR M/S Adarsh Indane Gramin Vitrak. Assam Garmin Vikash Bank has a branch at Salakati Bazar.
