= Commerce College =

Commerce College may refer to:

== Bangladesh ==
- Dhaka Commerce College, a master's level college in Mirpur, Dhaka, Bangladesh
- Chittagong Commerce College, a government college in Agrabad, Chittagong, Bangladesh
- Azam Khan Commerce College, the first Commerce college in Bangladesh

== India ==
- Commerce College, Jaipur, a college in Rajasthan, India
- Commerce College Ground, a cricket ground in Ahmedabad, India
- Goenka College of Commerce and Business Administration, a premiere commerce college of India

== Kokrajhar ==
- Commerce College, Kokrajhar, a college for commerce in Kokrajhar
