= Alayaron =

1986 Bodo language

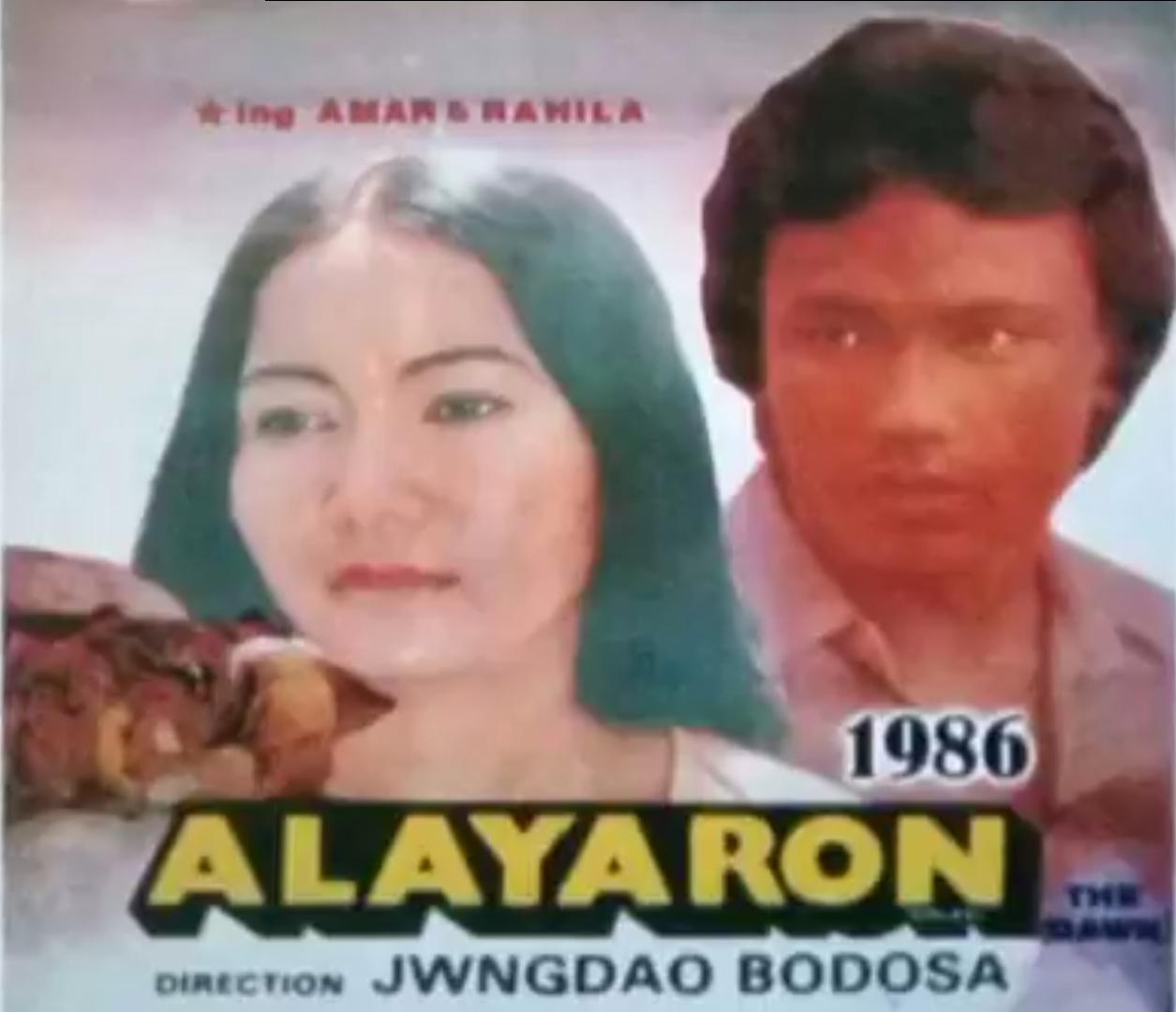
- Bodo: आलायारन
- Directed by: Jwngdao Bodosa
- Screenplay by: Nilkamal Brahma; Heramba Narzary
- Based on: "Mwdwi Arw Gwlwmdwi" by Nilkamal Brahma
- Produced by: Bodosa Film Productions
- Starring: Amar Narzary; Rohila Brahma; Tikendrajit Narzary
- Cinematography: Jwngdao Bodosa
- Edited by: Jwngdao Bodosa
- Music by: Mahini Narzary
- Release date: 13 March 1986
- Country: India
- Language: Bodo

Alayaron (English:The Dawn) is one of the first Bodo language feature movies. It was released on 13 March 1986 at Ganga Talkies, Kokrajhar. The film was directed by Jwngdao Bodosa from a screenplay by Nilkamal Brahma and Hiramba Narzary. The story is based upon the short story Mwdwi Arw Gwlwmdwi, which was published Sirinai Mandar in 1985 written by Brahma himself. The movie stars Amar Narzary and Rohila Brahma in leading roles.

The film garnered the 33rd National Film Awards in 1986, for Best Feature Film in Bodo.

== See also ==
- Bodo films
- Bodo language
