= Dotma =

- City
- Interactive map of Dotma
- Country: India
- State: Assam
- District: Kokrajhar

Population (2011)
  - Total: 144,393

Languages
  - Official: Bodo
- Time zone: UTC+5:30 (IST)
- PIN: 783347
- Telephone code: 03661
- Vehicle registration: AS

Dotma is a town within the District of Kokrajhar is the state of Assam, North-east India. It is one of the Revenue circles and developmental blocks in the Kokrajhar district. This town also known as Dotoma.

== History ==
At close of the Bhutan War of 1864, the British and the Bhutani signed the Sinchula Agreement in 1865. Under the agreement, the 18th Bhutan Duars were divided into the Eastern and Western Duars. The portion of the land lying between the Manas and Sankosh rivers was formed into the Eastern Duars district and was administered by Deputy Commissioner with headquarter at Dotma.

By the government notification of 3 December 1866, the Eastern Duars were added to Goalpara and along with this Goalpara was separated from province of Assam and placed under the Commissioner at Coochbehar division in all matters.

Due to administrative convenience the civil and criminal jurisdiction of Goalpara was re-transferred to Judicial Commissioner of Assam on 10 August 1868, but executive control remained with the commissioner of Coochbehar. Goalpara along with Dotma was finally incorporated in the new province when Assam was created as a separate administration in 1874. The Headquarters of the District initially located at Goalpara was transferred to Dhubri in 1879.

In the 19th century the British accepted it as a commercial place and constructed a narrow gauge railway in the heart of Dotma to reach Kochugaon, for carrying timber logs from the Kochugaon Forest division. These timber logs had been placed at Dotma at Thulungapuri the burial ground of Upendra Nath Brahma, father of the Bodo people, from which these were dispatched to Fakiragram for selling.

Besides there was a legendary hero called Jaolia Dewan or Sikna Mech. When a war took place between the British force and Bhutias, Sikna Mech sided with the Bhutani force. He left his capital Siknajhar and sheltered at the Dangarkuti village of Dotma, hiding his pregnant wife in neighbouring Bhalukmari village. He was defeated by the British who had the use of cannons. Later he was killed by the British force at Ali Khungri river in Bengal.

== Public services ==
=== Police and security ===
- Dotma Police Station
- Central Reserve Police Force

== Recreation ==
=== Parks ===
- Thulungapuri

== Education ==
=== Secondary schools ===
- De Paul's Public School, Dotma
- St. Francis Xavier School
- Dotma Girls' High School
- Dotma Higher Secondary School
- Dotma JB School
- U.N. Academy
- Gurudev Kalicharan Brahma Academy

=== Universities and colleges ===
- Bodofa U.N. Brahma College

== Sports ==
=== Stadiums ===
- DASA Field

=== Teams ===
==== Football ====
- Dotma DASA XI

=== Tournaments ===
==== Football ====
- Daoharu Mungklong Trophy
- Dotma Village Tournament
- Dotma School Tournament

== See also ==
- Thulungapuri
