= Bongaigaon Thermal Power Station =

Power plant under construction in Assam, India

- Official name: Bongaigaon Thermal Power Station
- Country: India
- Location: Salakati near Bongaigaon Kokrajhar, BTAD, Kokrajhar district, Assam
- Coordinates: 26°26′26″N 90°21′43″E
- Status: Operational
- Commission date: 2015
- Operator: NTPC

Thermal power station
- Primary fuel: Coal

Power generation
- Nameplate capacity: 750 MW

External links
- Website: www.ntpc.co.in

Bongaigaon Thermal Power Station is an under construction power project located at Salakati near Bongaigaon in Kokrajhar district in Indian state of Assam. The power plant is one of the coal based power plants of NTPC.

The coal for the plant will be derived from Makum coal mines at Margherita, Assam and also from Eastern Coalfields Limited (ECL).

== History ==
Kokrajhar Thermal Power Station is a coal based power plant situated in Salakati in the district of Kokrajhar in Assam. It consists of three coal-fired units of 250MW each. These units came into operation during the year 1981 to 1986 in two stages. In the first stage, two units (Unit I & II) were commissioned in 1981 and 1982 respectively. In the second stage, two units (Unit-III & IV) were commissioned in 1985 and 1986 respectively.

Major equipment like boiler, turbine, auxiliaries like BFP, CEP, PA fans, bowl mills etc. were supplied by BHEL. In coal handling plant, major equipment like primary and secondary crusher were supplied by TRF and wagon tippler was supplied by Heavy Engineering Corporation (HEC). Since commissioning none of the units could deliver the desired level of generation for various reasons. Some of the main reasons were problems in the boiler, turbine, mill and other unit auxiliaries and also in the coal handling plant. During July 2002, the plant was running at a very low PLF of 4.6%, very high auxiliary power consumption of 22.68% very high specific oil consumption of 59.12 ml/kwhr and height specific coal consumption of 0.85 kg/kwhr with a coal of GCV 3500 Kcal/kg. None of the units could deliver the required level of generation and the maximum PLF of the plant in the last twenty years of operation has been only 24.23%. As a result, the station had to be shut down. It had been found that although it was technically feasible to renovate the existing units of NTPC, Salakati, it would not have been economically viable as the tariff works out to about Rs 3.16 per unit after carrying out R&M at an estimated cost of about Rs 7 billion. Hence, capital grant/viability gap funding of Rs 3.5 billion would have to be provided to bring down the tariff to an acceptable level of Rs 2.50 per unit. The alternative is NTPC's proposal to set up a new 750 MW (3 X 250 MW) Thermal Power Station at the same location, at a total project cost of approximately Rs Rs 44.9624 billion based on third quarter 2006 price level. The power station would be based on Fuel Gas Desulphurization (FGD) technology due to high sulphur content of Assam coal, involving an additional cost of Rs 0.5 crores/MW approximately.

== Capacity ==
Its planned capacity of 750 MW (3x250 MW).

Unit Number	Capacity (MW)	Date of Commissioning	Status
1	250	2015 June	commissioned.
2	250	2017 March	commissioned.
3	250	2019 March	commissioned.
TOTAL	750		
