= Salakati railway station =

Railway station in Assam, India

Salakati

General information
- Location: National Highway 31C, PIN - 783376, Dist - Kokrajhar (B.T.A.D.) State: Assam; India
- Coordinates: 26.493313°N 90.362549°E
- Elevation: 49 metres (161 ft)
- System: Indian Railways Station
- Owner: Indian Railways
- Operator: Northeast Frontier Railway zone
- Lines: Barauni–Guwahati line, New Jalpaiguri–New Bongaigaon section
- Platforms: 2
- Tracks: 3 (broad gauge)

Construction
- Structure type: At grade
- Parking: Available

Other information
- Status: Functioning
- Station code: SLKX
- Zone(s): Northeast Frontier Railway zone
- Division(s): Alipurduar

History
- Electrified: Under Process
Location
- Location within Assam Location within India

Salakati railway station serves the town of Salakati, Kokrajhar district in the Indian state of Assam. The station code is SLKX and lies on the New Jalpaiguri–New Bongaigaon section of Barauni–Guwahati line under Northeast Frontier Railway. This station falls under Alipurduar railway division.
