= Thulungapuri =

Thulungapuri is a memorial in Dotma, Kokrajhar district, Assam, India, dedicated to Bodofa Upendranath Brahma. Bodofa died on 1 May 1990 in Mumbai and was buried on Dotma which is now known as Thulungapuri.
