= Kameshwar Brahma =

Padma Shri winning writer and social activist

Kameshwar brahma
- Born: 1 September 1940 (age 85); Assam, India
- Occupations: Writer and social activist
- Known for: Works in literature
- Awards: Padma Shri

Kameshwar Barma is a Padma Shri awarded person. Born on 1 September 1940 in the Kokrajhar district of the NorthEast Indian state of Assam, he is reported to have contributed to the development of Bodo language through his writings and activities. He was also involved with different NGOs and the goodwill activities of different tribal peoples. The government Of India awards him the Padma Shri, the fourth highest civilian award of the country. He served at different positions .

He was awarded the 2020 Sahitya Akademi Translation Prize for his translation Gibi Bharatni Jerimin.

== See also ==
- Bodo Sahitya Sabha
- Bineswar Brahma
