= Raimona National Park =

National park in Assam

- IUCN category II (national park)
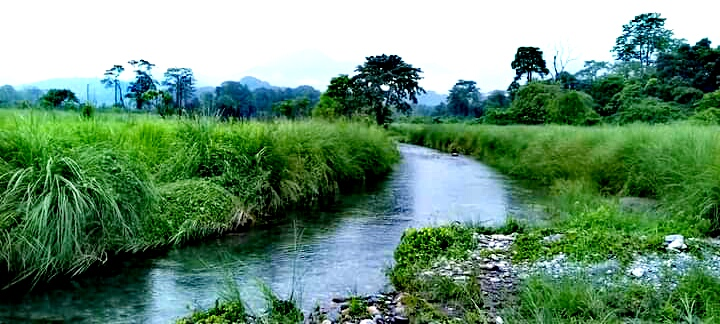
- Western parts of Raimona National Park

- Location within Assam Location within India
- Interactive map of Raimona National Park
- Location: Gossaigaon, Kokrajhar District, Assam
- Nearest city: Gossaigaon
- Coordinates: 26.65972°N 89.97611°E
- Area: 422 km^{2} (163 sq mi)
- Created: 9 June 2021
- Governing body: Government of Assam

Raimona National Park is located in extreme western part of Assam, India. It is spread across Gossaigaon and Kokrajhar subdivisions of Kokrajhar district of Bodoland Territorial Region.

== History ==
Raimona National Park was initially recommended as Ripu-Chirang Wildlife Sanctuary being part of Ripu Reserved Forest and Chirang Reserved Forest being adjacent a part of it was also mooted to be within. Those were made owing to its significance for conservation of the Asian elephant, gaur and golden langur, all of which have large populations in the area.

== Geography ==
Raimona National Park forms a transboundary contiguous forest patch with Bhutan's Phibsoo Wildlife Sanctuary and Jigme Singye Wangchuck National Park. Both form part of Indo-Bhutan Transboundary Conservation Area and have been recognised by both national governments in 2010. It also serves as buffer to Manas National Park and Buxa Tiger Reserve.

== Biodiversity ==
=== Flora ===
Raimona National Park harbours 380 varieties of plants and orchids.

=== Fauna ===
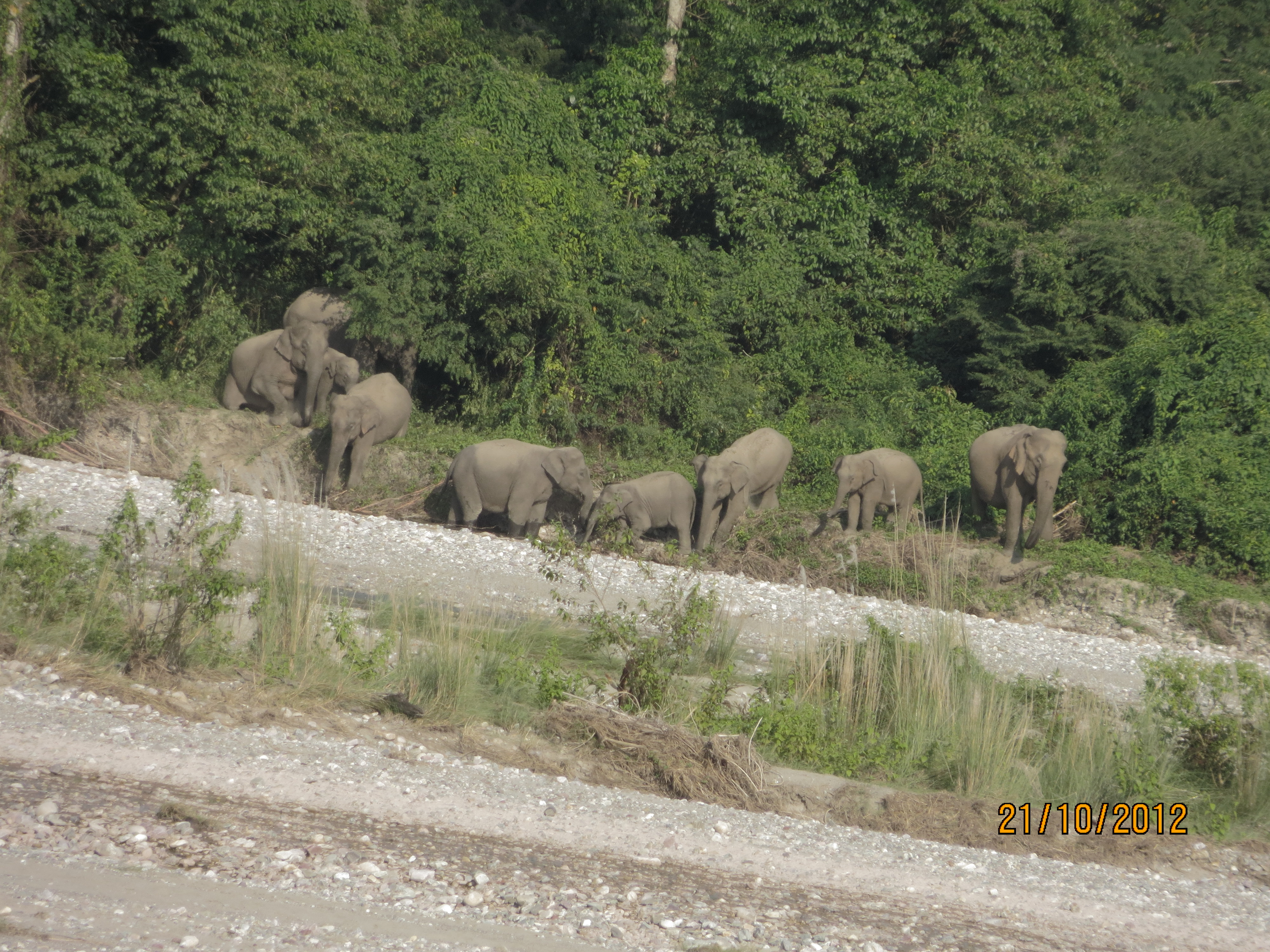
Wild elephant

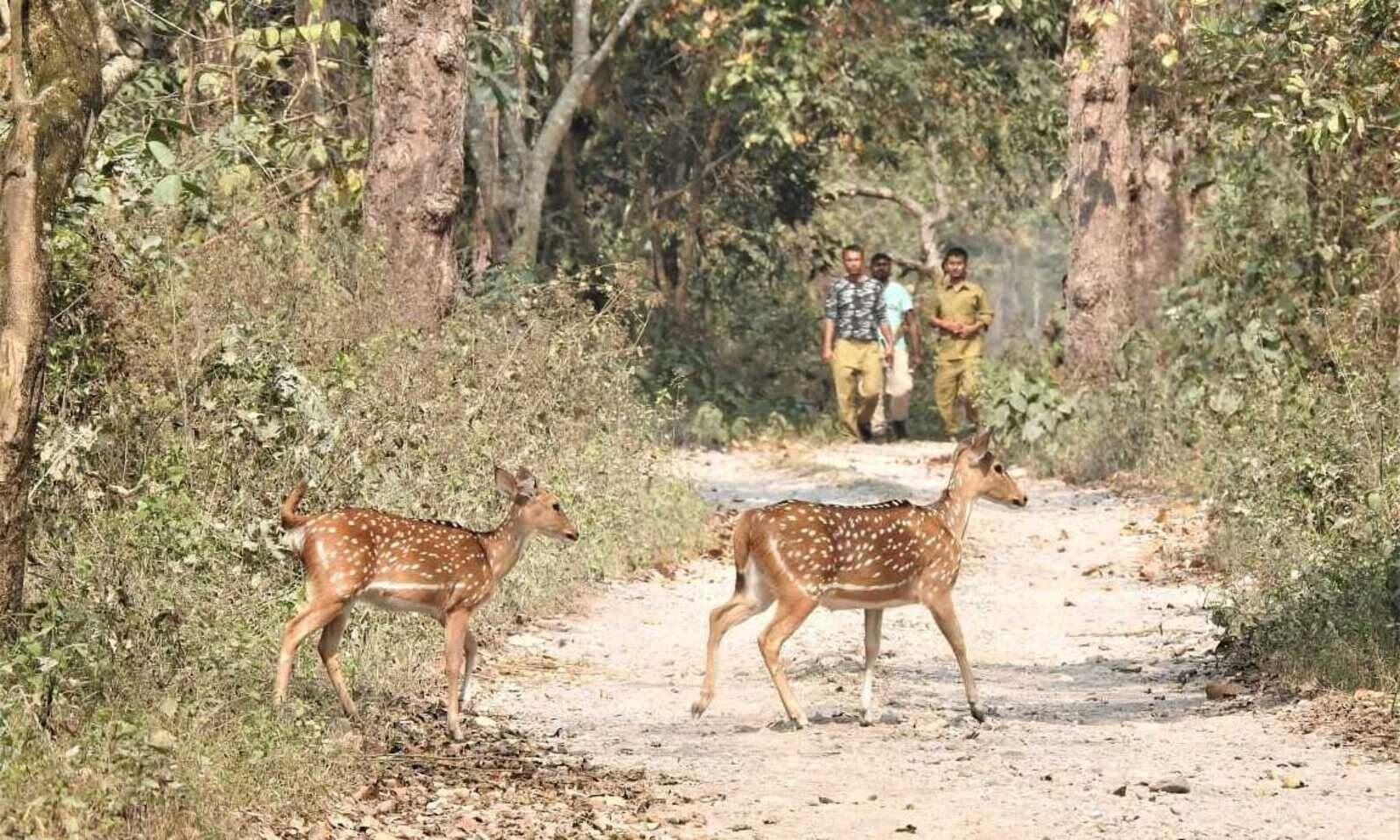
Spotted deer

Raimona National Park is home to slow loris, Assamese macaque, Rhesus monkey and golden langur. It also harbours Chinese pangolin, dhole, Himalayan black bear, crab-eating mongoose, jungle cat, leopard cat, Asian golden cat, Bengal tiger, leopard, clouded leopard, Asian elephant, gaur, Himalayan serow, sambar, chital, hog deer, barking deer, Himalayan porcupine and hispid hare.

=== Avifauna ===
Raimona National Park is an important bird and biodiversity area. Avifauna includes white-bellied heron, swamp francolin, pheasant, grey peacock pheasant, Indian peafowl, Oriental darter, lesser adjutant, collared falconet, slender-billed vulture, white-backed vulture, besra, black baza, Jerdon's baza, osprey, Bengal florican, now perhaps extirpated, ibisbill, green imperial pigeon, mountain imperial pigeon, red-breasted parakeet, great pied hornbill, occasional rufous-necked and Indian grey hornbills, wreathed hornbill, hill myna and scaly thrush.
