= Daina (film) =

- Bodo: दायना
- Directed by: Amar Hazarika
- Produced by: Bodo Film Society
- Starring: Ghana Kanta Basumatary; Prosenjit Brahma; Anjali Brahma
- Music by: Bhupen Hazarika
- Release date: 9 September 1984
- Running time: 45 minutes
- Country: India
- Language: Bodo

Daina is a 1984 Indian Bodo documentary film directed by Amar Hazarika, starring Ghana Kanta Basumatary as leading actor. Prosenjit Brahma, Arup Gwra Basumatary, Shitala Brahma and Anjali Brahma play in the supporting roles. The film was produced by Bodo Film Society from Kokrajhar district. It was released on 9 September 1984. The music for the film is composed by Dr. Bhupen Hazarika.

== Synopsis ==
The film covers the practice of witchcraft amongst villagers.

== Production ==
The film was set in the Kokrajhar district and was the first Bodo documentary film produced by Bodo Film Society.

== See also ==
- Bodo films
