= Dau Huduni Methai =

- Dau Huduni Methai Theatrical Release Poster
- Directed by: Manju Borah
- Screenplay by: Manju Borah
- Based on: Dao Hudur Gaan by Rashmirekha Bora
- Produced by: Shankar Lall Goenka
- Starring: Reshma Mushahary; Ahalya Daimary; Nita Basumatary
- Cinematography: Sudheer Palsane
- Edited by: A. Sreekar Prasad
- Music by: Aniruddha Borah
- Production company: Shiven Arts
- Release dates: 1 September 2015 (MWFF); 30 December 2016 (Assam)
- Running time: 78 minutes
- Country: India
- Language: Bodo

Dau Huduni Methai (English: Song of the Horned Owl) is a 2015 Bodo language drama film directed by Manju Borah; based on the Assamese novel Dao Hudur Gaan written by Rashmirekha Bora and adapted as screenplay by the director herself. It was produced by Shankar Lall Goenka and stars Reshma Mushahary, Ahalya Daimary, and Nita Basumatary in the lead roles. The film was premiered at Montreal World Film Festival on 1 and 2 September 2015.

Dau Huduni Methai recounts the effects of insurgency and counterinsurgency on common people through the perspective of a young rape victim.

== Plot ==
According to a myth in Bodo community, exploited man after death transforms into a horned owl (Hudu) and comes back to his/her home and keeps calling from a tree. The film takes this myth and uses it as a metaphor to intensify the thematic development.

The film explores the social and political upheavals of the indigenous Bodo community post the Second World War. Close to 40,000 people have lost their lives to communal violence and insurgency over the past 35 years in the northeast regions of India, many of the victims entirely innocent bystanders. Raimali (Reshma Mushahary), a young rape victim, knows this firsthand. As she lies in an abandoned house, she recalls how separatist violence has marked her life, that of her lover and their families, contrasting its disruption with indigenous folklore and the immutability of the Assamese landscape.

== Cast ==
- Reshma Mushahary as Raimali
  - Jasmine Hazowary as young Raimali
- Ahalya Daimary as Raimali's grandmother
- Nita Basumatary as Raimali's mother
- Ajay Kumar Boro as Raimali's father
- Tony Basumatary as Sunswrang
- Onjali Bodosa as Mainao
- Thamfwi Danga Basumatary as Paniram

== Production ==
Director Manju Borah had planned this film a couple of years ago, however she could not start work on it as she did not find an artiste suitable for the role of the protagonist. Later she cast Reshma Mushahary for the role and started filming in late 2014 in nearby locations of Boko and Dhupdhor of Assam, and other locations of Meghalaya-Assam border for about 22 days. The crew faced security issues while filming and had to finish the work quickly.

The story of the film was based on the novel Dao Hudur Gaan written by Rashmirekha Bora which was published in 2009 in the monthly magazine Bhumi.

== Release ==
The film was premiered at Montreal World Film Festival on 1 and 2 September 2015 in Focus on World Cinema section. Later screened at Jagaran Film Festival, 17th Mumbai Film Festival in India Gold section, All Lights India International Film Festival, and 20th International Film Festival of Kerala. The film was also selected for Indian Panorama at 46th International Film Festival of India.

Director Borah in an interview said that probably the film will not have a theatrical release. She added, "With most theatres favouring mainstream cinema and even audiences, it’s impossible for films from other languages to make it to cinemas." Later the film had a limited theatrical release in Assam on 30 December 2016.

== See also ==
- Alayaron
