= Dainuvīte =

- Gender: Female
- Name day: December 26

Origin
- Region of origin: Latvia

Other names
- Related names: Daina

Dainuvīte is a Latvian feminine given name. The associated name day is December 26.
