= Commerce College, Kokrajhar =

College in Assam, India

- Motto: Discipline & Knowledge
- Type: College
- Established: 17 March 1985
- Affiliations: Bodoland University
- Principal: Dr Ratneswar Debnath
- Location: Kokrajhar, Kokrajhar district, BTR, Assam, India
- Campus: Urban
- Website: commercecollege.ac.in

Commerce College, Kokrajhar is a college for commerce in Kokrajhar, established on 17 March 1985 through a resolution adopted in a public meeting held at Pragati Bhawan, Kokrajhar.

== Departments ==
The college have the following departments:

- Higher Secondary two-year course in Commerce & Arts under Assam Higher Secondary Education Council
- B.Com. (Three Year Degree Course in 1 +1 +1 Pattern) under Gauhati University.
- Short-term Professional Certificate & Diploma Courses.
- Bachelor of Business Administration (BBA) - Three year degree course under Gauhati University.
- And in 2017 M.com have also been included in this institute .(1+1)

== Facilities ==
=== College Library and Reading Room ===
Students may borrow books from the library against the Library Cards. They may read various newspapers and journals in the reading room of the library.

There is a book bank facility meant for the poor and needy students.

=== Parking ===
There is a parking shed for vehicles and Bicycles in the College.

=== Auditorium ===
The college has an auditorium with the sitting capacity of 500.

== Reservation of seats ==
Reservation policy of the Government of India is strictly maintained during admission.

Two seats each are reserved in various courses for students distinguishing in sports and culture. One seat each is reserved for applicants of the NCC and Scouts & Guides.
