= Majendra Narzary =

Indian politician (1953–2021)

Member of Assam Legislative Assembly
- In office 11 May 2006 – 26 May 2021
- Preceded by: Mithius Tudu
- Succeeded by: Jiron Basumatary
- Constituency: Gossaigaon

Personal details
- Born: 15 May 1953 Gossaigaon, Assam, India
- Died: 26 May 2021 (aged 68) Guwahati, Assam, India
- Party: Bodoland People's Front
- Spouse: Mrs. Niri Narzary (m. 1975)
- Education: St. Anthony's College, Shillong (BA)

Majendra Narzary (15 May 1953 – 26 May 2021) was a Bodoland People's Front politician from Assam, India.

== Biography ==
He was elected in the Assam Legislative Assembly election from 2006 from Gossaigaon constituency.
