= Dholmara =

Village in Assam, India

Coordinates: 21°14′N 79°30′E

Dholmara is a small village of Kokrajhar District, Assam, India. The place is well known for golden langur monkeys.
