= Gossaigaon Assembly constituency =

Assembly constituency of Assam

Gossaigaon
- Constituency No. 1 for the Assam Legislative Assembly

Constituency details
- Country: India
- Region: Northeast India
- State: Assam
- Division: Lower Assam
- District: Kokrajhar
- Lok Sabha constituency: Kokrajhar
- Established: 1951
- Reservation: None

Member of Legislative Assembly
- 16th Assam Legislative Assembly
- Incumbent Sabharam Basumatary
- Party: BPF
- Alliance: NDA
- Elected year: 2026
- Preceded by: Jiron Basumatary

Gossaigaon is one of the 126 constituencies of the Assam Legislative Assembly in India. Gossaigaon is part of the Kokrajhar Lok Sabha constituency.

== Extent ==
After 2023, Gossaigaon Assembly constituency is made up Gossaigaon Town Committee, and parts of Gossaigaon, Hatidhura and Kachugaon Development Blocks.

== Members of the Legislative Assembly ==
Election	Name	Party
1952	Jatindra Narayan Das	Indian National Congress
1957	Mithius Tudu	Independent politician
1962	Mithius Tudu	Independent politician
1967	Mithius Tudu	Independent politician
1972	Mithius Tudu	Indian National Congress
1978	Mithius Tudu	Indian National Congress
1983	Mithius Tudu	Indian National Congress
1985	Mithius Tudu	Indian National Congress
1991	Tajendra Narzary	Independent politician
1996	Tajendra Narzary	Asom Gana Parishad
2001	Mithius Tudu	Indian National Congress
2006	Majendra Narzary	Independent politician
2011	Majendra Narzary	Bodoland People's Front
2016	Majendra Narzary	Bodoland People's Front
2021	Majendra Narzary	Bodoland People's Front
2021^	Jiron Basumatary	United People's Party Liberal
2026	Sabharam Basumatary	Bodoland People's Front

^ bypoll

== Election results ==
=== 2026 ===
2026 Assam Legislative Assembly election: Gossaigaon
Party	Candidate	Votes	%	±%
BPF	Sabharam Basumatary	44,394	44.35	+30.57
JMM	Phendricson Hansdak	21,417	21.40	New
UPPL	Aninda Basumatary	17,431	17.41	−22.23
INC	Joseph Hasda	15,128	15.11	−5.47
Independent	Helen Murmu	600	0.60	N/A
NOTA	NOTA	1,123	1.12	+0.20
Margin of victory		22,977	21.95	+2.89
Turnout		1,00,093	87.42	+9.72
Rejected ballots				
Registered electors		1,14,486		
BPF gain from UPPL		Swing		

=== 2021 bypoll ===
2021 Assam Legislative Assembly By-Election: Gossaigaon
Party	Candidate	Votes	%	±%
UPPL	Jiron Basumatary	58,769	39.64	+1.09
INC	Jowel Tudu	30,517	20.58	−2.00
BPF	Dhruba Kumar Brahma Narzary	20,435	13.78	−31.41
AIUDF	Khairul Anam Khandakar	19,255	12.99	New
Independent	Osman Goni Sheikh	14,334	9.67	New
Independent	Kamal Roy	1,478	1	New
None of the Above	None of the Above	1,369	0.92	
Majority		28,252	19.06	+12.35
Turnout		1,48,274	77.70	
UPPL gain from BPF		Swing		

=== 2021 ===
2021 Assam Legislative Assembly election: Gossaigaon
Party	Candidate	Votes	%	±%
BPF	Majendra Narzary	70,407	45.19	+13.26
UPPL	Somnath Narzary	60,064	38.55	New
IND	Khairul Anam Khandakar	9,174	5.89	New
IND	Surjyanath Tudu	3,982	2.56	New
IND	Abdul Samad Choudhury	3,831	2.46	New
Majority		10,343	6.71	+2.47
Turnout		1,59,239	84.03	−1.80
BPF hold		Swing		

=== 2016 ===
2016 Assam Legislative Assembly election: Gossaigaon
Party	Candidate	Votes	%	±%
BPF	Majendra Narzary	45,517	31.93	
AIUDF	Ravi Sankar Kasireddy	39,476	27.69	
INC	Ashim Hasda	32,187	22.58	
IND	Somnath Narzary	17,924	12.57	
IND	Wilson Hasda	3,786	2.66	
RPI(A)	Mithun Nath	1,199	0.85	
IND	Rajendra Mushahary	969	0.69	
NOTA	None of the above	1,482		
Majority		6,041	4.24	
Turnout		1,41,058	84.9	
BPF hold		Swing		

=== 2011 ===
2011 Assam Legislative Assembly election: Gossaigaon
Party	Candidate	Votes	%	±%
BPF	Majendra Narzary	47,543	36.20	
AIUDF	Khairul Alam Miah	26,598	20.25	
IND	Ashim Hasda	21,355	16.26	
INC	Chrisostom Tudu	17,298	13.17	
IND	Rajendra Mushahary	7,613	5.80	
BJP	Santosh Tarafdar	5,444	4.15	
IND	Nibaran Basumatary	2,577	1.96	
JMM	Junash Murmu	1,594	1.21	
AITC	Somari Basumatary	1,304	0.99	
Majority		20,945	15.9	
Turnout		1,31,325	82.1	
BPF hold		Swing		
