= Hagramayao Jinahari =

- Directed by: Jwngdao Bodosa
- Story by: Jwngdao Bodosa
- Produced by: Jwngdao Bodosa
- Starring: Tikendrajit Narzary; Onjali Basumatary
- Cinematography: Jwngdao Bodosa
- Edited by: Jwngdao Bodosa
- Release date: 1995
- Country: India
- Language: Bodo

Hagramayao Jinahari (known internationally as Rape in The Virgin Forest) is a 1995 Indian Bodo-language drama film directed by Jwngdao Bodosa. The film starred Tikendrajit Narzary and Onjali Basumatary. The film was screened at the India International Centre, Delhi in the 1990s. This film was notably the first Bodo-language film to be screened at the Indian Panorama section of the International Film Festival of India.

The film was a box office success, and it won the National Film Award for Best Film on Environment Conservation/Preservation. After this film, Onjali Basumatary married Jwngdao Bodosa. The film is not available online.

== Plot ==
Set in the Kokrajhar district, the film is about the Indian government's apathy to deforestation.

== Cast ==
- Tikendrajit Narzary as Budang
- Onjali Basumatary as Mithingga (transl. Nature)

== Reception ==
S. R. Ashok Kumar of The Hindu wrote that "Tikendrajit Narzary as the wood cutter and Onjali Basumatary as his daughter have acted convincingly".
