= Don Bosco School, Kokrajhar =

Coordinates: 26.4111523°N 90.2690801°E

- Kokrajhar, Assam; India

Information
- Type: Higher Secondary School
- Motto: Explore & Excel
- School district: Kokrajhar
- Principal: Fr. Emanuel Marngar
- Grades: Nursery - 12
- Language: English
- Campus: Urban
- Houses: Blue House; Red House; Green House; Yellow House
- Affiliations: Central Board of Secondary Education
- Website: https://www.donboscokok.com

Don Bosco School, Kokrajhar, commonly abbreviated to DBSK, is a school of the Catholic Church, situated in the heart of Kokrajhar Town in India. It belongs to and is managed by the Salesians of Don Bosco Educational Society. Guided by the religious and educational philosophy of St. John Bosco, the school was founded to provide education to people who cannot afford expensive quality education.
