= Jiron Basumatary =

Indian politician

Member of the Assam Legislative Assembly
- Incumbent
- Assumed office 2021
- Preceded by: Majendra Narzary
- Constituency: Gossaigaon

Personal details
- Party: United People's Party Liberal
- Education: B.A. from Gauhati University
- Occupation: Social Worker

Jiron Basumatary is an Indian politician and member of the Assam Legislative Assembly from Gossaigaon. Basumatary is a member of the United People's Party Liberal. He won the 2021 elections by elections for Gossaigaon after Majendra Narzary died of COVID-19 in 2021. Previously, he was a member of the Bodoland Territorial Council from Jamduar constituency.
