= Bineswar Brahma =

Indian politician

- Born: 28 February 1948
- Died: 19 August 2000 (aged 52)
- Occupation(s): teacher, poet, author

Bineshwar Brahma (28 February 1948 – 19 August 2000 Bodo: बिनेश्वर ब्रह्म) was the president of the Bodo Sahitya Sabha ('Bodo Literary Union') in Assam, India. He was born in a small village of Bhatarmari in Kokrajhar. He was the son of Late Taramoni Brahma and Late Sanathi Brahma.

== Family ==
- Father's Name: Late Taramoni Brahma,
- Mother's Name: Late Sanathi Brahma,
- Brothers and Sisters: Smt. Thuntri Brahma, Late Bineswar Brahma, Smt. Saya Rani Brahma, Late Rameshwar Brahma, Kameshwar Brahma, Late Buddheswar Brahma, Late Anishwar Brahma, Smt. Sumanti Brahma and Smt. Aruna Brahma.
- Spouse: Smt. Pushpa Rani Brahma(Daughter of Late Harendra Nath Brahma of village Harigaon, Salakati, Kokrajhar),
- Children's: Daniel Brahma and Miss Sharmila Rani Brahma.

== Education ==
Bineshwar Brahma attended his schooling in 1954. He was admitted for his primary education at No. 365 Bhatarmari Primary School from 1954 to 1959. From 1959 to 1962, he attended Kokrajhar Higher Secondary School for his middle school, and from 1962 to 1967 he studied in the same school for his high school. Bineshwar Brahma was a Bisarad in Hindi and he did this in 1965 during his high school. For his higher education Bineshwar Brahma went to Assam Agricultural University, Jorhat for his B.Sc. Degree in 1972.

== Jobs ==
Bineshwar Brahma started his career as a Hindi teacher from 1968-69 in Debargaon Venture High School and later as a teacher only for three months in Kokrajhar Vidyapith High School in 1972. In the same year, i.e. 1972 up to December, he worked as a Field Demonstrator in Assam Agro-Industry. He also worked as an Agronomist in Fertilizer Corporation of India in 1978. He was also appointed as the Deputy Manager of Quality Control (1979) in FCI. Bineshwar Brahma died when he was doing his job of Joint Manager in the zonal office of FCI, Guwahati from 1998 to 2000.

== Literary works ==
- Aini Aroj - Poetry (1988)
- Bardwi Sikhla - Poetry (1997)
- Angni Gami Bhatarmari - Prose (1998)
- Xopun Aru Dithok - Assamese Novel (1998)
- Sima - Short Story

== Social works ==
Bineshwar Brahma was a real Social Worker of the Bodos. He was once the General Secretary of the Students Body in Kokrajhar Higher Secondary School. He was again the General Secretary of the Students Union Body of Assam Agricultural University(1969–71). Bineshwar Brahma participated in the Movement of Assamese Language and jailed for 45 days in Dibrugarh jail(1971). He was also the organizing secretary of A.B.E.F in 1989. Bineshwar Brahma worked for the Bodo Sahitya Sabha as a General Secretary from 1990–93, as Vice-President from 1993–96 and lastly as the Chairperson from 1996-2000. In Bodo language issues, Brahma opposed writing Bodo in Roman script. Instead he advocated the use of Devanagari for writing Bodo, putting him at odds with Christian Bodo groups, like the National Democratic Front of Bodoland.

He also worked on peace efforts between the Assam state government, the Indian Government and various Bodo groups.

== Death ==
He was murdered by the NDFB in Guwahati on 19 August 2000. The NDFB later claimed responsibility for the act, charging that Brahma had been 'an agent of the Bharatiya Janata Party' and that BSS was a front for the rival militant group Bodo Liberation Tigers.

The 4th government engineering college of Assam, Bineswar Brahma Engineering College, which was established in 2010 at Kokrajhar is named after him.
