= Gossaigaon =

Border Town in Assam, India

- Town
- Location in Assam, India Gossaigaon (India)
- Coordinates: 26°25′11″N 89°59′03″E
- Country: India
- State: Assam
- Territorial Region: Bodoland
- District: Kokrajhar
- No. of Wards: 4
- Division: Lower Assam

Government
  - Type: Municipal Corporation
  - Body: Gossaigaon Town Committee
  - Sub Divisional Officer: Rahul Kumar Gupta, IAS

Area
  - Total: 4.000 km^{2} (1.544 sq mi)
- Elevation: 50 m (160 ft)

Population (2011)
  - Total: 9,068
  - Rank: 100th (among towns in Assam)
  - Density: 2,267/km^{2} (5,872/sq mi)

Languages
  - Official: Bodo, English
  - Spoken: Bodo, Assamese, English, Hindi, Bengali
- Time zone: UTC+5:30 (IST)
- PIN: 783360
- Telephone code: +91 3669
- Vehicle registration: AS 16

Gossaigaon is one of the fastest-developing towns and the hometown of the state's youngest Raimona National Park in the Bodoland region of Assam, India. This is a sub-divisional headquarter of Kokrajhar district. It shares its boundaries with the neighboring state of West Bengal in the west and Dhubri district to the south. It is one of the BTR's proposed districts. Gossaigaon is well connected by ground transportation and rails. The town serves as a direct route by road to the state's youngest Rupsi Airport located in the southernmost part of the town. Madati and Sankosh are some of the prominent rivers that flow through the heart of the town, and forested areas include such saleable trees as Shorea robusta (sal), Tectona grandis (teak). This place practices organic farming as well as modern agriculture, following recent scientific developments.

     A statue of Bodofa Upendra Nath Brahma has been placed at the children park in the heart of the town near chariali and inauguration function was held on 18th of May, 2025, statued by Promod Boro, Chief of BTC. A lighting clock tower was also established by the BTC authority at the chariali which showed a symbol of unity. Various cultural ethnic dances are also drawn in the tower. A statue of Netaji Subhas Chandra Bose - a renowned personality from West Bengal was statued near the bank of river Modati in Durgapara area.

== Geography ==
Gossaigaon is located at 26°25′11″N 89°59′03″E. It has an average elevation of 50 metres (164 feet). Vegetation is deciduous and evergreen, also grasslands at patches.

== Demographics ==
As of 2011 India census, The Gossaigaon Town Committee has a population of 9,068 of which 4,782 are males while 4,286 are females as per report released by Census India 2011.

The population of Children between the ages of 0-6 is 968 which is 10.67% of the total population of Gossaigaon (TC). In Gossaigaon Town Committee, the female sex ratio is 896 against the state average of 958. Moreover, the child sex ratio in Gossaigaon is around 963 compared to the Assam state average of 962. The literacy rate of Gossaigaon city is 90.21% higher than the state average of 72.19%. In Gossaigaon, male literacy is around 93.94% while the female literacy rate is 86.01%.

Gossaigaon Town Committee has total administration of over 1,935 houses to which it supplies basic amenities like water and sewerage. It is also authorized to build roads within Town Committee limits and impose taxes on properties coming under its jurisdiction.

Most of the residents are members of Scheduled Tribe(P), followed by religious minority communities, then the Adivasi people.

Gossaigaon Activity Status (A7+) (C 2011)
1. Usually Employed (36.9%)
2. Casually Employed (2.80%)
3. Not employed (60.3%)

== Politics ==
Gossaigaon is a part of the Kokrajhar Lok Sabha Constituency. The current sitting Member of Parliament (MP) in Kokrajhar LS is Jayanta Basumatary from Chirang district and RS MP is Rangwra Narzary. The town is a HQ of no. 1 Gossaigaon constituency of the State Legislative Assembly. Mr. Jiron Basumatary elected through the by-election 2021 and is the current serving Member of the Legislative Assembly (MLA) after the actual elected Majendra Narzary's demise a week after the declaration of the election results Narzary was elected for the fourth consecutive year. Also a part of the 28 Soraibil constituency of the Bodoland Territorial Council (BTC). Mrityunjoy Narzary is the sitting Member of the Council Legislative Assembly (MCLA) of the BTC, representing the town.

Gossaigaon Religion Data (2011)
1. Hinduism (89.5%)
2. Islam (6.75%)
3. Christianity (3.20%)
4. Jainism (0.32%)
5. Sikhism (0.02%)
6. Not Stated (0.18%)

== Education Facilities ==
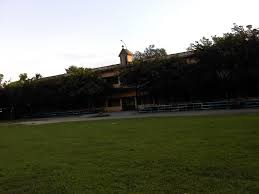
St Antony's E.M. High School (Clicked on 2015)

Colleges

- Gossaigaon College, Since 1971
- Gossaigaon B.Ed College
- Gossaigaon Science Academy
- Rabi Haji Junior College
- Krishna Kanta Handique Open University
- Zamduar College

Schools

- St. Anthony's English Medium School, Since 1984
- Little Star EM School
- Sunrise EM School
- Bodoland Public School
- Blooming Buds School
- Bishuram Memorial ME School
- Girls' HS School
- Shankardev Vidyaniketan School
- Boys' HS School

== Transportation ==
Gossaigaon has a railway station named Gossaigaon Hat Railway Station (GOGH) where all the passenger trains halt. Most people from the Gossaigaon area are suffering a lot from getting service from railway facilities. The Railway Station has a stoppage of Vande Bharat Express, North East express and other express trains. The stoppage of Capital Express, Bangalore Express, Vivek Express etc. is a long-run demand from the people of Gossaigaon. There is also a Bus stand providing buses and small vehicles for traveling towards different parts of lower Assam and border areas of West Bengal. It is well connected to Cooch Behar, Alipurduar, and Siliguri. Also, buses run between Kokrajhar, Bongaigaon, Barpeta, Goalpara and Dhubri. There are a few day super buses that run directly to the main city Guwahati from the town.

== Medical ==
The Ranendra Narayan Basumatary (RNB) Civil Hospital is the largest government hospital in this area, located in the heart of Gossaigaon. It is a 100-bedded civil hospital and is located in the village of Habrubil, near the SDO (C) office. The hospital has its own fame with specialist doctors like gynecologists, general surgeons, medicine, anesthesiologists, dental surgeons, etc. Here, a governmental free disease testing laboratory is also running . There is also a small government hospital in the heart of the town near Gossaigaon Govt. H.S. School, named Gossaigaon Block Primary Health Centre where minor surgery is performed and child care facility as well as vaccination scheme is done.There is an office of the "Sub Divisional Medical officer" just near the Irrigation department guest house. In the town, for treating animals, a good facility for veterinary services is available. There is a state veterinary dispensary and a block veterinary dispensary located near Gossaigaon BPHC .For smooth official work in veterinary services, an office of the "Sub-Divisional Animal Husbandry and Veterinary Officer" is located there.The present Sub Divisional Veterinary Officer is Dr Tarani Kanta Kalita from September, 2024 a popular veterinary surgeon, has been serving the area since 1992.

== Offices ==
Offices are not much available in Gossaigaon except a few for which the locals are required to approach the Kokrajhar District (viz. RTO, Marriage Registrar, etc.). The Police station, Post Office, Circle Office, Telecom Office, Sub-divisional Police Officer, Sub Divisional Agricultural Officer, Sub Divisional Medical Officer, Sub Divisional Fiscery Officer, Sub Divisional Information and Publicity Officer, Sub Treasury, Sub Register, Labour and Employment Officer, S. I. Official, D. I. Official, Divisional Forest Office, PHE office, APDCL office, SC and ST (P) Development office, Fire and Emergency services office, etc. are located side by side in the main town, and the rest are located in Habrubil in the Local Court premises. The highest authority in the town is the Sub Divisional Officer (SDO Civil), whose office is located in the Court Premises Habrubil. The subdivision is also having an agricultural research station named Regional Agricultural Research Station (RARS) located near Telipara 3 km away from the Gossaigaon market. Also having a Krishi Vigyan Kendra (KVK) for the entire district located near the RARS. A sub-divisional agricultural office is also located near Babubil village. The Divisional Forest Office is also located near college road.

== Religious places ==
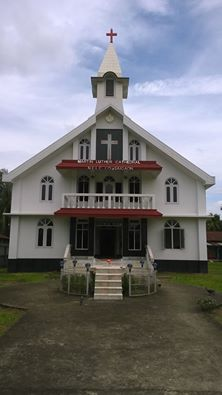
Martin Luther Cathedral (Clicked in 2015)

Temple

- Bathou Thansali
- Giridhari Ashram
- Radha Krisha Mandir
- Thakur Anukul Chandra Joyguru Mandir
- Shani Mandir
- Sitala Devi Mandir
- Ramkrishna Ashram
- Jagotguru Srimanta Sankardev Namghar
- Gosai Baba Dham
- Shiv Mandir
- Borho Hat Kali Mandir
- Uttarpara Hanuman mandir
- Tinali Laxmi Mandir
- Tinali Viswakarma mandir
- Sapot Bridge Kali mandir
- Chariali Maa Shyama mandir

Church

- Martin Luther Cathedral(MLC) NELC Church
- Anthony's Catholic Church
- Presbyterian Independent Church
- Baptist Church
- Pentecost Church

Mosque

- Borho Majzid

== Playgrounds ==
- U.N Brahma Field
- Gossaigaon College Field
- Global FC field
- HS Field
