= Daina (name) =

- Gender: Female

Origin
- Meaning: Song, Hymn
- Region of origin: Latvia, Lithuania

Daina is a Latvian and Lithuanian given name and may refer to:

- Daina Augaitis (born 1953), Canadian curator
- Daina Gudzinevičiūtė (born 1965), Lithuanian Olympic shooting champion
- Daina Moorehouse (born 2001), Irish boxer
- Daina Reid, Australian actor and director
- Daina Šveica (born 1939), Latvian rower
- Daina Taimiņa (born 1954), Latvian mathematician
- Daina Warren, Canadian artist and curator
