= Kokrajhar =

- Town
- Location in Assam, India Kokrajhar (India)
- Coordinates: 26.4°N 90.27°E
- Country: India
- State: Assam
- Territorial Region: Bodoland
- District: Kokrajhar
- Divisions: 10 wards

Government
  - Type: Municipal Board
  - Body: Kokrajhar Municipality Board
- Elevation: 38 m (125 ft)

Population (2011)
  - Total: 34,136

Languages
  - Official: Bodo
  - Most spoken language: Bengali
- Time zone: UTC+5:30 (IST)
- PIN: 783370
- Telephone code: 03661
- Vehicle registration: AS-16
- Sex ratio: 52:50 ♂/♀
- Literacy: 89.96%

Kokrajhar (ˌkɒkrəˈʤɑ:) is a town in the Bodoland Territorial Region, an autonomous territory in Assam, one of the North Eastern states of India.

== Etymology ==
In the Bodo language, "Kokrajhar" means "the land of Koka". The name is derived from "Koka" a mythical figure or ancestor in Bodo folklore, and "Rajhar", meaning land or territory.

In the Kamatapuri language, the name is derived from two words: "Kokra" meaning twisted, and "Jhar" meaning forest.

== History ==
=== Under the Kingdom of Bhutan ===
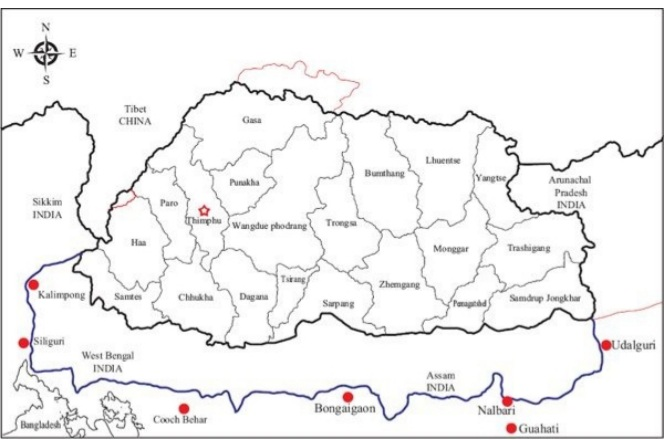
Southern Boundary of Bhutan contained the present Kokrajhar district before the 1865 Duar War

From the early 17th century to 1865, the Kokrajhar district was under the control of the Kingdom of Bhutan, until the Duar Wars in 1865, when the British removed the Bhutanese influence and later the areas were merged into the undivided Goalpara district of the Indian Union in 1949.

== Geography ==
Kokrajhar is located at 26.4°N 90.27°E. It has an average elevation of 38 metres (124 feet).

=== Climate ===
Climate data for Kokrajhar
Month	Jan	Feb	Mar	Apr	May	Jun	Jul	Aug	Sep	Oct	Nov	Dec	Year
Record high °C (°F)	30 (86)	33 (91)	38 (100)	40 (104)	38 (100)	40 (104)	37 (99)	37 (99)	37 (99)	35 (95)	32 (90)	28 (82)	40 (104)
Mean daily maximum °C (°F)	23 (73)	25 (77)	30 (86)	31 (88)	31 (88)	31 (88)	32 (90)	32 (90)	31 (88)	30 (86)	27 (81)	24 (75)	29 (84)
Mean daily minimum °C (°F)	10 (50)	12 (54)	15 (59)	20 (68)	22 (72)	25 (77)	25 (77)	25 (77)	24 (75)	21 (70)	16 (61)	11 (52)	19 (66)
Record low °C (°F)	−2 (28)	−3 (27)	4 (39)	11 (52)	16 (61)	18 (64)	20 (68)	21 (70)	20 (68)	9 (48)	0 (32)	−1 (30)	−3 (27)
Average precipitation mm (inches)	11.4 (0.45)	12.8 (0.50)	57.7 (2.27)	142.3 (5.60)	248.0 (9.76)	350.1 (13.78)	353.6 (13.92)	269.9 (10.63)	166.2 (6.54)	79.2 (3.12)	19.4 (0.76)	5.1 (0.20)	1,717.7 (67.63)
Source: wunderground.com

== Demographics ==
Religion in Kokrajhar town (2011)
1. Hindu (94.8%)
2. Muslim (2.10%)
3. Others (3.10%)

As per 2011 Indian census, Kokrajhar had a population of 34,136.

As of 2001 Indian census, Kokrajhar had a population of 31,152. Males constitute 52% of the population and females constitute 48% of the population. Kokrajhar has an average literacy rate of 79%, higher than the national average of 71%: male literacy is 84%, and female literacy is 74%. In Kokrajhar, 10% of the population is under 6 years of age. The district has 3 sub divisions Kokrajhar, Gossaigaon and Parbotjhora.

=== Language ===
Languages spoken in Kokrajhar (2011)
1. Bengali (51.8%)
2. Bodo (25.0%)
3. Hindi (8.63%)
4. Assamese (8.06%)
5. Bhojpuri (1.89%)
6. Rajbanshi (1.28%)
7. Nepali (1.17%)
8. Marwari (0.84%)
9. Others (1.26%)

Bengali is the most spoken language at 17,693 speakers, followed by Bodo at 8,549, Hindi spoken by 2,946 people and Assamese at 2,752, with smaller but significant number of Bhojpuri, Rajbanshi, Nepali and Marwari speakers.

== Transportation ==
Rupsi Airport is situated 66 kilometres (41 mi) west from Kokrajhar town.

Kokrajhar is served by the government owned Assam State Transport Corporation, Bodoland Transport Services and many private bus operators.

The Kokrajhar railway station lies on the New Jalpaiguri–New Bongaigaon section of Barauni–Guwahati line under the Northeast Frontier Railway with services to important cities of the country like Guwahati, Kolkata, New Delhi, Mumbai, Chennai etc.

Important trains like Rajdhani Express, Kamrup Express, Brahmaputra Mail, North East Express, Vivek Express, Garib Rath Express, Avadh Assam Express etc. have their stoppage at Kokrajhar railway station.

== Education ==
The town has many schools and colleges, with English being the sole medium of instruction in higher education. All the colleges under the jurisdiction of Bodoland Territorial Council are affiliated under Bodoland University since 2017.

=== Schools ===
- Don Bosco School, Kokrajhar

=== Universities and colleges ===
- Bineswar Brahma Engineering College
- Central Institute of Technology, Kokrajhar
- Commerce College, Kokrajhar
- Kokrajhar Medical College and Hospital

== Politics ==
Kokrajhar consists of three assembly constituencies: Kokrajhar East, Kokrajhar West and Gossaigaon, which all are part of Kokrajhar (Lok Sabha constituency).

Joyanta Basumatary from United People's Party, Liberal is the current member of Lok Sabha from Kokrajhar Lok Sabha constituency.

== Notable personalities ==
- Halicharan Narzary, national footballer
- Hagrama Mohilary, ex chief of BTC and chairperson of Bodoland People's Front
- Durga Boro, footballer
- Bineshwar Brahma, politician, poet, teacher
- Apurna Narzary, national footballer

== See also ==
- Kokrajhar (Lok Sabha constituency)

== Sources ==
- Phuntsho, Karma (2013). The History of Bhutan. Penguin Books. ISBN 9781908323583.
