= Kokrajhar district =

Administrative district of Assam, India

Coordinates: 26°24′00″N 90°16′12″E

- District of Assam
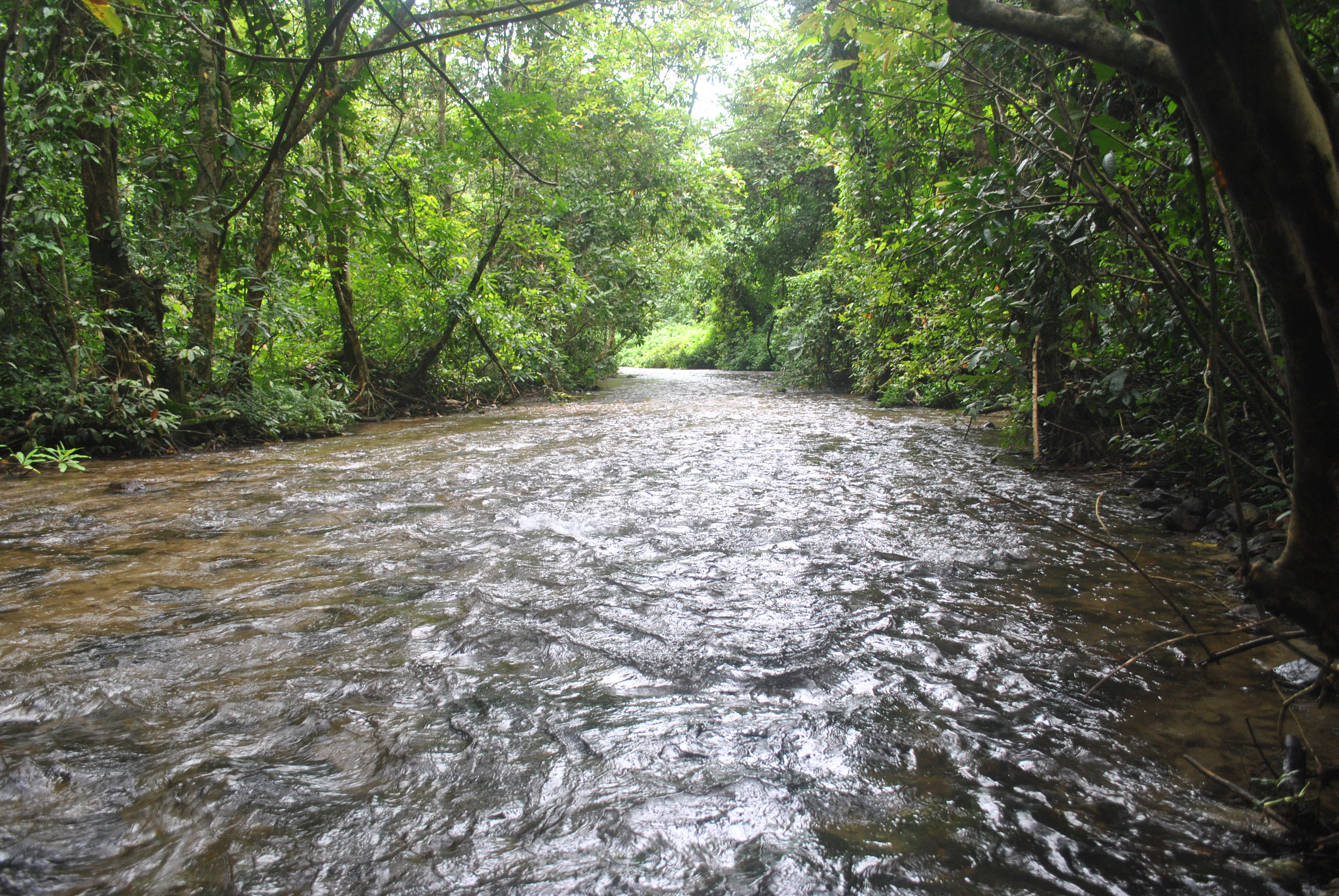
- Stream in Raimona National Park

- Map of Kokrajhar district in Assam
- Country: India
- State: Assam
- Territorial Region: Bodoland
- Headquarters: Kokrajhar

Government
  - Lok Sabha constituencies: Kokrajhar (shared with Chirang district)
  - Vidhan Sabha constituencies: Gossaigaon, Kokrajhar West, Kokrajhar East

Area
  - Total: 3,169.22 km^{2} (1,223.64 sq mi)

Population (2011)
  - Total: 887,142
  - Density: 279.924/km^{2} (725.001/sq mi)
- Time zone: UTC+05:30 (IST)
- ISO 3166 code: IN-AS
- Website: kokrajhar.assam.gov.in

Kokrajhar district is an administrative district in Bodoland Territorial Region of Assam. It is predominantly inhabited by the Boro tribe. The district has its headquarters located at Kokrajhar town and occupies an area of 3,169.22 km^{2} (1,223.64 sq mi). It has two civil sub-divisions namely Parbatjhora and Gossaigaon and five revenue circles namely Kokrajhar, Dotma, Bhaoraguri, Gossaigaon and Bagribarilll.

== History ==
From the map of 1776 Rennell, Kokrajhar was spelled CONKERAJHAR.

=== Under the Kingdom of Bhutan ===
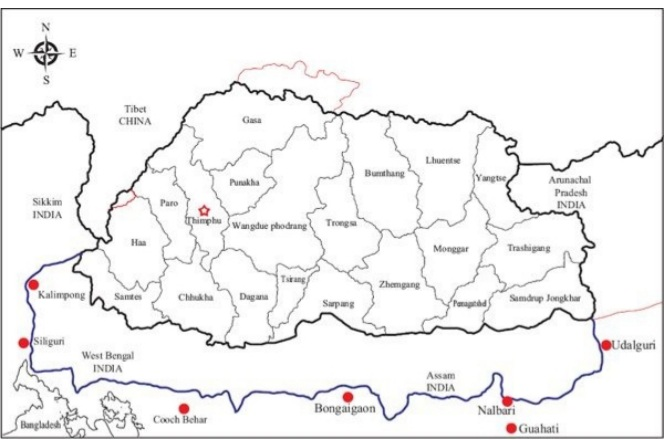
Southern Boundary of Bhutan contained the present Kokrajhar district before the 1865 Duar War

From early 17th-century present-day Kokrajhar district was under the control of Kingdom of Bhutan, till the Duar Wars in 1865 when British removed the Bhutanese influence and later the areas were merged to undivided Goalpara district of the Indian Union in 1949.

The Druk Desi (Dzongkha: འབྲུག་སྡེ་སྲིད་) of Bhutan appointed Paro Penlop to look after the Duars, who in turn appointed local people as Subah or Laskar, below this was an officer called Kamta who was appointed directly by the Deb Raja of Bhutan.

=== 1947 - Present ===
Kokrajhar was a part the undivided Goalpara district. In 1957, under the administration of Bimala Prasad Chaliha as the Chief Minister of Assam, three sub-divisions were created one of which was Kokrajhar. This sub-division was made into a district on 1 July 1983.

On 29 September 1989 Bongaigaon district was created from parts of Kokrajhar and Goalpara.

== Geography ==
Kokrajhar district occupies an area of 3,129 square kilometres (1,208 sq mi), comparatively equivalent to Indonesia's Waigeo Island. Kokrajhar district is located on the northern bank of the Brahmaputra river. It forms the gateway to the Seven Sister States. Kokrajhar shares its boundary with Bongaigaon (now known as Chirang), Dhubri, West Bengal, Barpeta and Bhutan. Part of the district is made up of Manas National Park.

== Economy ==
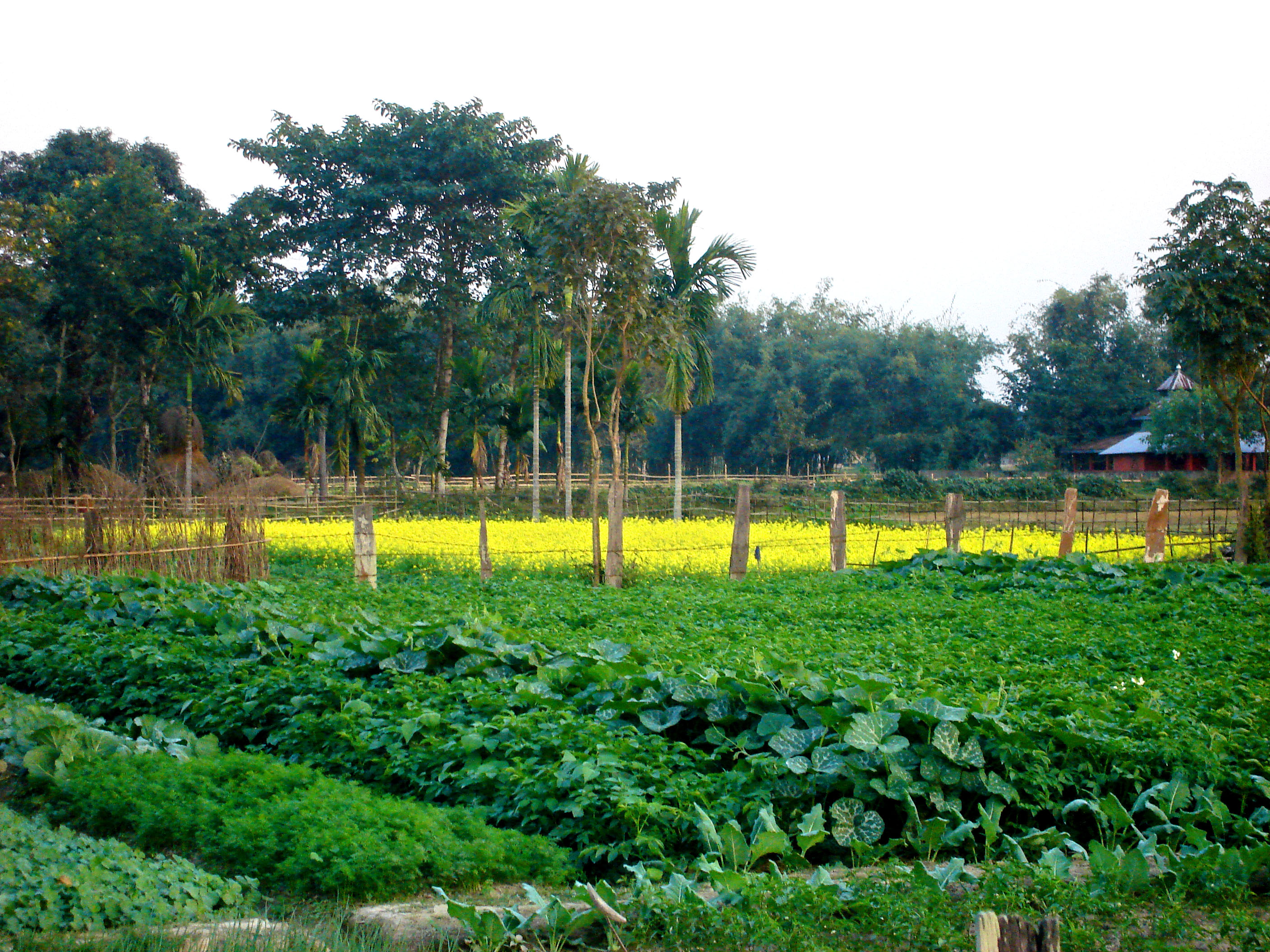
Agriculture in Kokrajhar district

In 2006 the Indian government named Kokrajhar one of the country's 250 most backward districts (out of a total of 640). It is one of the eleven districts in Assam currently receiving funds from the Backward Regions Grant Fund Programme (BRGF).

== Divisions ==
There are four Assam Legislative Assembly constituencies in this district: Gossaigaon, Kokrajhar West, Kokrajhar East, and Sidli. All but Gossaigaon are designated for scheduled tribes. All four are in the Kokrajhar Lok Sabha constituency.

== Demographics ==
Historical population
Year	Pop.	±%
1901	79,378	—
1911	103,171	+30.0%
1921	130,947	+26.9%
1931	151,581	+15.8%
1941	174,060	+14.8%
1951	190,164	+9.3%
1961	270,930	+42.5%
1971	416,996	+53.9%
1991	744,609	+78.6%
2001	843,243	+13.2%
2011	887,142	+5.2%
Source: Census of India

According to the 2011 census Kokrajhar district has a population of 887,142, roughly equal to the nation of Fiji. This gives it a ranking of 467th in India (out of a total of 640). The district has a population density of 280 inhabitants per square kilometre (730/sq mi). Its population growth rate over the decade 2001-2011 was 5.19%. Kokrajhar has a sex ratio of 958 females for every 1000 males, and a literacy rate of 66.63%. 6.19% of the population lives in urban areas. Scheduled Castes and Scheduled Tribes make up 3.33% and 31.41% of the population respectively.

=== Religion ===
Religion in Kokrajhar district (2011)
Religion	Percent
Hinduism	59.64%
Islam	28.44%
Christianity	11.40%
Other or not stated	0.52%

Population of circles by religion
Circle	Hindus (%)	Muslims (%)	Christians (%)	Other
Gossaigaon (Part)	53.68	21.07	24.90	0.35
Bhowraguri	37.29	62.05	0.51	0.15
Dotoma	69.83	26.60	3.18	0.39
Kokrajhar (Part)	76.30	15.76	6.86	1.08
Golokganj (Part)	59.57	32.53	7.71	0.19
Dhubri (Part)	35.69	55.70	8.55	0.06
Bagribari (Part)	43.39	46.56	9.69	0.36
Bilasipara (Part)	30.51	69.30	0.07	0.12
Chapar (Part)	38.32	54.59	6.64	0.45

=== Languages ===
Languages spoken in Kokrajhar district (2011)
1. Boro (28.4%)
2. Assamese (19.9%)
3. Bengali (17.8%)
4. Santali (11.9%)
5. Rajbongshi (7.62%)
6. 'Other' Assamese (3.86%)
7. Rabha (2.58%)
8. Hindi (1.76%)
9. Nepali (1.65%)
10. Kurukh (1.42%)
11. Garo (1.21%)
12. Others (1.91%)

According to the 2011 census, 28.39% of the population spoke Boro, 19.92% Assamese, 17.78% Bengali, 11.90% Santali, 7.62% Rajbongshi, 2.58% Rabha, 1.76% Hindi, 1.65% Nepali, 1.42% Kurukh and 1.21% Garo as their first language. 3.86% of the population recorded their language as 'Others' under Assamese.

== Flora and fauna ==
In 1990 Kokrajhar district became home to Manas National Park, which has an area of 500 km^{2} (193.1 mi^{2}). It shares the park with four other districts.

== Notable people ==
- Bineshwar Brahma, poet and author
- Upendranath Brahma, Bodo leader
- Ranjit Shekhar Mooshahary, IPS officer, director general of National Security Guards and Border Security Force, former governor of Meghalaya.
- Kameshwar Brahma, writer, president of Bodo Sahitya Sabha and Padma Shri recipient
- Kalicharan Brahma, renowned social and religious reformer of Parbatjhora

== See also ==
- Bengali language
- Santali language
- Bodo people
- Bodo culture
- Bodo language
- Bodo Sahitya Sabha
- Bodoland
- Dholmara

== Sources ==
- Das, Smriti (1998). Assam Bhutan relations with special reference to duars from 1681 to 1949 (PhD). Guwahati University. hdl:10603/67909. Archived from the original on 16 March 2023.
- Phuntsho, Karma (2013). The History of Bhutan. Penguin Books. ISBN 9781908323583.
