= Boro language (India) =

Tibeto-Burman language

Boro
- Bodo
- बरʼ
- The words Boro Rao (Boro language) written in Devanagari script
- Native to: Northeast India
- Region: Bodoland (Assam)
- Ethnicity: Boro
- Native speakers: 1.4 million (2011 census)
- Language family: Sino-Tibetan: Tibeto-Burman; Central Tibeto-Burman?; Sal; Boro–Garo; Boroic; Boro
- Writing system: Devanagari (official); Eastern Nagari (contemporary); Latin (contemporary)

Official status
- Official language in: India: Assam

Language codes
- ISO 639-3: brx
- Glottolog: bodo1269
- Map of Bodoland region where the primary spoken language is Bodo

Boro (बरʼ, IPA: [bɔro]), also rendered Bodo, is a Tibeto-Burman language spoken primarily by the Boro ethnic group of Northeast India and the neighboring countries of Nepal and Bangladesh. It is an official language of the Indian state of Assam, predominantly spoken in the Bodoland Territorial Region. It is also one of the twenty-two languages listed in the Eighth Schedule of the Constitution of India. Since 1975 the language has been written using the Devanagari script. It was formerly written using Latin and Eastern-Nagari scripts. Some scholars have suggested that the language used to have its own now lost script known as Deodhai.

== Geographic distribution ==
In India, Bodo is spoken in the following places:

- Assam: mostly in Bodoland Territorial Region, also in Goalpara District, Sonitpur District, Bongaigaon District, Lakhimpur district,Dhemaji district and other districts.
- Meghalaya: West Garo Hills district, East Khasi Hills District
- Manipur: Chandel District, Tengnoupal District.
- West Bengal: Cooch Behar District, Jalpaiguri District, Alipurduar District, Kolkata.
- Arunachal Pradesh
- Nagaland

There are also Bodo speakers in the Jhapa District of Nepal and also in Bangladesh. There are also 6,700 Bodo in Bhutan, mostly in southern Bhutan which borders India.

Bodo devotional folk song

== History ==
As result of socio-political awakenings and movements launched by different Boro organisations since 1913, the language was introduced in 1963 as a medium of instruction in the primary schools in Boro dominated areas. Today, the Boro language serves as a medium of instruction up to the secondary level and it is an associated official language in the state of Assam. Boro language and literature have been offered as a post-graduate course at the University of Guwahati since 1996. There are a large number of Boro books on poetry, drama, short stories, novels, biography, travelogues, children's literature, and literary criticism. Though there exists different dialects, the Western Boro dialect Swnabari form used around Kokrajhar district has emerged as the standard.

== Writing system and script movement ==
It is reported that the Boro and the Dimasa languages used a script called Deodhai that is no longer attested. The Latin script was used first to write down the language, when a prayer book was published in 1843, and then extensively used by the missionary Sidney Endle beginning 1884 and in 1904, when the script was used to teach children. The first use of the Assamese/Bengali script occurred in 1915 (Boroni Fisa o Ayen) and the first magazine, Bibar (1924–1940) was tri-lingual in Boro, Assamese and Bengali, with Boro written in Assamese/Bengali script. In 1952, the Bodo Sahitya Sabha decided to use the Assamese script exclusively for the language. In 1963 Boro was introduced in schools as a medium of instruction, in which Assamese script was used. Into the 1960s the Boro language was predominantly written in Assamese/Bengali script, though the Christian community continued to use Latin for Boro.

=== Boro Script Movement ===
With the Assamese Language Movement in Assam peaking in the 1960s the Boro community felt threatened and decided to not use the Assamese script. After a series of proposals and expert committees the Bodo Sahitya Sabha reversed itself in 1970 and unanimously decided to adopt the Latin script for the language in its 11th annual conference. The BSS submitted this demand to the Assam Government in 1971, which was rejected on the grounds that the Latin script was of foreign origin. This instigated a movement for the Latin script which became a part of the movement for a separate state, Udayachal, then led by the Plains Tribe Council of Assam (PTCA). In this context, the Boro leaders were advised by the Prime Minister Indira Gandhi to choose any Indic script other than Latin or Tibetan. In defiance of the Assam Government the BSS, in April 1974, went ahead and published Bithorai, a Boro textbook, in Latin script and asked school teachers to follow it.

Retaliating against the unilateral decision, the Assam Government withheld grants to schools using the Latin script. This triggered a phase of active movement that was joined by the All Bodo Students' Union (ABSU) and the PTCA. This led to a critical situation in November 1974 when fifteen volunteers of the movement died in a police firing, and many others were injured. Unable to resolve the issue, the Assam Government referred the matter to the Union Government. In the discussion, the Union Government suggested Devanagari script as the solution to the problem, which the BSS accepted in the Memorandum of Understanding in April 1975, and adopted later year in the Annual Conference. This ended the Boro Script Movement.

=== Final Acceptance of Devanagari script ===
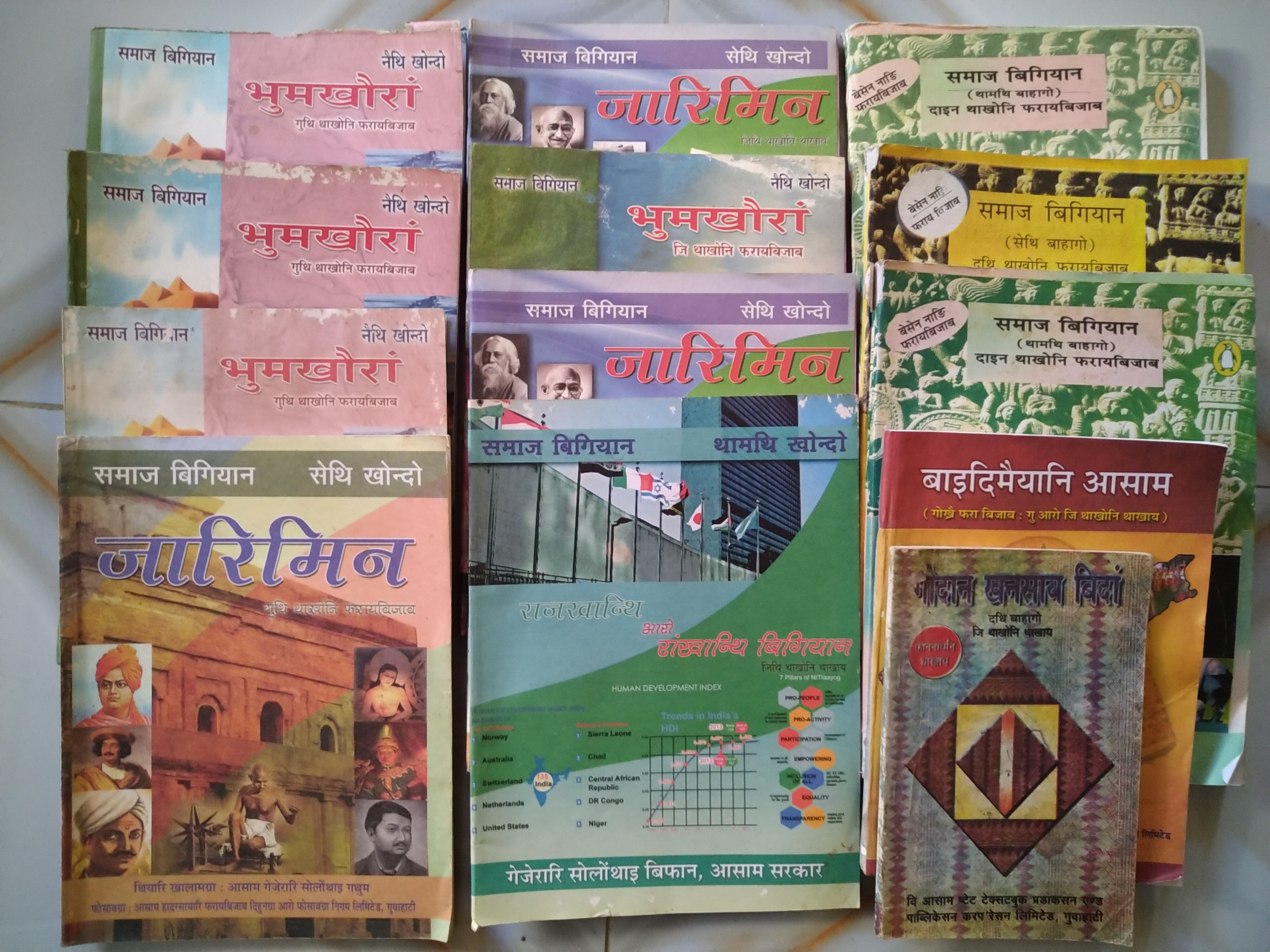
Boro-language textbooks for secondary schools written in Devanagari script

The Devanagari script for Boro was an unexpected development and it was not immediately accepted by the wider Boro community. The BSS failed to implement the use of the Devanagari script, and writers continued to use the Assamese/Bengali and Latin scripts. In 1982, ABSU included the demand of the Latin script in Boro schools in its charter of Demands. Following an expert committee report, constituted by BSS, the Bodoland Autonomous Council adopted a resolution to use Latin script in its territory, which the Assam Government too accepted.

Nevertheless, in the discussion with the Bodo Liberation Tigers, the Union Government demanded the implementation of the earlier agreement with the BSS on the use of the Devanagari script if the Boro language was to be included in the Eighth Schedule of the Indian Constitution. Following this, the ABSU and the BSS surrendered and agreed to use the Devanagari script exclusively, and the matter was settled.

== Dialects ==
Kiryu (2012) suggests that the language of the Mech people and the Boro of Bengal are western dialects whereas the dialects in Assam are the eastern dialects of Boro. The western dialects differ in phonology and grammar but are mutually intelligible. The Kokrajhar variety of the eastern dialects has been promoted as standard, at least for the eastern dialects.

== Phonology ==
The Boro language has a total of 30 phonemes: 6 vowels, 16 consonants, and 8 diphthongs—with a strong prevalence of the high back unrounded vowel /ɯ/. The Boro language use tones to distinguish words. There are three different tones: high, medium and low. The difference between high and low tones is apparent and quite common.

=== Vowels ===
There are 6 vowels in Boro.

	Front	Central	Back
Close	i ⟨i⟩	ɯ ⟨w⟩	u ⟨u⟩
Mid	e ⟨e⟩		o ⟨o⟩
Open		a ⟨a⟩	

- All vowels occur at the beginning, in the middle and at the end of syllables.
- /ɯ/ is an unrounded back vowel.

=== Diphthongs ===
Diphthongs
	i	o	u
i			iu
e		eo	
a	ai	ao	
o	oi		
u	ui		
ɯ	ɯi		ɯu

=== Consonants ===
Boro has 16 consonants.

		Labial	Alveolar	Dorsal	Glottal
Nasal		m ⟨m⟩	n ⟨n⟩	ŋ ⟨ng⟩	
Plosive	aspirated	pʰ ⟨ph⟩	tʰ ⟨th⟩	kʰ ⟨kh⟩	
Plosive	voiced	b ⟨b⟩	d ⟨d⟩	g ⟨g⟩	
Fricative	voiceless		s ⟨s⟩		
Fricative	voiced		z ⟨z⟩		ɦ ⟨h⟩
Approximant		w ⟨w⟩	l ⟨l⟩	j ⟨y⟩	
Vibrant			ɾ ~ r ⟨r⟩		

- Notably, Boro lacks tenuis /p t k/ plosives.
- /pʰ tʰ kʰ/ are unreleased [p̚ t̚ k̚] syllable-finally.
- /b d g/ are released and do not occur word-finally.
- /pʰ tʰ kʰ s/ are sometimes voiced [b d g z].
- /m n b d l ɾ/ occur in all positions.
- /pʰ tʰ kʰ g s ɦ/ do not occur word-finally in native words but occur in loanwords.
- /ŋ j w/ do not occur word-initially.

=== Tones ===
Since Boro is a tonal language, changes in tone affect the meaning:

Examples of high and low tone and difference in meaning
High	Meaning	Low	Meaning
Buh	to beat	Bu	to swell
Hah	mud, to be able	Ha	to cut
Hahm	to get thin	Ham	to get well
Gwdwh	to sink	Gwdw	past
Jah	to eat	Ja	to be
Rahn	to get dry	Ran	to divide

== Grammar ==
=== Sentence structure ===
Sentences in Boro consist of either a "Subject + Verb" or a "Subject + Object + Verb".

Examples of sentences in Boro
Subject + Verb	Subject + Object + Verb
Ang mwnthiya	Laimwn ah Apple jadwng
Nijwm ah undudwng	Nwng wngkham jabai?
Ang fɯibai	Ang nɯkhɯo mɯzang mɯnɯ

== Vocabulary ==
=== Numerals ===
Bodo has a decimal system and counts to 10 with unique words, after which the number words combine to add to the larger number as shown in the chart below.

Numerals in Boro and Garo language comparison
Number	In Boro	In English	In Garo (A.chikku)
0	Latikho	Zero	
1	Se	One	Sa
2	Nwi	Two	Gni
3	Tham	Three	Gittam
4	Brwi	Four	Bri
5	Ba	Five	Bonga
6	Do	Six	Dok
7	Sni	Seven	Sni
8	Daen	Eight	Chet
9	Gu	Nine	Sku
10	Zi	Ten	Chikking
11	Zi se	Eleven	
12	Zi nwi	Twelve	
13	Zi tham	Thirteen	
14	Zi brwi	Fourteen	
15	Zi ba	Fifteen	
16	Zi do	Sixteen	
17	Zi sni	Seventeen	
18	Zi daen	Eighteen	
19	Zi gu	Nineteen	
20	Nwi zi	Twenty	
30	Tham Zi	Thirty	
40	Brwi Zi	Forty	
50	Ba Zi	Fifty	
60	Do Zi	Sixty	
70	Sni Zi	Seventy	
80	Daen Zi	Eighty	
90	Gu Zi	Ninety	
100	Zause/ Se zau	One Hundred	
200	Nwi zau	Two Hundred	
300	Tham zau	Three Hundred	
1,000	Se Rwza	One Thousand	
2,000	Nwi Rwza	Two Thousand	
10,000	Zi Rwza	Ten Thousand	

== Education ==
Starting from 2017, students in tribal areas who do not want to study Assamese must study either Boro or Bengali. The language study is mandatory in all schools til class 10, including those under the Central Board of Secondary Education, Kendriya Vidyalaya Sangathan, and Navodaya Vidyalaya Samiti.

== Sample text ==
The following is a sample text in Boro, of Article 1 of the Universal Declaration of Human Rights, with a transliteration (IAST) and transcription (IPA).

Boro in Devanagari Script
गासै सुबुं आनो उदांयै मान सनमान आरो मोनथाय लाना जोनोम लायो। बिसोरो मोजां- गाज्रि सान्नो हानाय गोहो आरो सोलो दं। बिसोरो गावखौनो गाव बिदा फंबाय बायदि बाहाय लायनांगौ।

Transliteration (ISO 15919)
Gāsai subuṁ āno udāṁyai mān sanmān āro monthāy lānā jonom lāyo. Bisorā mojāṁ-gājri sānno hānāy goho āro solo daṁ. Bisoro gāvkhauno gāv bidā phaṁbāy bāydi bāhāy lāynāṁgau.

Boro in Latin script
Gaswi subung anw udangwi man sanman arw mwnthai lana jwnwm layw. Biswrw mwjang-gajri sannw hanai gwhw arw swlw dong. Biswrw gaokhwunw gao bida phongbai baidi bahai lainangwu.

Translation (grammatical)

All human beings are born free and equal in dignity and rights. They are endowed with reason and conscience and should act towards one another in a spirit of brotherhood.

== See also ==
- Boro people
- Bodo Sahitya Sabha
- Kokborok language
- Languages of Asia
- List of Bodo-language films
