= Ostad Kamini Kumar Narzary =

- Also known as: Ostad Kamini Kumar Narzi, Ustad Kamini Kumar Narzary
- Born: Kamini Kumar Narzary; 9 November 1926; Bamunkura, Binyakhata, Undivided Goalpara (now Kokrajhar), Assam, India
- Origin: Gossaigaon, Kokrajhar, Assam
- Died: 16 May 1998 (aged 72) Assam, India
- Genres: Bodo folk, traditional
- Occupations: Dancer, composer, cultural patron, music teacher
- Instruments: Sifung, Kham, Serja
- Award: Sangeet Natak Akademi Award (1981)

Ostad Kamini Kumar Narzary (9 November 1926 – 16 May 1998), also spelled Ustad Kamini Kumar Narzary, was an Indian folk dancer, composer, and a foundational patron of Bodo traditional culture. He is widely known for elevating Bodo folk music and dances, particularly the Bagurumba and Kherai, from rural community traditions onto national and international platforms.

== Early life and family ==
Kamini Kumar Narzary was born on 9 November 1926 in the village of Bamunkura in the Binyakhata area of present-day Gossaigaon subdivision of Bodoland in Assam, India. His father was Bajaram Narzary and Mother was Thangali Narzary.

Growing up in the region, he developed a deep mastery of the complex oral musical styles, indigenous instruments, and ritual dances of the Bodo community, devoting his early life to preserving traditions that were falling into decay due to rapid modernisation.

== Cultural career and historic performances ==
Narzary's career marked a turning point in the institutionalization and public broadcasting of Bodo folklore. After a major performance of traditional wedding songs on ⁣All India Radio⁣’s open-air show in ⁣Delhi, he returned to Assam with a structured mission to reform, expand and popularise Bodo performing arts.

He led several high-profile delegations and cultural exhibitions over the decades:

- Delhi Republic Day Parade 1957: On 26 January 1957, Narzary led a cultural group to New Delhi to perform the nature-inspired folk dance Bagurumba during India's national Republic Day celebrations, introducing the dance form to a wider pan-Indian audience.
- Indo-Soviet Art Exhibition (1977): He directed and performed a traditional Bodo cultural dance at the diplomatic summit held in Guwahati.
- Janajati Lok-Nritya Pradarshani (1982): On 29 July 1982, the Narzary cultural group represented the community at the prominent indigenous folk dance exhibition held at Rabindra Bhavan, Guwahati.
- 11th India International Trade Fair (IITF) 1992: Narzary and his troupe participated in the international fair, where their presentation of the नासिना मोसानाय (Fermented Fish dance) achieved widespread critical acclaim.

== Mastery of instruments and teaching ==
He was conferred with the title Ostad (or Ustad) by cultural scholars and community leaders for his unmatched expertise, he established formal instructional frameworks for Bodo arts. He was an expert teacher of essential regional instruments, including the Sifung (a five-holed bamboo flute), the Kham (a traditional double-headed drum), and the Serja (a bowed string instrument).

== Awards and legacy ==
In recognition of his lifelong dedication and pioneering work for the traditional tribal arts of Northeast India, Narzary was awarded the prestigious Sangeet Natak Akademi Award in 1981 by the national academy of music, dance, and drama of India.

Ostad Kamini Kumar Narzary died on 16 May 1998. He is universally revered as one of the key architects of the 20th-century Bodo cultural renaissance, and his legacy continues through various music schools and dance academies that perpetuate his teaching methodologies across the Bodoland Territorial Region.

== See also ==
- Bodo culture
- Bagurumba
- Kherai
- Sifung
- Gossaigaon
