= Hinduism in Assam =

Hinduism in Assam অসমত হিন্দু ধৰ্ম
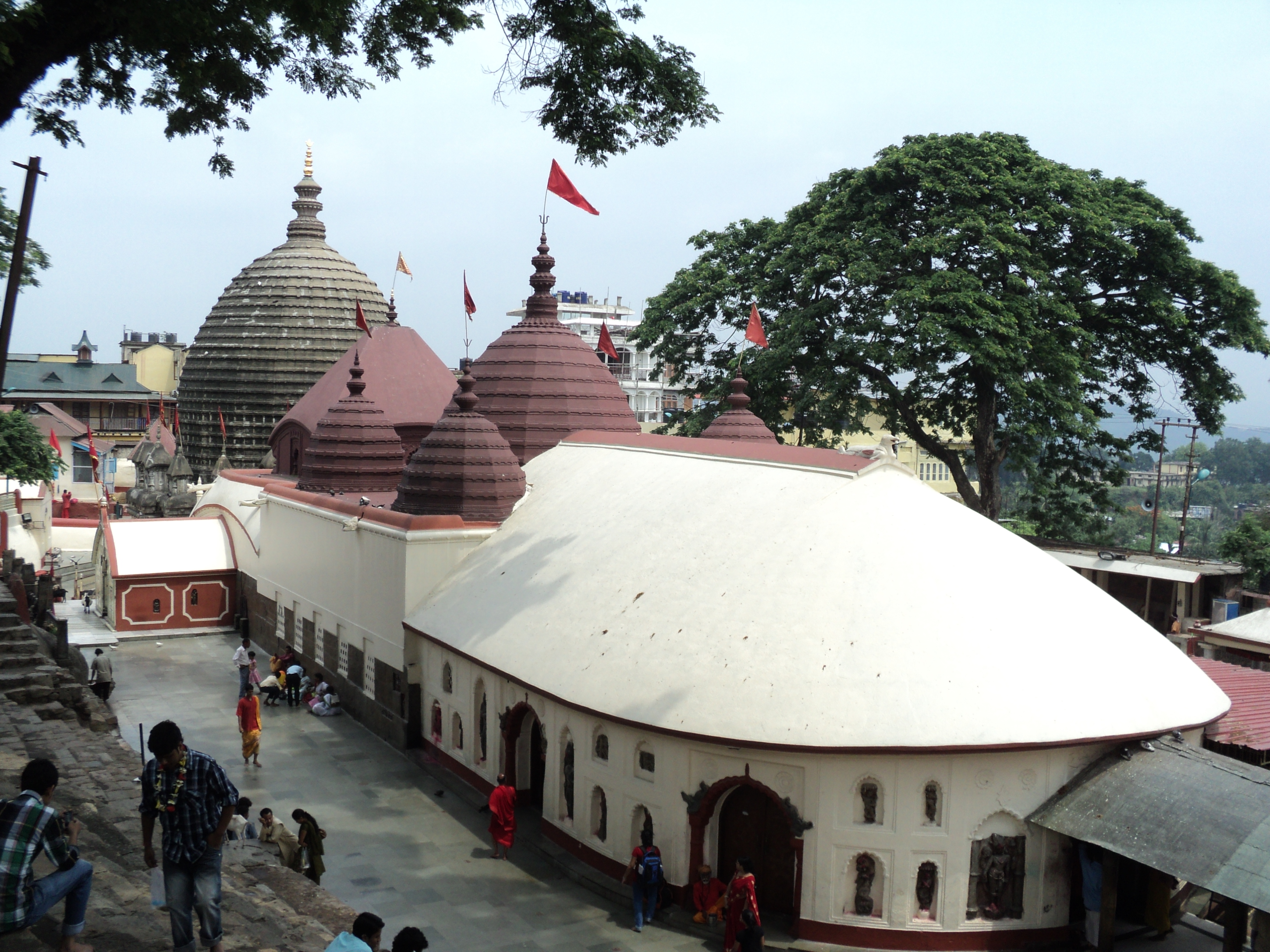
- Kamakhya Temple in Guwahati, Assam.

Total population
- 19,180,759 (2011 census) ▲ (61.47% of population)▼

Languages
- Majority; Assamese; Minority; Bengali, Bodo, Karbi, Dimasa, Hindi, Manipuri, Sadri, Mising, Deori, Nepali and others

Religion
- Hinduism

Related ethnic groups
- Assamese Muslims and Assamese Christians

Hinduism is the dominant religion practised in the state of Assam. According to some scholars, it is home to some of the most complex and poorly understood traditions in Hinduism. People follow traditions belonging to Shaivism, Shaktism, Tantra, and an indigenous form of Vaishnavism called Ekasarana Dharma; taken together the practitioners constitute around 61% of the state population as per the 2011 Census. Hindus form a majority in 17 out of the 29 districts of Assam. By region, there is a significant diversity among the ethnic groups that profess the Hindu faith, traditions, and customs. As per as 2011 Census, In Brahmaputra Valley of Assam, Hindus constitute 62% of the population, the majority being ethnic Assamese. In the autonomous Bodoland region of Assam, Hindus constitute 71.3% of the region's population, most being of the Bodo tribe. In the Barak Valley region of southern Assam, Hindus constitute 50% of the region's population, most being ethnic Bengalis. The Hill Tribes of Assam, particularly the Karbi people of Karbi Anglong and Dimasa people of Dima Hasao, are mainly Animists.

== History ==
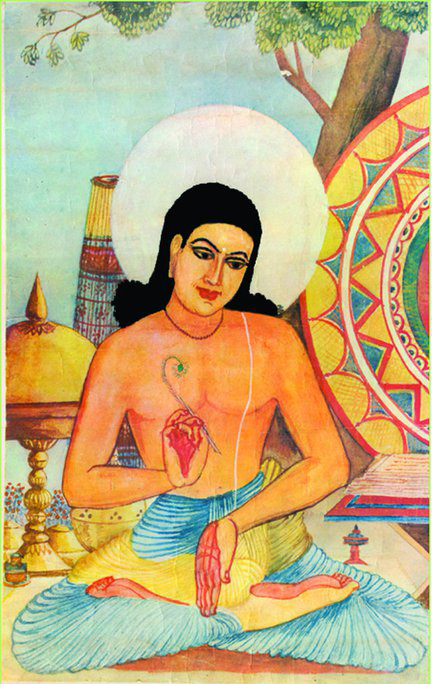
Sankardev, founder of Ekasarna sect of Hinduism

Most of the Hindus in Assam belongs to the Ekasarna sect of Vaishnavism which is the dominant faith of the region since its formation from 15th–16th century in Brahmaputra valley, Assam. The Ahom kings during their 600 yrs rule in Assam, have increasingly patronizing Hinduism alongside the proselytizing activities of Ekasarana Dharma since the 16th-century—a large section of the Bodo-Kachari peoples converted to different forms of Hinduism in the 17th–18th century and a composite Assamese consisting of caste-Hindus, tribals began to form. Suhungmung, was the first Ahom king who have converted into Hinduism and adopt a Hindu title, Swarganarayana during that medieval period of ahom rule. But some sources also argue that Jayadhwaj Singha was the first Ahom king who have formally accepted Hinduism. Rudra Singha was the first who announced publicly of his inclination towards Hinduism and consequently later on he became a disciple of a Hindu Brahman priest. The historical roots of the Hindu religion in Assam dates back to at least 4th–7th centuries when Varman dynasty were ruling in the region. Vedic sacrifices such as the Ashvamedha and other Brahmanical rites and rituals were prevalent in this region during that period. The form of Hinduism that developed in the Assam region has long been a complex negotiation link between Vedic traditions with indigenous folk practices and beliefs. Before the arrival of Hindu religion in the fertile valley of Brahmaputra, Majority of ethnic Assamese people practiced an indigenous religion known as Ahom religion, followed by Bodo people who professed Bathouism and various ethnic tribals like Karbi, Dimasa, Mising and Rabha were practitioners of Animism prior to the coming of Hinduism in the valley.

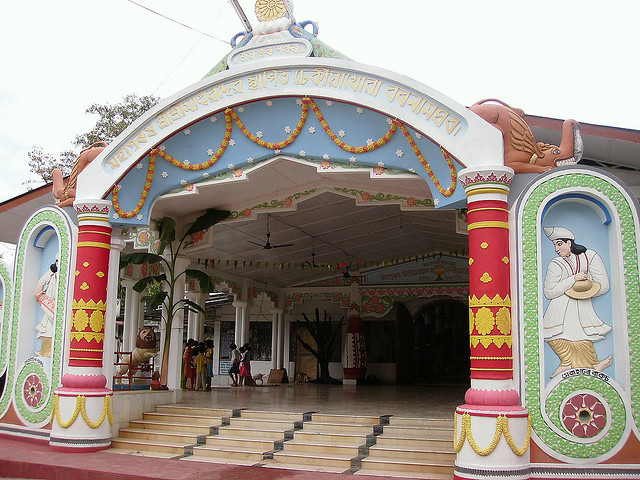
Dhekiakhowa Bornamghar at Jorhat

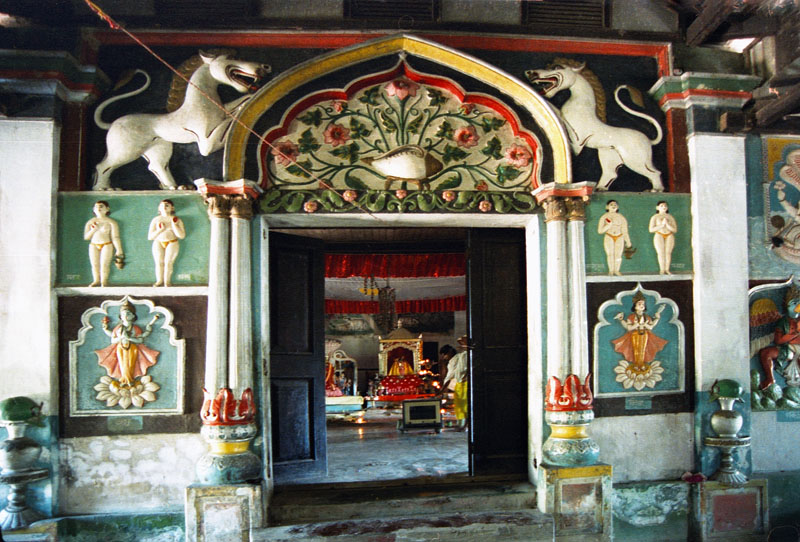
Sanctorium of the Dakhinpat Sattra in Majuli

The Vaishnavism which is a prominent sect of Hinduism in Assam do not believe in idol worship and perform "Naamkirtan", where the glory of formless Lord Vishnu is recited and chanted. There are two important cultural and religious institutions that influence the religious fabric of Assam: the "Satras", is a site of religious and cultural practice and the "Namghar", the house of prayers where religious people meet and pray together as a community.

== Festivals ==
=== Bohag bihu ===
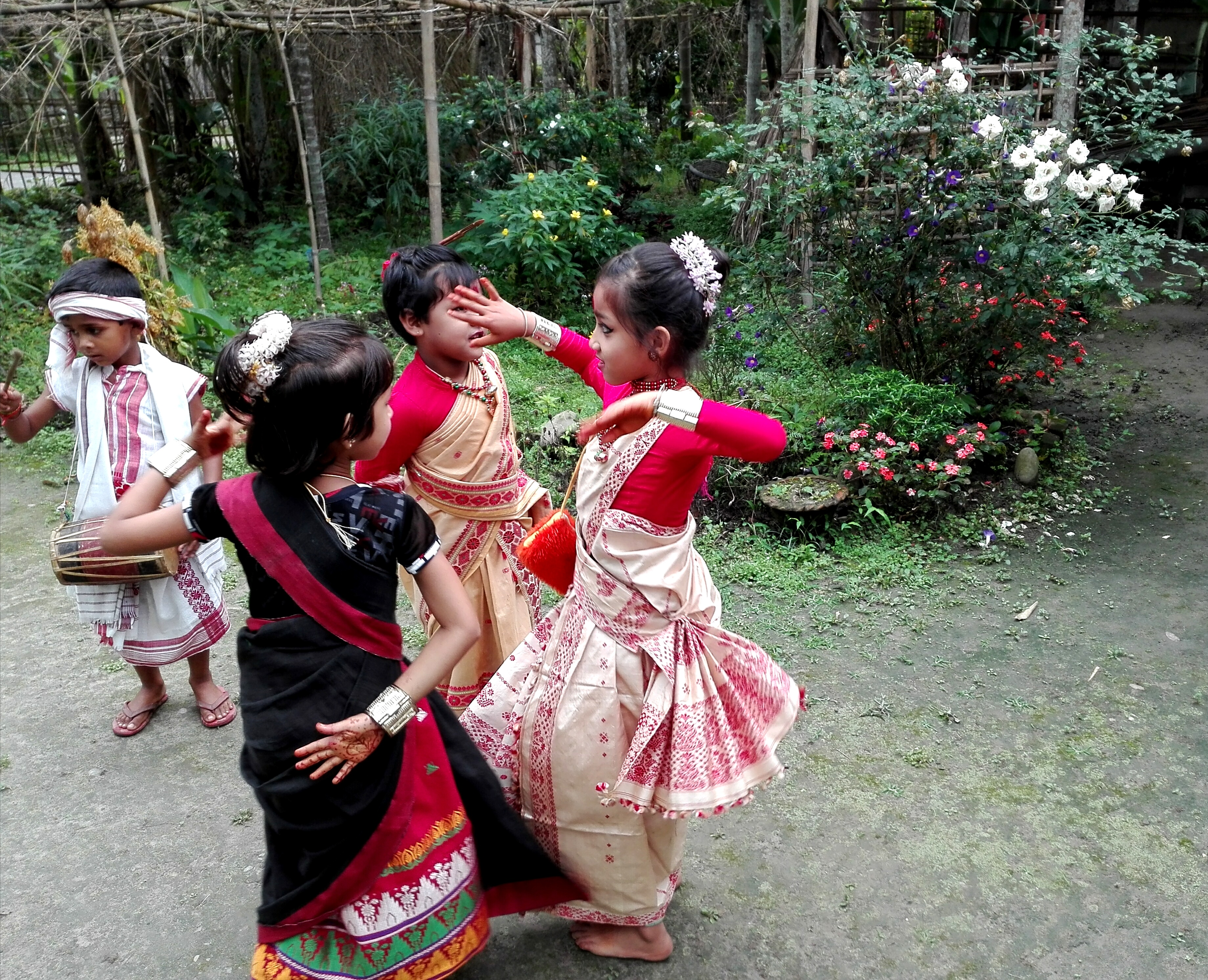
Children celebrating Bohag Bihu

The first day of Bohag bihu is called "Goru Bihu". Goru means cow. The first day is the bihu of cows and buffaloes. Goru bihu is related to the agricultural roots of Assam in rural areas. The day is dedicated to caring and upkeep of cattle (the wealth generator of farmers). Cows (sacred animal in Hinduism) are bathed and smeared with turmeric and pulses near pond, and are worshiped as part of the festivities by Assamese Hindu agriculturalists throughout Assam.

=== Ambubachi Mela ===
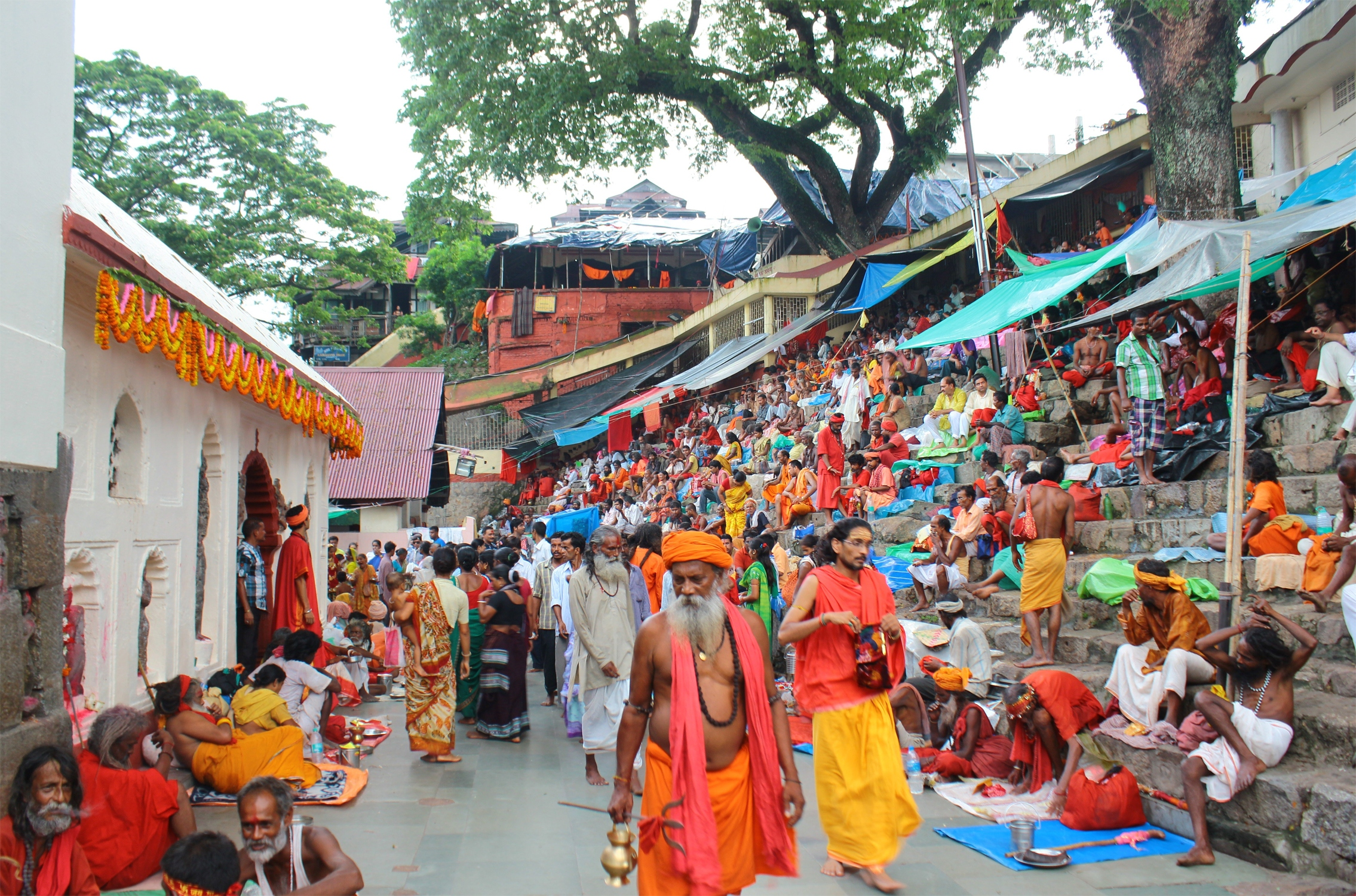
Sadhus gathered at Kamakhya Temple for the Ambubachi Mela

During Ambubachi Mela, hindu sages from all over India assemble in the temple to get blessings of Maa Kamakhya and uplift their knowledge Tantra Sadhana, which is known by the local name of "Tantra Mantra". Kamakhya is centre of Tantric worship.

=== Bathou puja (worship) ===
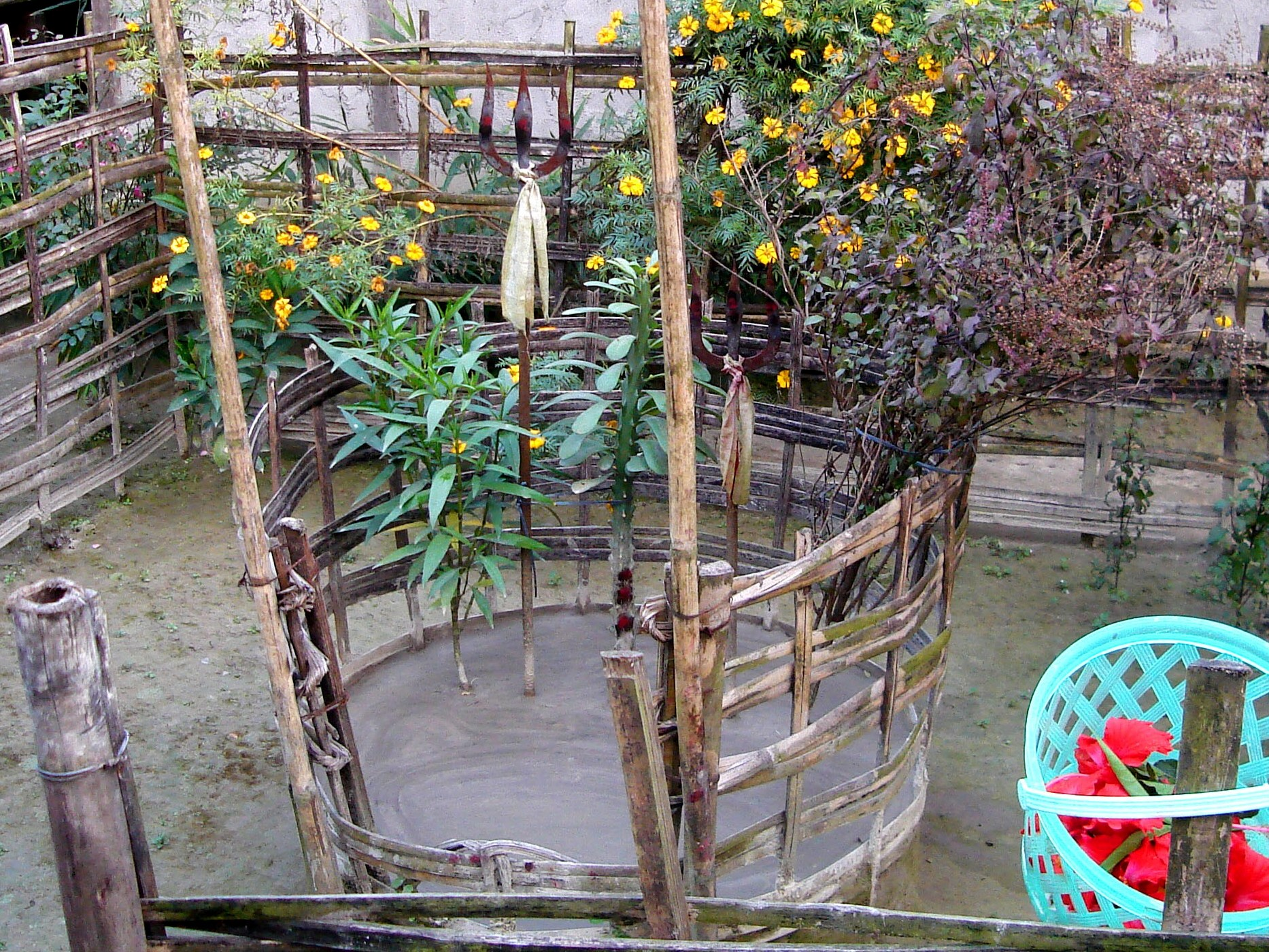
The Boro people consider this cactus to be holy. They call it 'Bathow Bwrai' or Lord Shiva.

Bathow Puja is an important religious festival of the Bodo-Kacharies of Assam, India. In this festival, indigenous bodo people worship a god known by different names like Gila Damra, Khuria Bwrai, Sri Brai (Shib bwrai), Bathow Bwrai etc. Among these festivals, Kherai is the most significant and important.

== Temples ==
=== Hajo ===
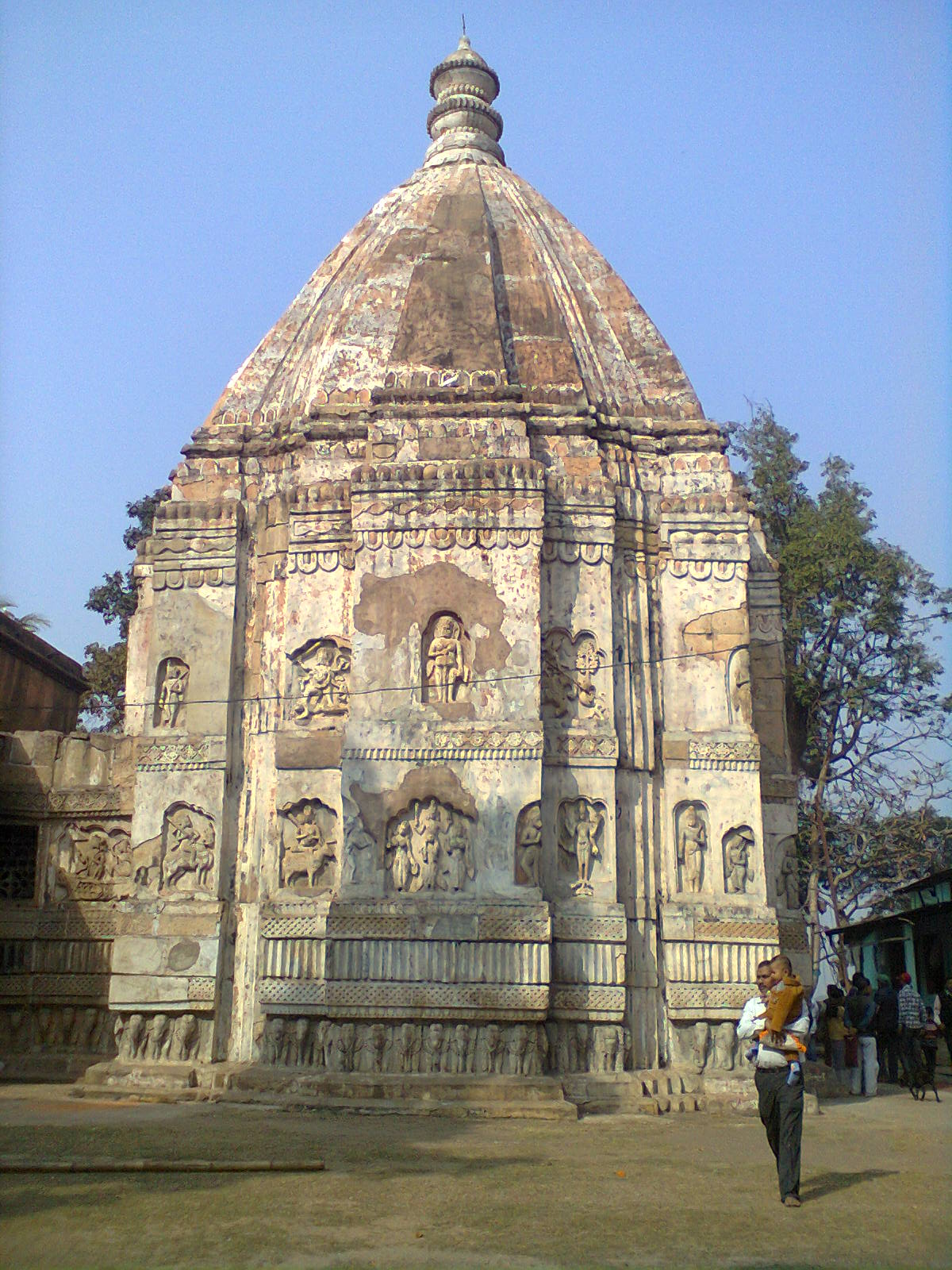
Hayagriva Madhava Temple, Hajo

Hajo is a historic town set in the hills northwest of Guwahati, Assam, India. It is a sacred place for Hindus as a pilgrimage site. To the Hindus of Assam and world over, the Manikut Parbat of Hajo is the site of the 10th-century temple ruins and the 11th- to 16th-century temples complex for Vaishnavism as well as shrines of Shaivism and Shaktism.

=== Navagraha Temple ===
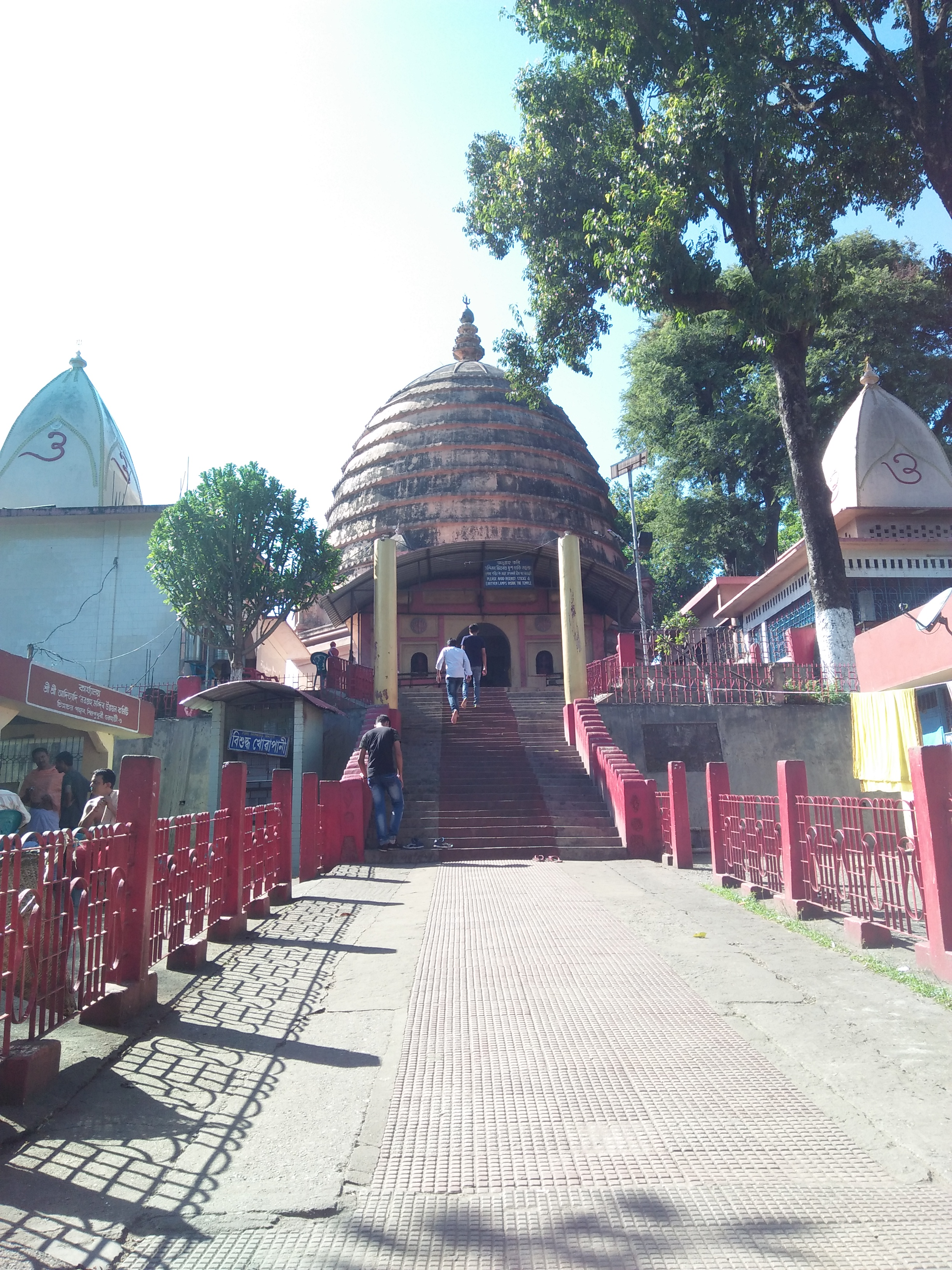
Navagraha Temple, Guwahati (the second most important temple after Kamakhya)

Navagraha temple are an important pilgrimage sites devoted to Navagraha—the nine (nava) major celestial bodies (Grahas) meaning planets of Hindu astronomy. The temple is made up of stones. These celestial bodies are named Surya means (Sun), Chandra means (Moon), Mangala means (Mars), Budha means (Mercury), Brihaspati means (Jupiter), Shukra means (Venus), Shani means (Saturn), Rahu means (North Lunar Node) and Ketu means (South Lunar Node). Many temples in Southern parts of India contain a shrine dedicated to the Navagrahas (nine planets). However, the term Navagraha temples refers to a cluster of nine separate temples, each an abode of one of the Navagrahas.

=== Basistha temple ===
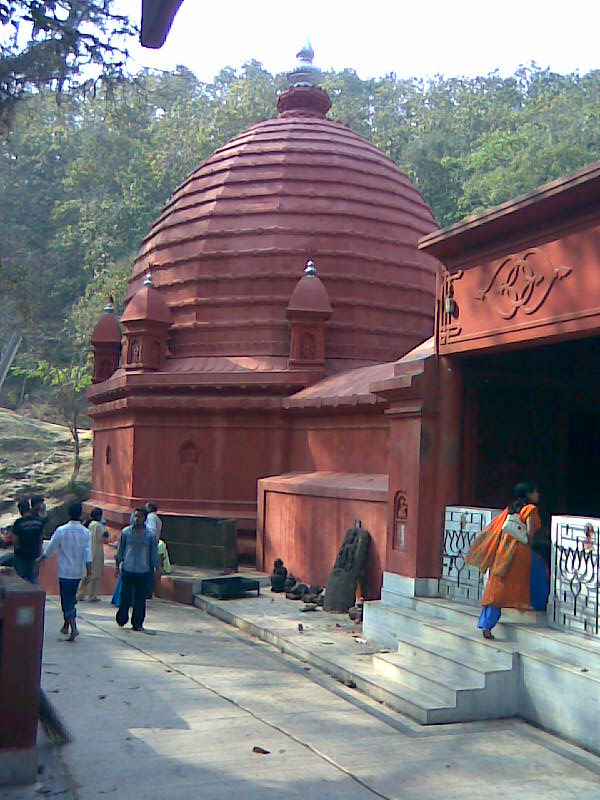
Basistha temple, third most important Hindu temple after Kamakhya and Navagraha temples

Basistha Temple is located in the south-east corner of Guwahati city, Assam and is a Shaiva mandir. The history of the Basistha Ashram where the temple is located dates back to the Vedic age. According to legend the ashram was founded by the great saint Basistha muni (Vasishtha). Temple in the ashram stands on the bank of the mountain streams originating from the hills of Meghalaya, which becomes the rivers Basistha and Bahini/Bharalu flowing throughout the city.

=== Umananda temple ===
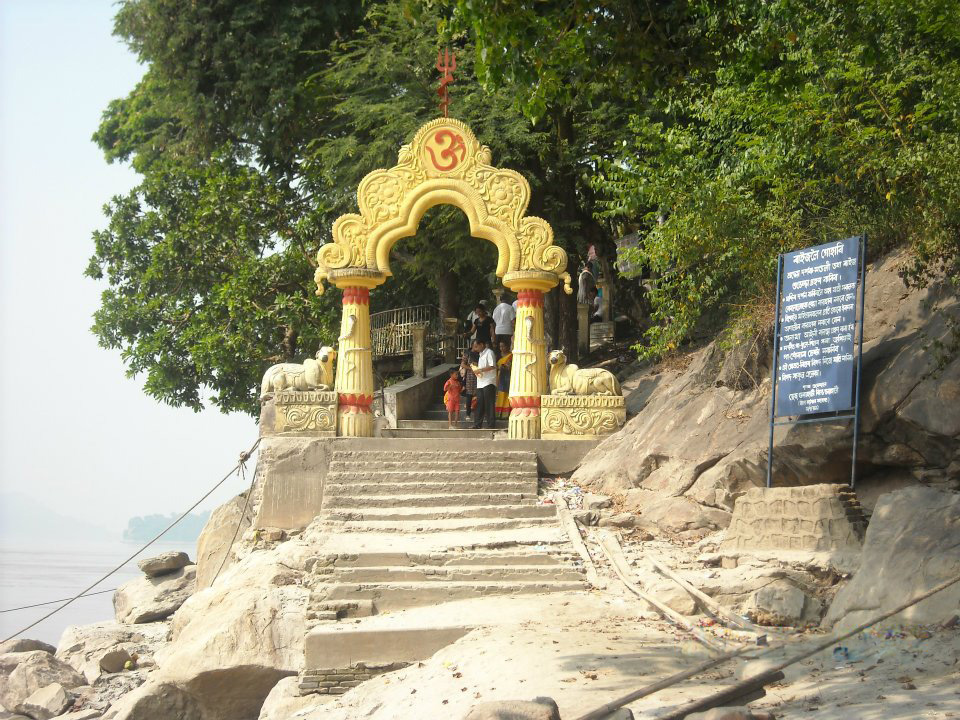
Umananda island temple of Assam

"Umananda" the smallest river island is located in the midst of river Brahmaputra flowing through the city of Guwahati in Assam. The British named the island Peacock Island for its structure. This temple is dedicated to Hindu deity Lord Shiva. According to Hindu mythology, Lord Shiva created the island for his wife Parvati's happiness and pleasure. Shiva is said to have resided here in the form of Bhayananda. According to a myth in Kalika Purana, Shiva burnt Kamadeva with his third eye on Umananda when he interrupted Shiva's deep meditation, hence the Island is also known as Bhasmachal. Maha Shivaratri is widely celebrated in Umananda. Monday is considered to be the holiest day in the temple and the new moon brings bliss to the hindu pilgrims.

=== Sukreshwar mandir ===
Sukreswar Mandir

The Sukreswar Temple is an important Shiva temple which was built in 1744 year by Ahom King Pramatta Singha. Leading down from the temple compound is a long flight of steps to the Brahmaputra River from where one can view the picturesque Umananda Island temple, the smallest river Island in the world. The temple is located on the Sukreswar or Itakhuli hill on the south bank of river Brahmaputra in the Panbazar locality of Guwahati city.

=== Dirgeshwari temple ===
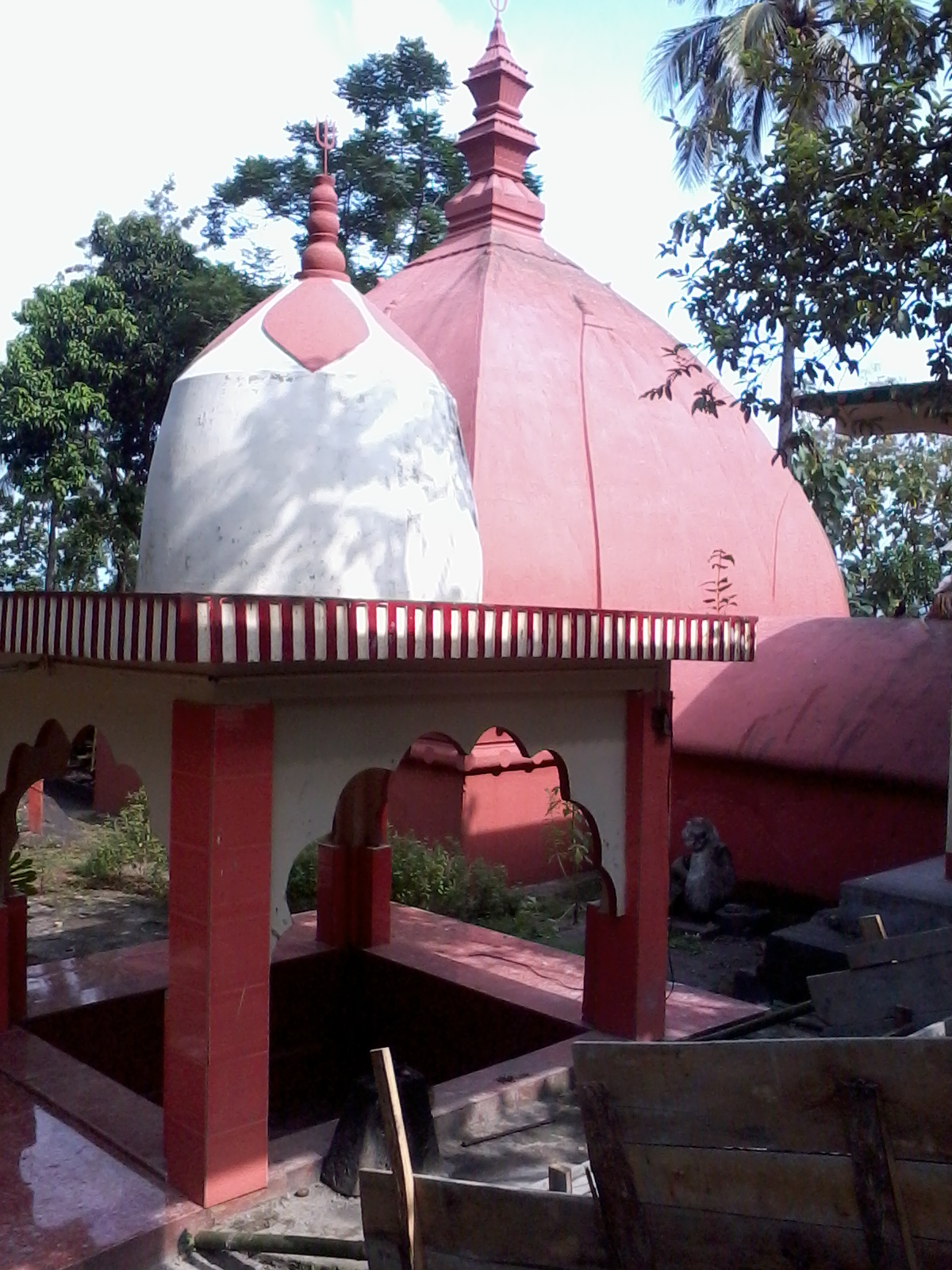
Image representing Dirgeshwari Mata Mandir

Dirgheswari Mandir is a temple situated in the northern banks of the river Brahmaputra River in Guwahati, Assam. Many ancient images depicting Hindu deities made on rocks existed along with the temple. Brick temple were made by Ahom king Swargadeo Siva Singha, Dirgheswari temple is considered as a Shakta pitha for Shakti Worship. The main attraction of Dirgheswari temple is the annual Durga Puja celebrations, in which hindu devotees from far of places come to attend.

== Demography ==
Assam Hindu population (1901–2011)
| Year | State population | Hindu Population | Percentage |
|---|---|---|---|
| 1901 | 3,289,680 | 2,781,424 | 84.55 |
| 1911 | 3,848,617 | 3,201,664 | 83.19 |
| 1921 | 4,636,980 | 3,726,277 | 80.36 |
| 1931 | 5,560,371 | 4,214,761 | 75.8 |
| 1941 | 6,694,790 | 4,131,355 | 74.3 |
| 1951 | 8,028,856 | 5,682,824 | 70.78 |
| 1961 | 10,837,329 | 7,731,350 | 71.34 |
| 1971 | 14,625,152 | 10,604,697 | 72.51 |
| 1981 | 18,041,248 | 12,578,358 | 69.72 |
| 1991 | 22,414,322 | 15,048,975 | 67.14 |
| 2001 | 26,655,528 | 17,296,772 | 64.89 |
| 2011 | 31,205,576 | 19,180,759 | 61.47 |

A part of Hinduism's percentage decline in Assam is due to lower fertility rates compared to the Muslim population and illegal immigration of Bangladeshis in Assam since from the late 1900s. Assam's total fertility rate is 1.9 according to NFHS-5. The rate is below the replacement rate of 2.1. In NFHS-3, which was conducted in 2005–06, Hindus in Assam had fertility rates of 1.95 respectively. By 2019–20, NFHS-5 showed Hindu fertility rate have fallen to 1.6.

=== Population by district (2011 year) ===
Below is a breakdown of the Hindu population by district in the Indian state of Assam according to the 2011 Census of India. Hindus are majority in 18 districts out of 29 in Assam.

| District | Total population | Hindu population | Percentage |
|---|---|---|---|
| Baksa | 950,075 | 782,901 | 82.4% |
| Barpeta | 1,693,622 | 492,966 | 29.11% |
| Bongaigaon | 738,804 | 359,145 | 48.61% |
| Cachar | 1,736,617 | 1,038,985 | 59.83% |
| Chirang | 482,162 | 320,647 | 66.50% |
| Darrang | 928,500 | 327,322 | 35.25% |
| Dhemaji | 686,133 | 655,052 | 95.47% |
| Dhubri | 1,949,258 | 388,380 | 19.92% |
| Dibrugarh | 1,326,335 | 1,198,401 | 90.35% |
| Dima Hasao | 214,102 | 143,593 | 67.07% |
| Goalpara | 1,008,183 | 347,878 | 34.51% |
| Golaghat | 1,066,888 | 917,426 | 85.99% |
| Hailakandi | 659,296 | 251,194 | 38.1% |
| Jorhat | 1,092,256 | 1,008,219 | 92.31% |
| Kamrup | 1,517,542 | 877,495 | 57.82% |
| Kamrup Metropolitan | 1,253,938 | 1,064,412 | 84.89% |
| Karbi Anglong | 956,313 | 766,000 | 80.1% |
| Karimganj | 1,228,686 | 521,962 | 42.48% |
| Kokrajhar | 887,142 | 529,068 | 59.64% |
| Lakhimpur | 1,042,137 | 797,130 | 76.49% |
| Morigaon | 957,423 | 451,882 | 47.2% |
| Nagaon | 2,823,768 | 1,225,246 | 43.39% |
| Nalbari | 771,639 | 491,582 | 63.71% |
| Sivasagar | 1,151,050 | 1,007,277 | 87.51% |
| Sonitpur | 1,924,110 | 1,422,824 | 73.95% |
| Tinsukia | 1,327,929 | 1,181,347 | 88.96% |
| Udalguri | 831,668 | 612,425 | 73.64% |
| Hojai | 931,218 | 424,065 | 45.53% |
| South Salmara district | 249,508 | 4,589 | 1.84% |
| Assam (Total) | 31,205,576 | 19,180,759 | 61.47% |

== Conflict and Tensions ==
=== Tensions against Hindu Marwaris ===
32 local groups in Assam are demanding protection of Assamese rights, seeking to preserve the state's culture and interests. Loud music during Hindu festivals like Holi and BolBom (Bolbam Dham) has been requested to be stopped by the demonstrators, targeting the non-Assamese community and also advocating for 100% job reservation for Assamese people in Dibrugarh district. The groups have also raised other demands to safeguard the rights and identity of the Assamese community.

A 17-year-old girl's alleged assault in Assam's Sivasagar sparked protests against "non-Assamese" business owners, escalating into threats from militant group ULFA(I) and a public apology from Marwari representatives kneeling down begging for forgiveness; though the deed of some particular person was generalised to the whole community. Two local Marwari businessmen have been arrested in connection with the assault, which fueled resentment against "non-Assamese" residents and business owners. A protest by 30 Assamese nationalist groups began on Monday, shutting down shops and businesses owned by "non-Assamese" residents. A meeting was held on Tuesday, led by State Cabinet Minister Ranoj Pegu, with representatives from both Assamese nationalist and Marwari groups to address the issue.

=== Past riots against Bengali Hindus ===
The "Bongal Kheda" campaign of the 1960s and 1970s primarily targeted Bengali Hindus, particularly those who were settled in Assam for generations and they are being called "Bongal", means outsiders. These individuals, many of whom had contributed significantly to the state's development, were caught in a web of ethnic and political tensions. During the campaign, these Bengali Hindus faced systematic persecution, which led to the forced migration of around 5 lakh people from Assam to Bengal. This violent displacement was a result of a concerted effort to drive out the Bengali-speaking community, with little regard for their deep-rooted connection to the land. In recent years, similar rhetoric has resurfaced, sparking fears that the struggles of Bengali Hindus in Assam are far from over, as they once again find themselves on the receiving end of exclusion and marginalization.

=== Past riots against Bihari Hindus ===
The 2003 attacks on Biharis in Assam were a series of violent incidents that led to 29 fatalities across various districts, with the violence largely attributed to the growing frustration among unemployed Assamese youth and the influence of militant groups. The attacks targeted Bihari migrants, with the United Liberation Front of Assam (ULFA) being suspected of orchestrating many of the killings, including the brutal murder of a family of six in Dibrugarh. The government responded by imposing curfews and deploying the military to maintain order, while local authorities used force to disperse violent mobs in Tinsukia. The violence highlighted the socio-political tensions in the region, exacerbated by ethnic divisions and unemployment, and left a lasting impact on Assamese-Bihari relations.

On 25 December 2022, members of the Veer Lachit Sena, a right-wing group in Assam, harassed two Bihari employees at a petrol pump in Guwahati. The incident began the previous day, when a verbal altercation between two Assamese customers and the petrol pump staff escalated into a physical fight. After the confrontation, one of the customers, Manjyoti Baruah, approached the Veer Lachit Sena, accusing the staff of mistreatment. The Sena responded by publicly humiliating two Bihari workers, forcing them to kneel and perform sit-ups, demanding that they "not touch Assamese people" again. The group’s leader, Bikash Baruah, claimed that the staff had attacked the Assamese customers, though the workers involved were not part of the altercation. The incident led to an outcry from the Bihari employees, who felt insecure and terrified. A petrol pump cashier, Shashi Singh, witnessed the events and reported that the attackers also instructed the workers that "not a single Bihari should be seen" in Assam. Following the incident, the police arrested 14 members of the Veer Lachit Sena for charges including causing voluntary harm. The two Bihari staff members involved in the initial altercation were also arrested, though they were later released. The police investigation revealed that the two Bihari workers had not participated in the fight. The incident raised concerns among the Bihari migrant workers in Assam about their safety and security, prompting calls for governmental intervention.

== Trends ==
Decadal growth of Hindus in Assam
| Year | Pop. | ±% |
|---|---|---|
| 1901 | 2,781,424 | — |
| 1911 | 3,201,664 | +15.1% |
| 1921 | 3,726,277 | +16.4% |
| 1931 | 4,214,761 | +13.1% |
| 1941 | 4,131,355 | −2.0% |
| 1951 | 5,682,824 | +37.6% |
| 1961 | 7,731,350 | +36.0% |
| 1971 | 10,604,697 | +37.2% |
| 1981 | 12,578,358 | +18.6% |
| 1991 | 15,048,975 | +19.6% |
| 2001 | 17,296,772 | +14.9% |
| 2011 | 19,180,759 | +10.9% |
Source: Census of India

The Hindu population in Assam have increased from 2.78 million in 1901 to 19.18 million in 2011 census (a growth of 16.4 million in 110 years). Hindus in Assam have a fertility rate of 1.6 in 2019–20. Between (2011–21) year for upcoming 2021 census of India, it was predicted that Hindu growth rate have fallen below 10 percent leading to a population growth of only 20.16 million in 2021 from 19.18 million which was the previous census results of 2011.

Hindu percentage by decades in Assam
| Year | Percent | Increase |
|---|---|---|
| 1901 | 84.55% | - |
| 1911 | 83.19% | ▼ -1.36% |
| 1921 | 80.36% | ▼ -2.83% |
| 1931 | 75.8% | ▼ -4.56% |
| 1941 | 74.3% | ▼ -1.5% |
| 1951 | 70.78% | ▼ -3.52% |
| 1961 | 71.34% | ▲ +0.56% |
| 1971 | 72.51% | ▲ +1.17% |
| 1981 | 69.72% | ▼ -2.79% |
| 1991 | 67.14% | ▼ -2.58% |
| 2001 | 64.89% | ▼ -2.25% |
| 2011 | 61.47% | ▼ -3.42% |

Assam's Hindu percentage has been steadily decreasing for over a century, though they experienced a slight rebound during the 1960s and 70s. The percentage of Hindus was 84.55% in 1901 and has declined to 61.47% in 2011 census, representing a decline of 23.08% in 110 years. The increase in the Hindu percentage during the period of 1961–1971 was mainly because of immigration of East Pakistan's Hindu refugees into the state.

=== Illegal Immigration ===
As per estimation, around 10 million Bangladeshis are staying illegally in Assam, of which around 2 million among them are Hindus who have entered Assam in droves during (1961-71) period and thereafter staying here, thus today constituting around 6.4 percent of the state population as per 2011 Census. If the illegal population are excluded through National Register of Citizens and are deported, then state total population will come down from 31.2 million to 21.2 million, and as a result the Hindu population will shift from 19.18 million (61.47%) to 17.18 million (81.04%) and the Muslim population with shift from 12.02 million (38.53%) to 4.02 million (18.96%) respectively.

=== Hindu population by Ethnic Group ===
Ethnicity of Assam Hindu population (2011 year)
| Ethnicity/Race | Hindu population |
|---|---|
| Assamese Caste Hindus (Kayastha, Brahmins and Vaishyas.) | 2,045,706 |
| Bengali Hindus (Majority in Barak Valley, while significant population also resides in mainland Brahmaputra Valley.) | 6,026,439 |
| Indigenous Tribal Hindus (Ahom, Bodo, Dimasa, Deori, Chutia, Karbi, Mishing, Hajong, Tea-garden community, Rabha, Deori, Moran, Tiwa etc.) | 8,192,417 |
| Hindu Immigrants from (Uttar Pradesh, Bihar, Nepal, Odisha, Punjab & Rajasthan.) | 2,916,197 |
| Total | 19,180,759 |

The Scheduled Tribes of Assam are mainly practitioners of Hindu faith. Of 38.84 lakh Scheduled Tribes counted in Assam in 2011, it was found that 33.50 lakh are Hindus; forming 86.24 percent of the ST population in the state. About 95% of the Ahom tribe, 90% of the Bodo tribe, 83% of the Karbi tribe, 99% of the Dimasa tribe, 94% of Rabha tribe, 97% of Mishing tribe are Hindu by faith.

== See also ==
- Demography of Assam
- Lokhimon, a Vaishnavism movement followed by the Karbi people of Northeast India
- Ahom religion
- Assamese people
- Bodo people
- Islam in Assam
- Christianity in Assam
- Bathouism
- Bengali Hindus in Assam
- Namghar
- Satra (Ekasarana Dharma)

== Bibliography ==
- Baruah, S L (1986), A Comprehensive History of Assam, Munshiram Manoharlal
- Misra, Udayon (1999). "Immigration and Identity Transformation in Assam". Economic and Political Weekly. 34 (21): 1264–1271. JSTOR 4407987.
- Saikia, Yasmin (2004). Fragmented Memories: Struggling to be Tai-Ahom in India. Duke University Press. ISBN 082238616X.
- Urban, Hugh (2016), "Assam and the Eastern States", in Jacobsen, Knut A. (ed.), Brill's Encyclopedia of Hinduism Online, doi:10.1163/2212-5019_BEH_COM_1010010010
