= Bagurumba =

Main traditional dance of Bodo people

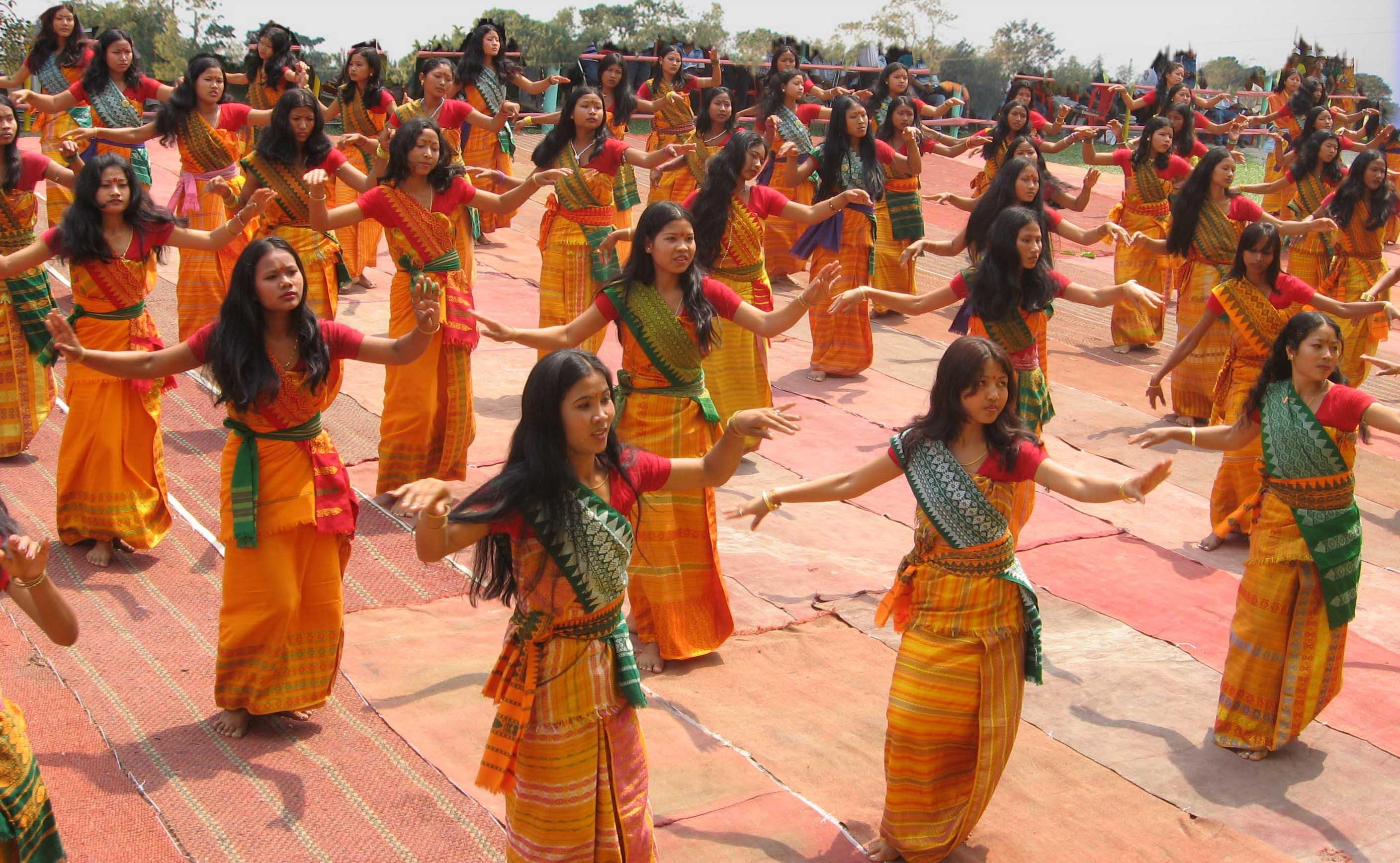
- Bodo girls dancing the Bagurumba dance
- Genre: Folk dance
- Inventor: Boro people
- Origin: Bodoland, Assam and Northeast India

The Bagurumba is a traditional dance of the indigenous Boro people living in the State of Assam and North East India. It is also called '''butterfly dance''' because it's personification of movements of butterflies and birds. In this occasion, only the Boro women perform the dance, wearing their colourful traditional attire dokhna, jwmgra (fasra) and aronai. The dance is accompanied by handmade percussion instruments such as 'kham' (a long cylindrical drum, made of wood and goat skin or other animal’s skin), sifung (flute, carved out of bamboo), jota (made of iron/tama), serja (a bowed instrument, made of wood and animals skin), and gongwna (made of bamboo), tharkha (a piece of split bamboo).

The Boro music may lack the sophistication of established schools and forms of music, however, the khams (a long cylindrical drum) provide the beats and the rhythm for the Bagurumba dance ensemble, while sifung (flute) and Serja provide melody, together used to 'invite' young people to the festivities or celebration. The Bagurumba dance resembles the gentle and poetic movements of the butterflies, is believed to be influenced/transpired by elements of the nature. The practice of this dance by the Boro people is over thousand years old. Usually, the Boro people live in peace and harmony with the green vegetation and the environment, and worship beauty of the nature. Boro people live and farm along the foothills of the eastern and southern Himalayas, which are evergreen forest. This traditional dance incorporates several symbolic elements, transpired by the natural surrounding environment. For example, dance of plants, dance of animals, birds, butterfly dance, wave of flowing river, wind etc.

Bagurumba Dance (Butterfly Dance of the Bodo People)

Because Bagurumba is an energetically choreographed youthful dance, Boro people are usually attracted or drawn to this ensemble. By watching this dance, most Boro people often sing along and dance.

There are no certain days and times to perform this dance; this dance is performed on many occasions, such as festivals and cultural programmes.

The origin and emergence of [Bagurumba] song remains unknown, likely written thousands of years ago. There are several competing interpretations, however, the common theme is that the Bagururmba song and dance signify mutual respect, to honour friendship, to honour relationship, and to live in peace with the environment. Bagurumba is a celebration of life, youthful expression of happiness and togetherness.

== Musical instruments ==
Among many different musical instruments, the Bodos use for Bagurumba Dance:

Sifung: This is a long bamboo flute having five holes rather than six as the north Indian Bansuri would have and is also much longer than it, producing a much lower tone.

- Serja: a violin-like instrument. It has a round body and the scroll is bent forward.
- kham : a long drum made of wood and goat skin.
- Jota: made of iron/tama.
- Gongwna: made of bamboo.

== Composition ==
Bagurumba uses F Major Pentatonic Scale, exactly similar to Chinese Traditional Music, an indication of the ancient Chinese influence.

== See also ==
- Folk dances of Assam
- Bodo people
- Bathow Puja

== Books ==
- Bordoloi, B.N. (1987). Tribes if Assam Part I (PDF).
- Devi, Premalata (1994). Social and Religious institutions of Boros (PDF).
