= Bathou Puja =

Religious festival of the Bodo-Kacharies of Assam, India

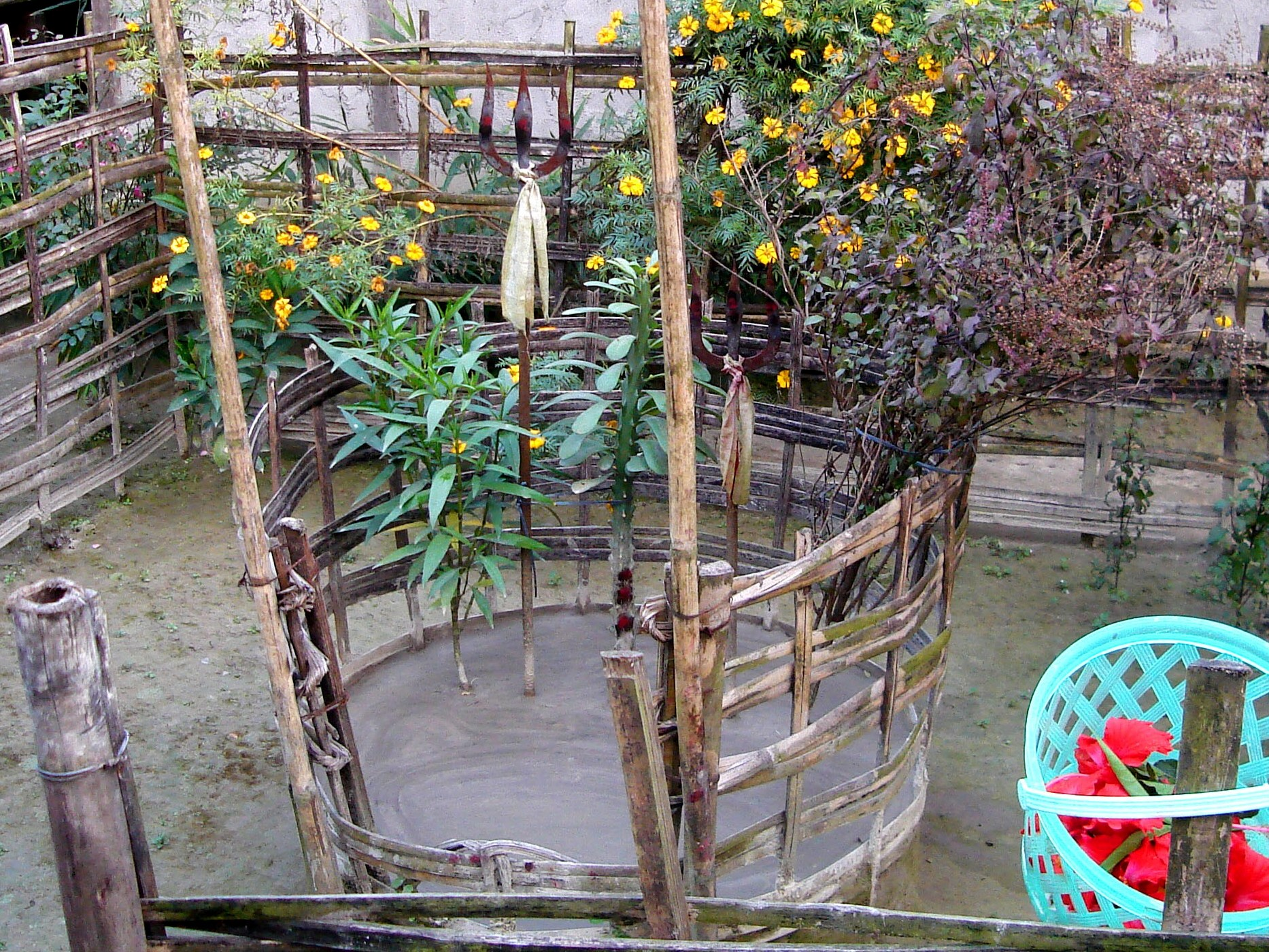
- Official name: Gwthar Bathou San
- Observed by: Bodo people
- Type: Ethnic, Religious
- Significance: Worship of Bathoubwrai, the supreme deity of Bathouism
- Celebrations: Ritual prayers, offerings, community feasts, traditional music and dance
- Related to: Bathouism, Kherai Puja, Bwisagu

Bathou Puja or Bathow Puja officially Gwthar Bathou San is a traditional religious ritual associated with Bathouism, the indigenous faith of the Bodo people of Assam, India. The ceremony is performed in honour of Bathoubwrai (also known as Bwrai Bathou), regarded as the supreme deity in the Bathou religion.

The ritual represents one of the most significant religious practices of the Bodo community and reflects their traditional worldview centred on nature worship and harmony with the natural environment. Bathou Puja is widely observed in regions of Assam where Bodo populations are concentrated, particularly in districts under Bodoland Territorial Region such as Kokrajhar, Udalguri, Baksa, Chirang and Tamulpur.

In recognition of its cultural importance, the Government of Assam has declared the second Tuesday of the traditional month of Magh as a state holiday in connection with Bathou Puja celebrations.

== Etymology ==
The word Bathou originates from the Bodo language and is derived from two words: Ba meaning “five” and thou meaning “deep philosophical thought”. The concept symbolically represents the five fundamental elements believed to constitute the universe: air, sun, earth, fire and sky.

These five elements are regarded as the spiritual and material basis of existence in the Bathou belief system, forming the philosophical foundation of Bathou worship and ritual practice.

== Background ==
Bathouism is considered the traditional and ancestral religion of the Bodo people, one of the largest indigenous ethnic groups in northeastern India. Historically, the religion developed as a nature-centric belief system that emphasised the worship of natural forces and the spiritual significance of the environment.

For centuries, Bathou beliefs were transmitted primarily through oral traditions, rituals, and community customs rather than written scriptures. Despite the influence of other religions such as Hinduism and Christianity among sections of the Bodo population, Bathou Puja continues to play an important role in preserving indigenous religious traditions.

In recent years, the Bodoland Territorial Region government and various cultural organisations have taken initiatives to preserve Bathou religious practices and to recognise Bathouism as a distinct indigenous faith.

== Description ==
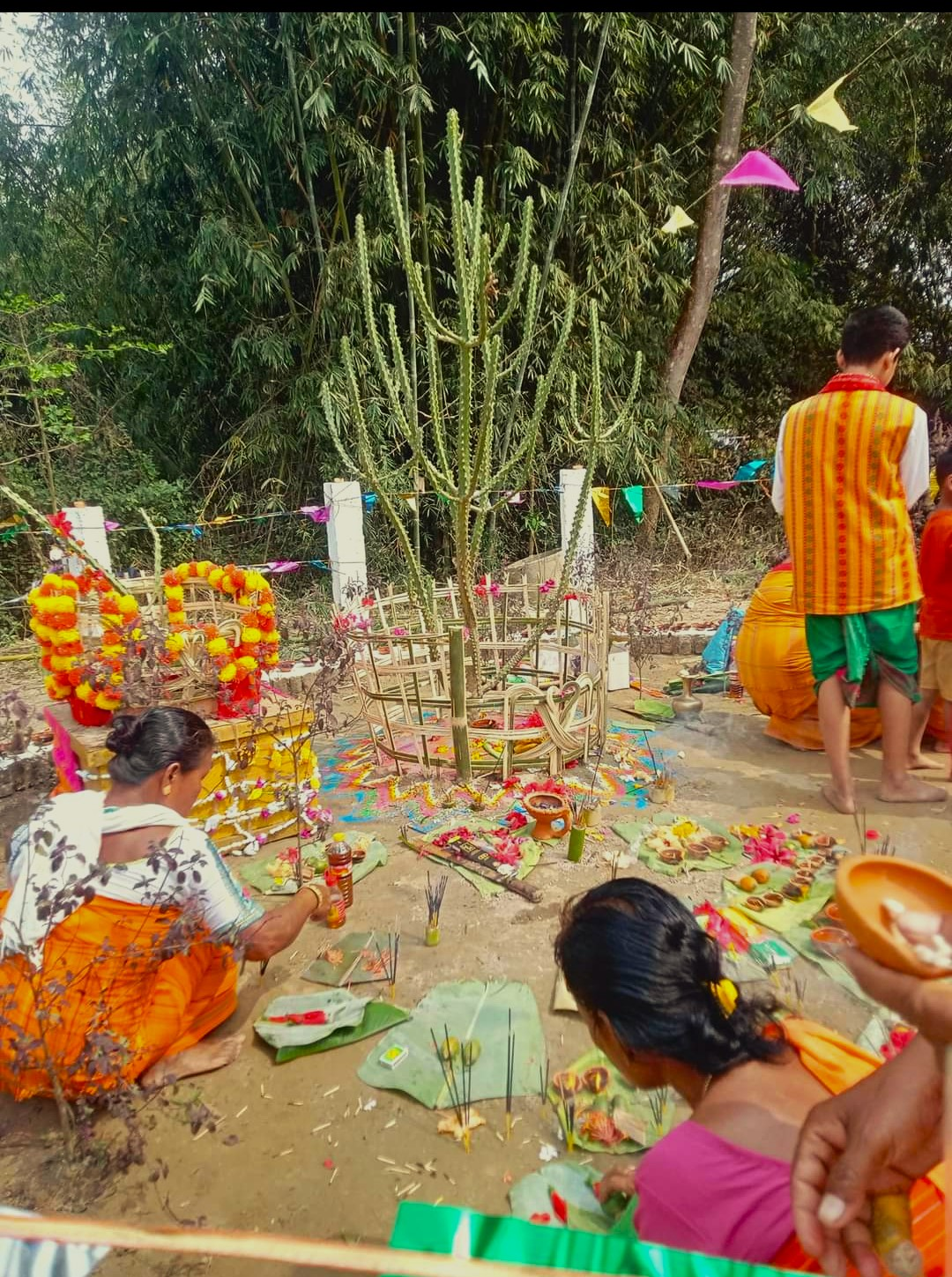
Bathou Puja

Central to Bathou worship is the belief in Bathoubwrai, the supreme creator and protector of the universe. The deity is often understood as the spiritual embodiment of the five elements that constitute the cosmos.

A distinctive feature of Bathou worship is the use of the sacred Sijou plant (Euphorbia neriifolia), which is regarded as the living symbol of Bathoubwrai. The plant is usually placed at the centre of a sacred altar and enclosed by a bamboo fence known as the Bathou altar.

The bamboo enclosure traditionally consists of eighteen pairs of bamboo strips tied with five horizontal bands, symbolising the five fundamental principles of life: birth, marriage, sorrow, happiness, and death.

== Rituals ==
Bathou Puja is typically performed at a sacred site known as the Bathou Thansali or Bathou altar. The ceremony is conducted by religious specialists known as the Deori (male priest) and Deodhoni (female priestess).

The rituals involve the offering of flowers, rice, betel nuts, incense, and traditional rice beer known as zou. Devotees gather around the altar to offer prayers seeking peace, prosperity, protection from illness, and agricultural prosperity.

In some traditional contexts, animal sacrifices such as fowls or goats may be offered depending on local customs and community practices.

The ceremony is also accompanied by traditional Bodo music, dances, and communal feasts, which reinforce social unity and collective identity among the participants.

== Types of Bathou worship ==
Bathou religious practice includes several different ritual forms performed for specific purposes. Among the most notable are:

- Kherai Puja – considered the most elaborate and sacred Bathou ritual, involving ritual dance and trance performed by priestesses.
- Garja Puja – performed collectively to ward off evil spirits or natural calamities affecting the community.
- Marai Puja – conducted for the welfare and prosperity of the village community.

These rituals are often held in village prayer grounds and involve the participation of large sections of the community.

== Cultural significance ==
Bathou Puja plays a central role in preserving the cultural identity of the Bodo people. The festival provides an opportunity for communities to gather, perform traditional rituals, and transmit cultural knowledge to younger generations.

In contemporary times, Bathou Puja has also become an important symbol of indigenous identity and cultural revival among the Bodo community.

Efforts by community organisations such as the All Bathou Mahasabha aim to promote awareness and safeguard the traditions associated with Bathou worship.

== See also ==
- Bathouism
- Bodo people
- Kherai Puja
- Bwisagu
- Religion in Assam
