= Folk dances of Assam =

Folk dances of Assam include the Bihu and the Bagurumba (both danced during festivals held in the spring), the Bhortal, the Ojapali dance. Assam is home to many groups: Muslim (Maria, Deshi, Gauria etc), Indo-Aryan, Rabha, Bodo, Dimasa, Karbi, Mising, Sonowal Kacharis, Mishmi and Tiwa (Lalung) etc. These cultures come together to create an Assamese culture. Residents of the state of Assam are known as "Axomiya" (Assamese). Most tribes have their own language, although Assamese is the primary language of the state.

Many fairs and festivals are held in Assam. Nearly all tribal festivals are held in spring and celebrate cultivation or harvest. Among festivals in Assam, the Bihu is most noteworthy; it brings together all Assamese people, regardless of background.

== Bihu dances ==
Although the origins of Bihu dance (Assamese: বিহু নৃত্য) are unknown, the first official record of it is said to be when the Ahom king Rudra Singha invited Bihu dancers to perform at the Rang Ghar fields in about 1694 for the Rongali Bihu.

=== Description ===
The Bihu is a group dance in which men and women dance together, but maintain separate gender roles. In general, women follow stricter line or circle formations. The male dancers and musicians enter the dancing area first, maintain their lines and follow synchronized patterns. When the female dancers enter, the male dancers break up their lines to mingle with the female dancers (who maintain their stricter formation and the order of the dance). It is usually characterized by specific postures: movements of the hips, arms and wrists; twirls, squats and bends. Male and female dance movements are very similar, with only subtle differences.

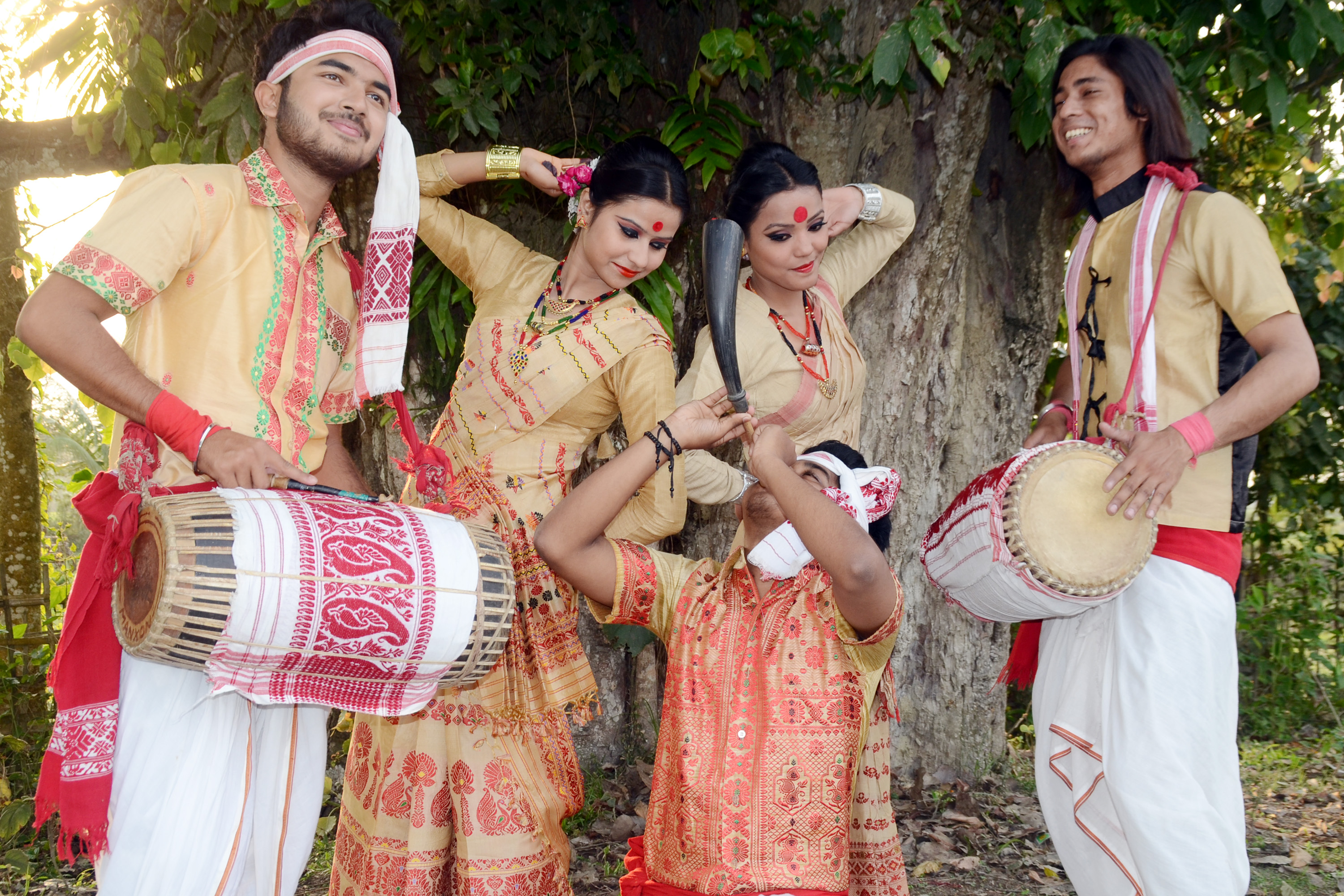
Bihu dance.

=== Performance ===
The dance is performed to traditional Bihu music. The most important musicians are the drummers (dhulia), who play a twin-faced drum (the dhol, which is hung from the neck) with one stick and a palm. There are usually more than one dhulia in a performance; each plays different rhythms at different sections of the performance. These rhythmic compositions, called seus, are traditionally formal. Before entering the dancing area, the drummers play a short and brisk rhythm. The seu is changed, and the drummers usually enter the dance area in line. The mohor xingor pepa is played (usually at the beginning) by a single player, who lays out an initial plaintive motif which sets the mood for the dance. The male dancers then enter the area in formation and perform (accompanied by singing, in which all participate). Other instruments which accompany this dance are the taal, a type of cymbal; the gogona, a reed-and-bamboo instrument; the toka, a bamboo clapper and the xutuli, a clay whistle. Bamboo flutes are also often used. The songs (bihu geet) accompanying the dance have been handed down for generations. Subjects of the lyrics include welcoming the Assamese new year, describing the life of a farmer, history and satire. Although men and women perform Bihu dance, the female Bihu dance has more variations (including freehand, twisting, with a rhythmic pepa, with a kahi (traditional metal plate) and with a jaapi (Assamese conical woven hat). The performance may be long, but is enlivened by rapid changes in rhythm, mood, movements, pace and improvisation. Dancers and musicians are given opportunities to showcase their talents.

=== Types ===
The dance takes several forms in the different northeastern Indian groups (e.g. the Deori Bihu dance, Mising Bihu dance or Rati Bihu celebrated by Morans). However, the underlying goal of the dance remains the same: to express the desire to feel both pain and happiness.

== Sattriya dance ==
A dance form of Assam performed in Tols or Namghar by both men and women separately. Sattriya dance is one of eight dance styles of India recognized as classical dance by the Sangeet-Natak Academy. The word Sattriya comes from the word Satra. On 15 nov, 2000, The Sangeet-Natak Academy recognized Sattriya dance as one of the classical dances of India.

== Jhumura ==
Jhumura is a class of Sattriya dance. Jhumura is also a type of play written by Madhavdeva. He plays " Chordhara", "Pimpora Gusuwa", "Bhoomi Leta" and "Bhojan Bihar" are called Jhumura. The dance in Madhava's Jhumura is called Jhumura Dance. The dance is performed in The Satras of Kamalabari, Jarabari, Belguri etc. in Assam. There are many types of Jhumura dances like "Ramadani", "Geetar Nach", "Mela Nach".

== Bagurumba Dance ==
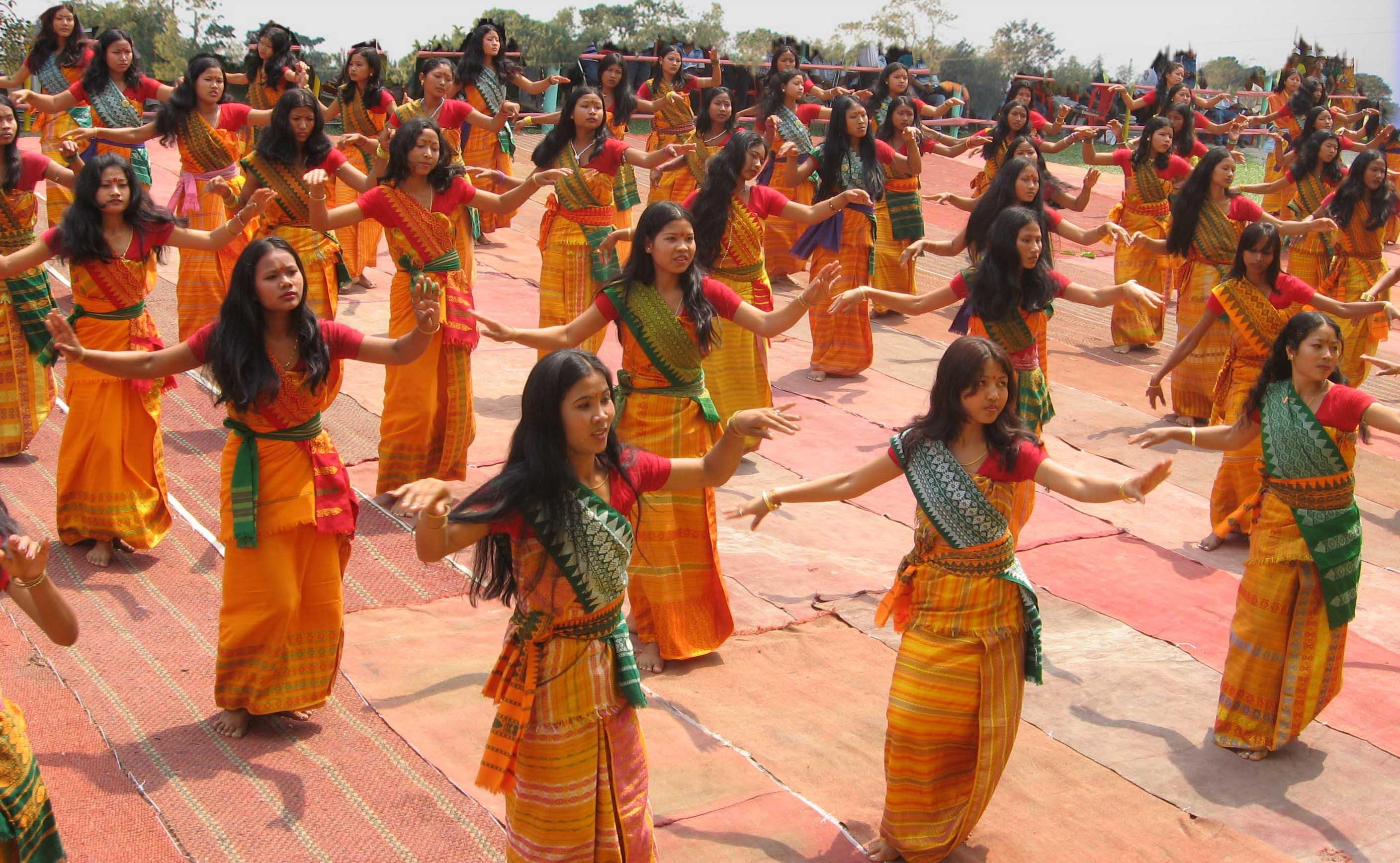
Bagurumba, a dance performed by Bodo girls.

Bagurumba is a folk dance in Assam which is performed by the Bodos. It is the usually practiced during Bwisagu, a Bodo festival in the Vishuva Sankranti (mid-April). Bwisagu begins with cow worship; then, young people reverentially bow down to their parents and elders.

After that, Bathow is worshiped by offering the deity chicken and zou (rice beer). Bodo women wearing colourful dokhna and aronai perform the Bagurumba dance (also known as the Bardwisikhla dance). It is accompanied by instruments such as the serja (a bowed instrument), sifung (flute), tharkha (split bamboo), kham or madal (long drum, made of wood and goatskin). The festival ends with a community prayer at Garjasali. This dance is performed in the Bodo-inhabited areas of Udalguri, Kokrajhar, Baksa, Chirang, Bongaigaon, Nalbari, Darrang and Sonitpur Districts.

== Bhortal dance ==
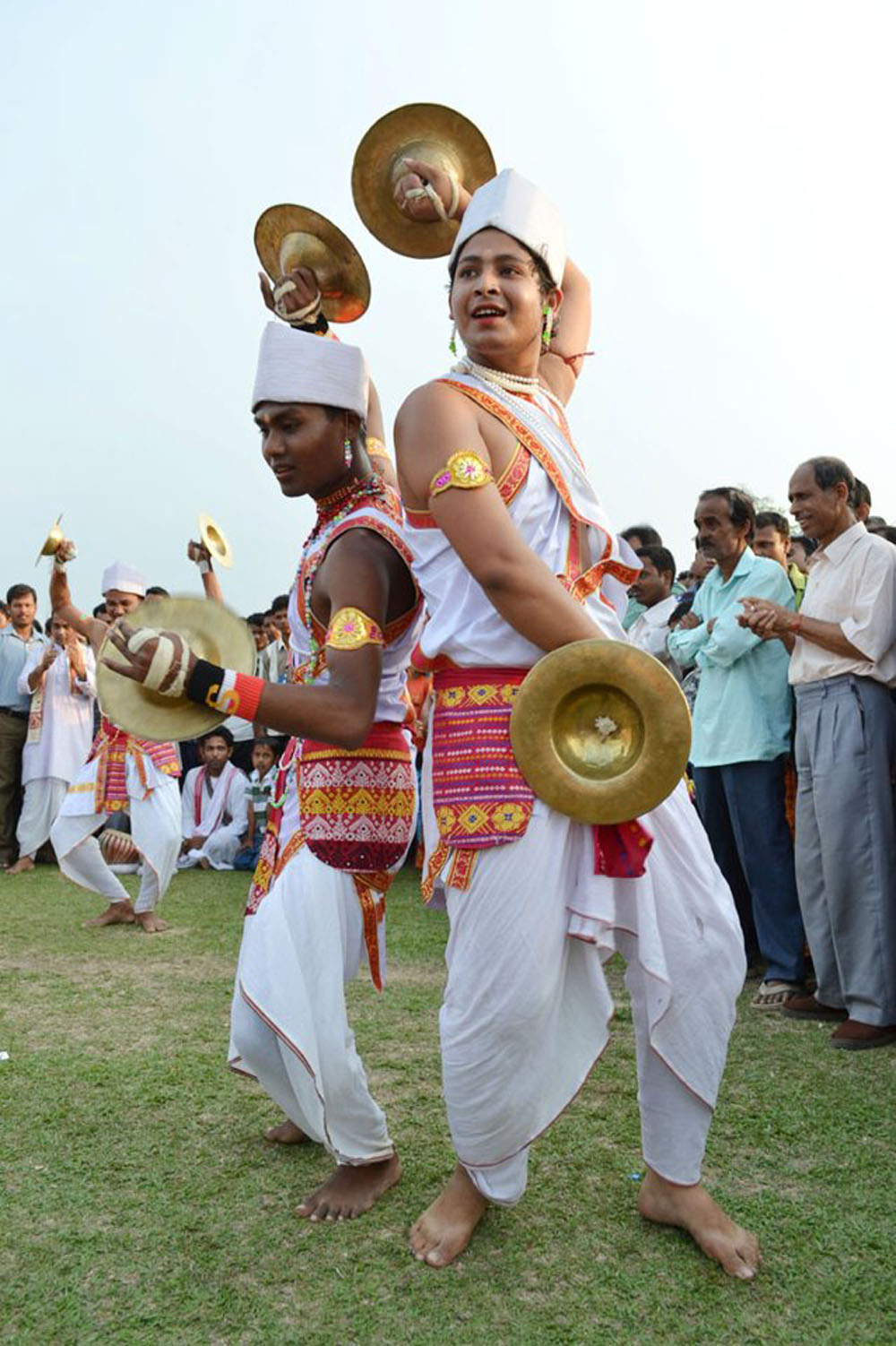
Bhortal dance.

Bhortal Nritya is known to have developed by Narahari Burha Bhakat. He was a well-known Satriya artist. This Bhortal Nritya of Barpeta district is said to have derived from the classical dance form of the state. This is one of the most popular dances in the state of Assam.

Performance— this dance is performed in a group. Six or seven dancers generally present the Bhortal dance of Assam together. This dance can be performed in larger groups as well. It is performed to a very fast beat. This beat is known as ‘Zhiya Nom’. The dancers are equipped with cymbals while performing this dance. The use of the cymbals makes the dance presentation appear very colorful. The dance movements are designed as such that they can produce some very colorful patters. This is the uniqueness of this dance from Assam.

== Jhumur dance ==
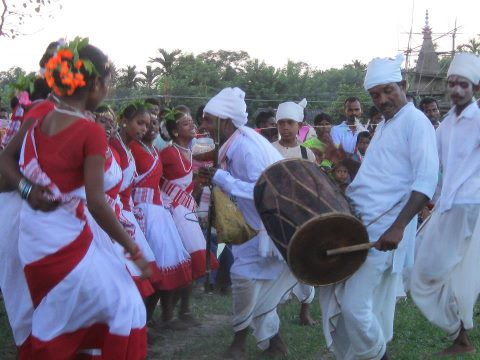
Jhumur dance.

Jhumur is a traditional dance form of "Adivasi" or Tea tribes community of Assam. The dance is performed by young girls and boys together. The male members wear long traditional dresses and keep the rhythm with few traditional musical instruments, generally a Dhol or Mandar, hung on shoulders, a flute and a pair of "Taal" (two metallic discs). The girls mostly perform the dancing part, holding each other's waist and moving hands and legs forward and backward synchronously. The dance has a huge following in the "Tea tribe" dominated districts of Assam, like Udalguri, Sonitpur, Golaghat, Jorhat, Sivasagar, Dibrugarh and Tinsukia .

== Deodhani Dance ==
Deodhani is an ancient dance of Assam. It was the medium of worship of the ancient Shakti religion. In this dance, a dancer dances continuously to appease the goddess by eating the raw blood and flesh of animals offered to the goddess. This Deodhani dance plays an important role in the worship of Tamreswari or Kechaikhati, Manashadevi etc.

== Ojapali Nritya ==
Oja-Pali is a classic dance form of Assam. Oja-Pali are actually the groups of chorus singers and dancers, with Oja as the leader and Palis as his assistants. A total of three or four Palis may be required for the dance and the principal one among them is called the Daina Pali. Apart from dancing, they also sing and play small cymbals, relating stories from the epics and Puranas. There is a typical pattern of dressing for the Ojas as well. He has to wear a pag-jama or a ghuri, along with bangles, unti, ring and nupur and also has to tie a tangali. The Oja-Pali dance is again subdivided into three types-

1. Vyasageet Oja
2. Suknarayani Oja
3. Ramayani Oja

== Devadasi Dance ==
An endangered dance performed by goddesses in some temples of Assam. In some ancient temples there was a class of dancers employed to appease the gods. They were known as Devadasi, that is, the servants of the Gods. The Hoygriva Madhav Temple in Hajo, The Parihareshwar Temple in Dubi near Bajali, The Shiva Temple in Negheriting, The Biswanath Temple in Sala, The Muktinath Shiv Daul in Rangpur and The Baidyanath Daul in Jaysagar are the most prominent.

== Thiyo Naam ==
Thiyo Naam is an ancient dance form of Assam. According to folklore, in the Dvapa era, King Bali gave the giants the name of Harinam Through physical labour. it is known that Mahapurusha Srimanta Sankardeva introduced the Thiyo naam on the basis of the same tradition. It is known as Thiyo Naam because it is performed standing. About 25 to 30 people are required to perform Thiyo Naam. According to the Shankari tradition, the Thiyo Naam originated at the Barpeta Satra. The Bhortal dance, derived from the Thiyo Naam, is also popular outside India. There is a tradition of singing this naam on the second day of Magh in Barpeta.

== Gumrag Dance ==
Gumrag is a notable dance of the Mishing people. This dance is usually performed in conjunction with the Ali-Ai-Ligang festival. After the daytime ceremony of Ali-Ai-Ligang, the Mishing youths dance the Gumrag in the evening. The colorful Customes woven by the participants are another spectacular accessory of the dance.
