= Ustad =

Honorific title used for a master in various languages of the Muslim world

Ustad, ustadh, ustaz or ustadz (abbreviated as Ust., Ut. or Ud.; from Persian: استاد, romanized: ustād) is an honorific title used in West Asia, North Africa, Central Asia, South Asia and Southeast Asia. It is used in various languages, including Persian, Arabic (as أستاذ ’ustāḏ), Azerbaijani, Urdu, Hindi, Bengali, Malayalam, Marathi, Bodo (as [ɔsthād]), Dhivehi, Punjabi, Pashto, Turkish, Kazakh, Uzbek, Indonesian, Malay and Kurdish.

== Etymology ==
The Persian word استاد (ustād) is from Middle Persian 𐫀𐫇𐫏𐫘𐫤𐫀𐫅 (awestād, 'master, craftsman').

== Usage ==
The title precedes the name and was historically usually used for well-regarded teachers and artists. It can be used for any sort of master of an art or occupation; for example, an acknowledged master motorcycle mechanic would be addressed as ustad. The term is also used by an apprentice (shagerd) for their teacher.

In Persian and in the Arabic-speaking world, it also refers to a university professor. Ustad is only used for qualified Islamic scholars in Brunei, Indonesia, Malaysia, the Philippines, Singapore, Southern Thailand where it is a direct equivalent of terms such as shaykh in the Arab world, and mawlānā in the Indian subcontinent. In the Maldives, the title al-usthaadh (އަލްއުސްތާޛު) or its abbreviation Uz. is used by people who are licensed to practice law.

== Ustad as a title in Hindustani classical music ==
Ustad (abbreviated as Ust. or Ut. or Ud. and from Persian استاد) is an honorific title for an expert person in Indian classical singing and instrumental playing, used for a Muslim musician. It is used in Hindustani classical music to recognize master performers. It is used as a music title. An expert other than a Hindu musician is given the title of ustad. The title is awarded to musicians by their teachers, prominent individuals, or members of their gharana in recognition of their expertise. It is used in various languages including Hindi, Bengali, and Punjabi. A Muslim woman who is an expert in Indian classical music is given the title of begum; some examples include Begum Akhtar and Begum Parveen Sultana. Pandit is the equivalent title for a Hindu man, and Vidushi, Pandita, or Panditain for a Hindu woman.

=== Usage ===
The title of ustad (and pandit) is prepended informally to the names of classical singers and players by their admirers, individuals or institutions once they have reached eminence in their performing art, especially in public performances. As they are informal titles, mentioning the names of eminent singers without those appendages is acceptable, unlike prefixes like doctor awarded formally by educational institutions.

The title ustad referring to a classical musician and the title ustad which is given to a knowledgeable person are different.

There are many ustads in Hindustani classical music, for example:

- Ustad Ahmed Jan Thirakwa
- Ustad Alla Rakha
- Ustad Zakir Hussain
- Ustad Amjad Ali Khan
- Ustad Vilayat Khan
- Ustad Nishat Khan
- Ustad Shahid Parvez
- Ustad Rashid Khan
- Ustad Bismillah Khan
- Ostad Kamini Kumar Narzary
- Ustad-i-Badshahan, a title referring to Sher Shah Suri by the Mughal Empire
- Ustad Ahmad Lahori, architect of the Taj Mahal
