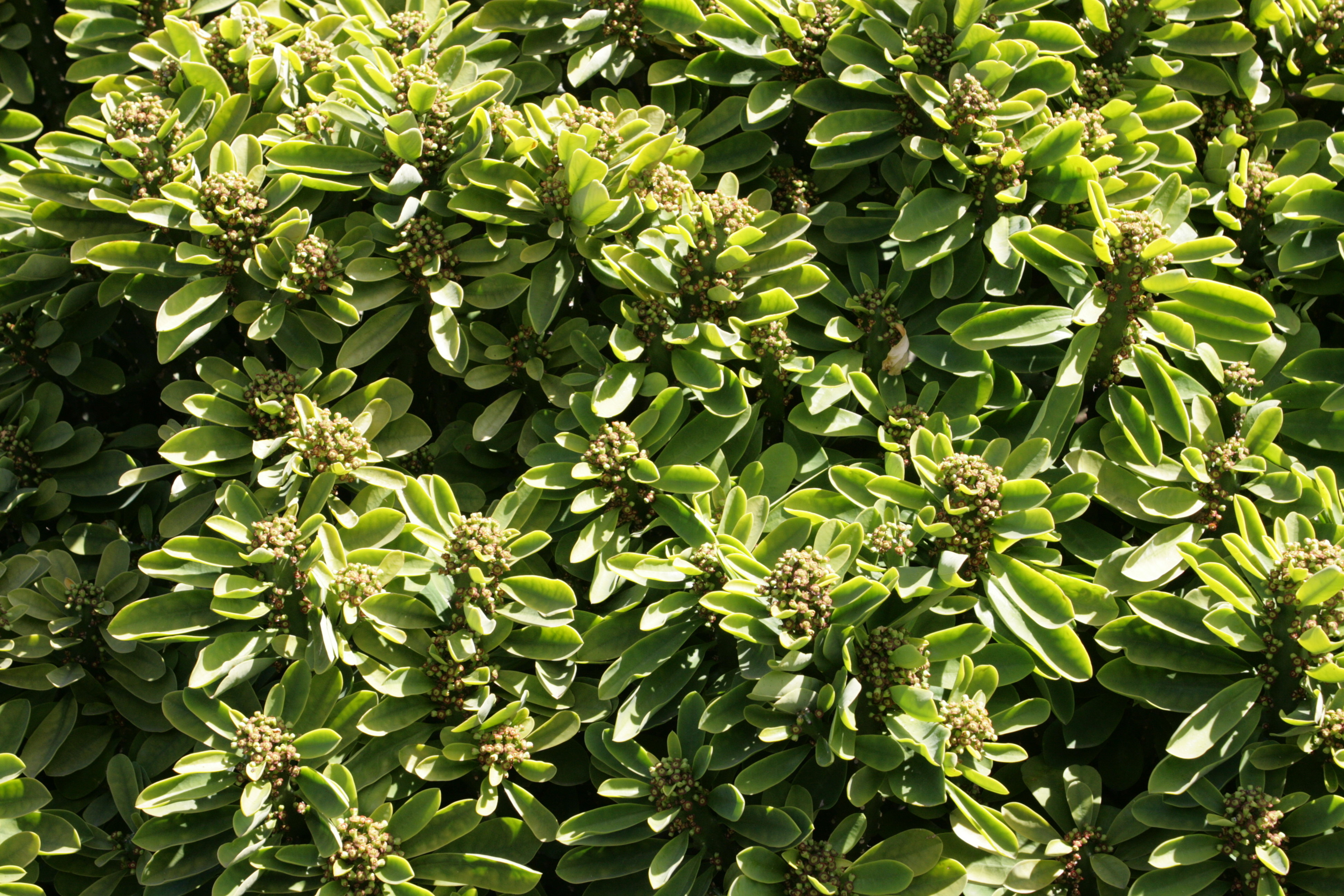
- CITES Appendix II

Scientific classification
- Kingdom: Plantae
- Clade: Embryophytes
- Clade: Tracheophytes
- Clade: Spermatophytes
- Clade: Angiosperms
- Clade: Eudicots
- Clade: Rosids
- Order: Malpighiales
- Family: Euphorbiaceae
- Genus: Euphorbia
- Species: E. neriifolia

Binomial name
- Euphorbia neriifolia L.

= Euphorbia neriifolia =

Species of flowering plant

Euphorbia neriifolia, also known as Indian spurge tree, hedge Euphorbia, Oleander spurge and fleshy spurge, is a species of spurge native to India, which was originally described by Carl Linnaeus in 1753. Leaves from the plant are used in traditional kajal making in West Bengal, India.

== Description ==
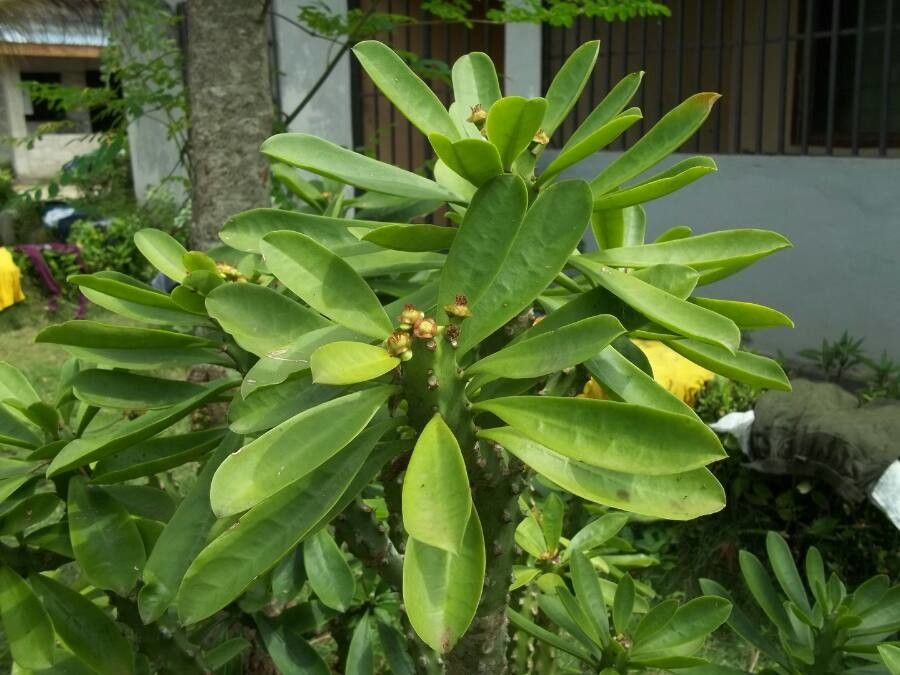
Leaves and flowers

It is a large, cactus-like, xerophytic, highly branched, succulent plant that grows as a tree with a loosely branched crown that reaches a height of 6.5 meters. The spread-out, upright branches are almost pentagonal, are about 3 centimeters thick and are divided into sections by constrictions. The main trunk and larger branches are rounded, younger branches are somewhat whorled, unjointed, whorled, grey or light green, glabrous, 8–30 mm thick, often leafless. The edges are covered with small, conical warts.

The obovate leaves are almost sessile and are 30 centimeters long. They remain longer on young shoots and grow towards the end of the branches, are thick, fleshy, alternate, oblong or spatulate in shape, 10-18 cm long by 3-7 cm, with an attenuate base, entire margins and a rounded apex. The leaves feature very short petioles 2-4 mm long. They are deciduous, persistent during the vegetation period, falling in late summer and early autumn. The thorn shields are triangular and thorns up to 12 millimeters long are formed.

=== Inflorescence ===
The inflorescence consists of simple cymes that are forked once to three times. The short and strong inflorescence stalk bears the reddish cyathia. The elongated nectar glands touch each other. The deeply lobed fruit is about 12 millimeters in size and is on a protruding and bent back stalk. The flowers are flattened-globose 1.5-2 mm x 4-5 mm, reddish, with a 6-7 mm peduncle. The corolla is absent but the involucre has two bright red bracts, almost round to ovate, 3-7 mm long.

== Distribution ==
It is native to central India, Odisha, and southern India in the Deccan, but is now naturalized in West Bengal, Sri Lanka, and throughout Southeast Asia in Burma, Thailand, Vietnam, Malaysia (except Borneo), the Philippines, and New Guinea. It is also cultivated as a hedge and ornamental plant in other tropical regions.

== Uses ==
The leaves can be eaten raw or cooked, when boiled with syrup. The leaves and slices of the branches can be turned into sweets similar to candied fruit. The plant is also grown as a living fence to delimit land or to contain livestock. The wood is aromatic, and is used for small objects such as knife handles. The latex is applied to cuts made by collectors in the bark of the Palmyra palm, to prevent attacks by the red weevil.

=== Culinary ===
In the Philippines, it is called karimbuaya in the northern regions of Ilocos and Cordillera, where the chopped leaves are a popular stuffing for lechon. It is called soro-soro in the Eastern Visayas, and is typically mixed into dinuguan and paklay.

=== Medicinal ===
The latex is slightly irritating on contact with the skin and toxic. Though it is a diuretic, purgative, rubefacient and vermifuge, and therefore has been used to treat constipation, asthma, sore throat and other conditions. Sushruta prescribed it mixed with water to treat various abdominal conditions such as jaundice and ascites, skin diseases, urinary disorders, even diabetes. It has also been used in the treatment of problems such as hemorrhoids.

The latex is used to remove warts and other skin eruptions by applying it directly to the lesion. The juice squeezed from heated leaves is a remedy for otalgia and otitis. The root and the pulp of the stem are considered antiseptic. The antibacterial activity had been harnessed by traditional practitioners as seen in its application for the treatment of ulcers, and the dressing of wounds. The root serves as an antispasmodic, and mixed with black pepper is applied to cure snake bites.

=== Pharmacological ===
Skin wounds treated with topical application of a sterile 0.5% and 1.0% aqueous solution of the aqueous extract of E. neriifolia latex have an improved healing process, as demonstrated by increased tensile strength, DNA content, epithelialization and angiogenesis. In a study conducted on the pharmacological activities of E. neriifolia leaf extract, researchers found that the leaf extracts have anti-anxiety, antipsychotic and anticonvulsant activities in mice.

The crude saponin from hydroacholic extract of the leaf contains euphol as the main sapogenin. The crude saponins showed good antioxidant as evidenced by the potent antioxidant activity in all parameters (hydrogen donating capacity, reducing power, anti-lipid peroxidation including scavenging activity against superoxide), except scavenging activity against hydroxyl radicals. The hydroalcoholic extract of dried leaves at 70% V/V demonstrated a greater anti-inflammatory and analgesic effect than standard doses of indomethacin and diclofenac sodium. The peripheral inhibitory activity as evidenced by the inhibition of carrageenan-induced paw inflammation is probably due to the presence of several flavonoids that possess anti-inflammatory and analgesic activities.

Ethyl acetate extract showed significant cytotoxicities against the following cell lines: Lewis lung carcinoma, B16F10 melanoma and SW480 human colon adenocarcinoma in a dose-dependent manner. Ethanol extract of leaves and petroleum ether extracts of its pods were tested for their antibacterial activities against Pseudomonas aeruginosa, Staphylococcus aureus, and Escherichia coli. The results showed that these extracts were more effective in inhibiting the growth of E. coli than the former two.

=== Religious significance ===
The sijou plant, Euphorbia neriifolia is considered the living embodiment of Bathoubwrai. Families that follow Bathouism plant a sijou shrub at the northeast corner of their courtyard, in an altar called sijousali. Bodo communities that follow Bathouism generally plant a sijou shrub at a community land, fenced with eighteen pairs of bamboo strips with five fastenings. Each pair symbolizes a pair of minor god-goddess. The five fastenings signify, from bottom: birth, pain, death, marriage and peace/pleasure. The bottom three fastenings, called bando, are those that one cannot escape in life; whereas the top two one could. In the past, thulsi and jathrasi plants were also commonly used in place of the sijou plant.

== Gallery ==
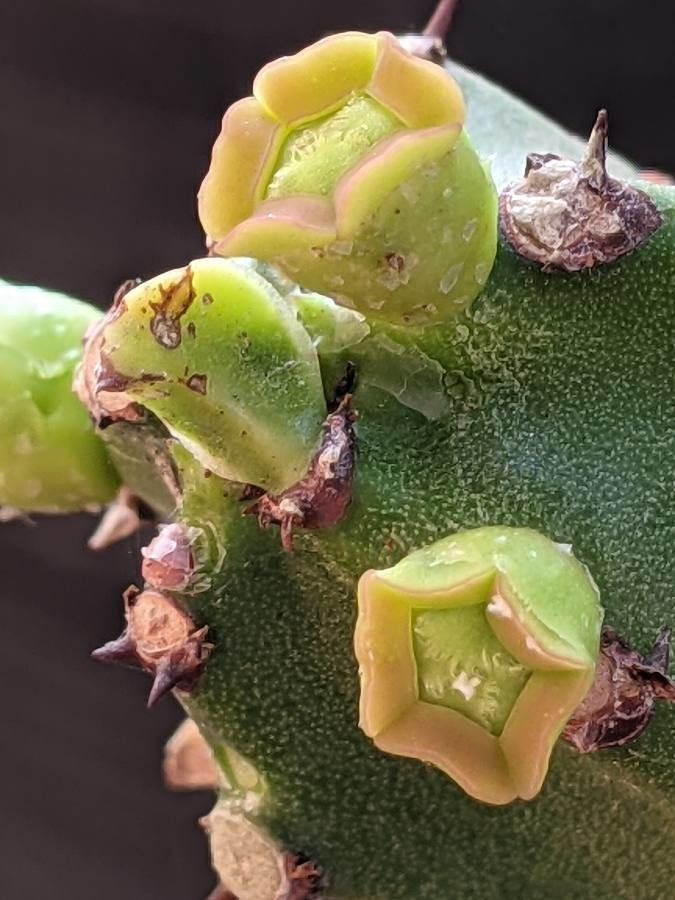
Flower

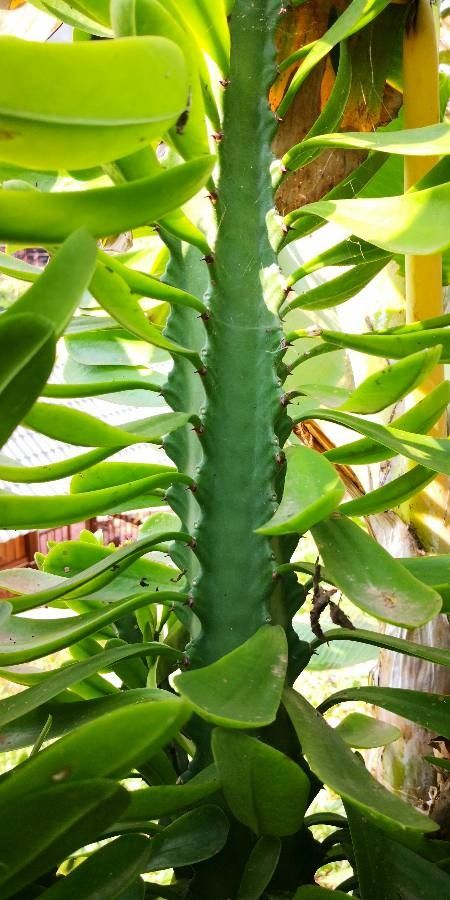
Leaves

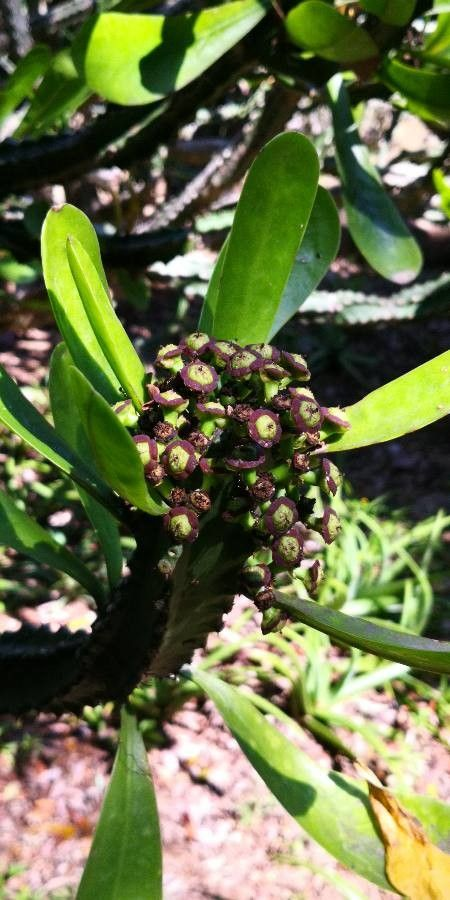
Fruit

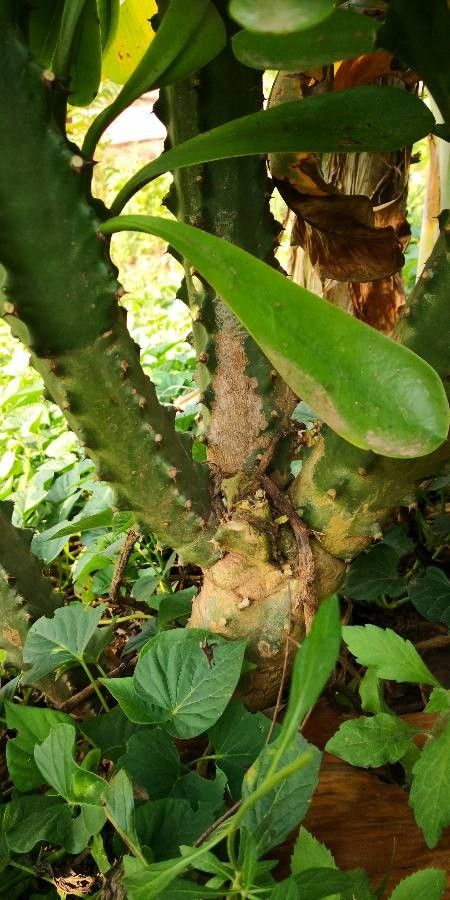
Bark

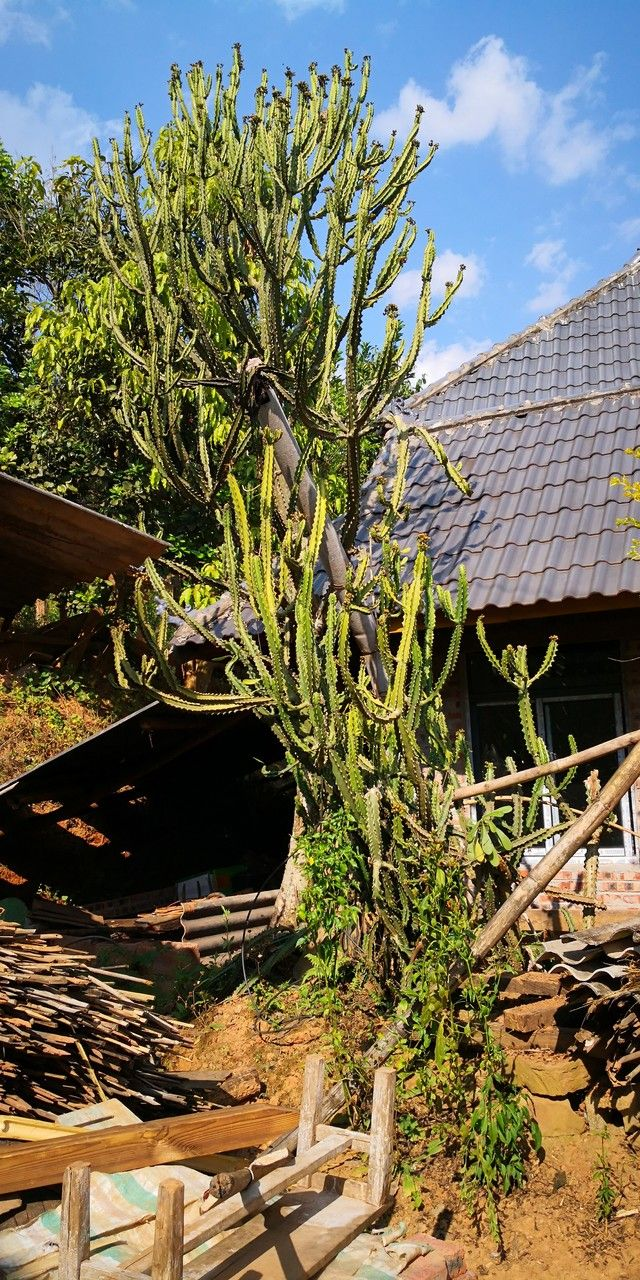
Habitus

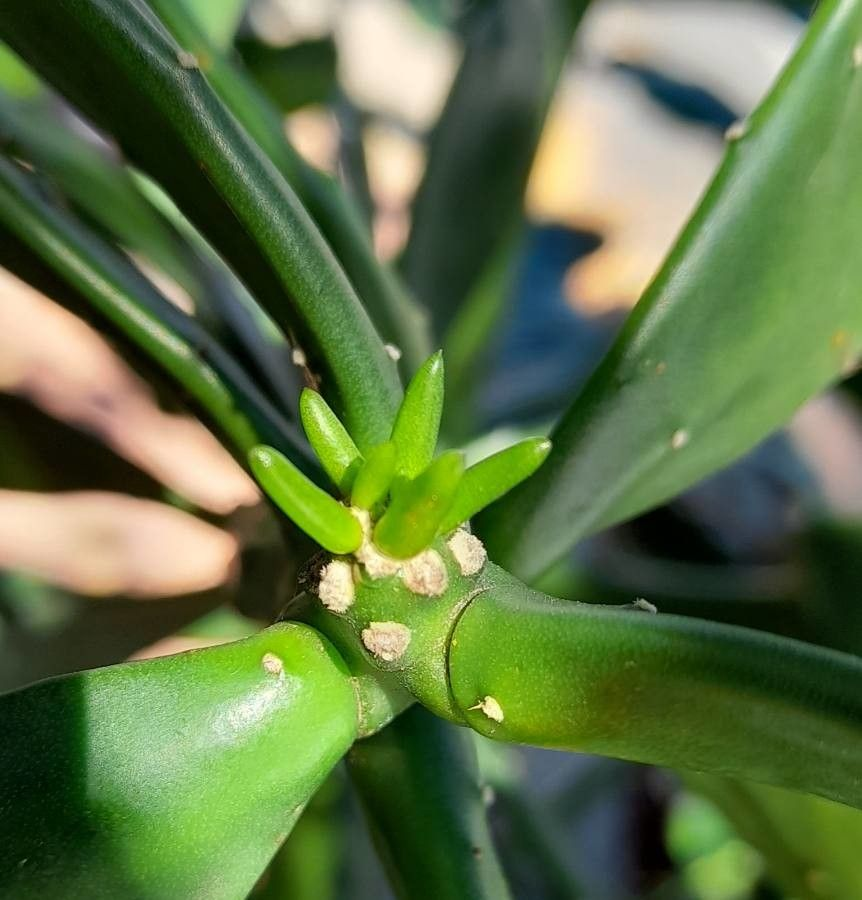
close up

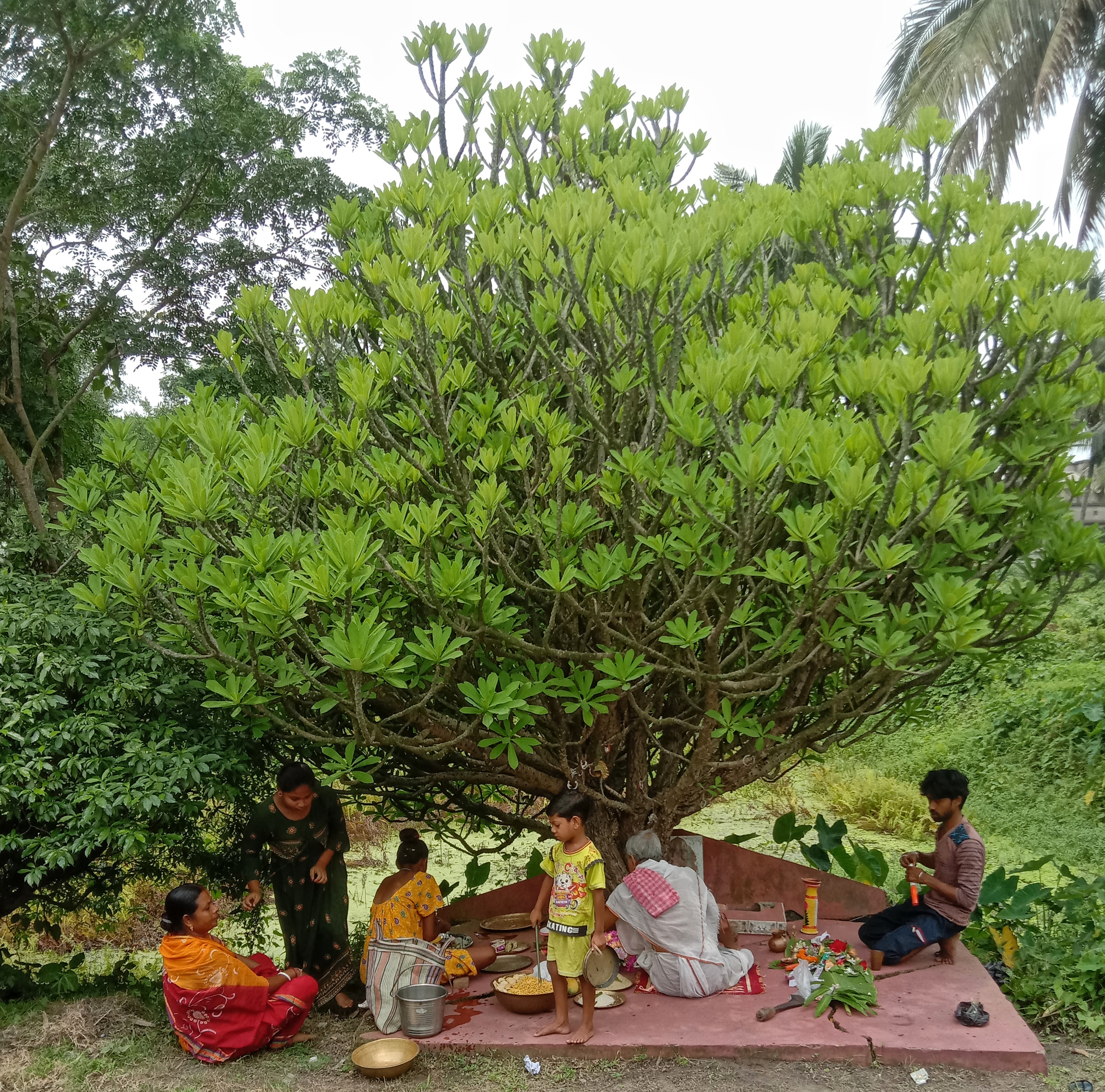
Manasa puja on the day of Dashahara in West Bengal, India.

== Sources ==
- Chinmayi Upadhyaya; Sathish S. (April–June 2017). "A Review on Euphorbia neriifolia Plant" (PDF). International Journal of Pharma And Chemical Research. 3 (2): 149–154. Archived from the original on 2018-04-21.
- Endle, Sidney (1911). The Kacharis. London: Macmillan.
- Narzary, Nareswar (2014). Bathou Religion and its Impact on Boro Society: a Folkloristic Study (PhD). Gauhati University. hdl:10603/114601.
