= Ker puja =

Public holiday and annual festival in Tripura, India

Ker puja is a festival held in Tripura, India. Performance of the puja, which is typically held in August, benefits the people and the state. The celebration occurs two weeks after the Kharchi Puja to honor Ker, the guardian deity of Vastu Devata. It includes offerings, sacrifices, and a prescribed boundary which both safeguards people from calamities and saves them from external aggression.

The puja was initiated by the Tripura rajas. Participation in the puja is required for the Halam tribe. For 2.5 days during the festival, entrances to the capital are closed, and participants, including the reigning sovereign, are not allowed to wear shoes, light a fire, dance, or sing.

Ker Puja fell on 15 July in 2017.
