= Kherai =

Religious festival of Boros

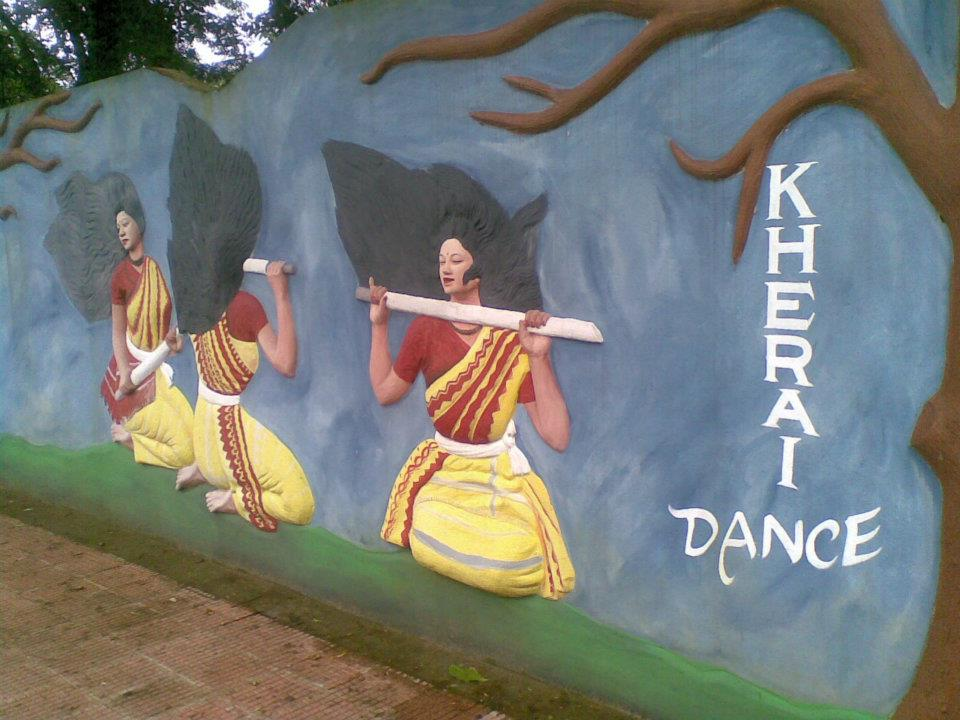
- Kherai of Boros
- Official name: Kherai
- Observed by: Boro people
- Date: In the months of Kartik, Ashar, Magh and whenever a family requires
- Duration: 3 days
- Related to: Ker puja of Tripuris

Kherai is the greatest religious festival of Boros. Boros are agriculturalists and their relation with agriculture resonates in their festivals. Kherai festival is performed for the welfare of public and private lives as well as for good harvest. It is intended to appease Bathou or Sibrai along with Mainao or Lakhsmi (The Goddess of Harvest) and host of other deities. It is of four kinds, namely Darshan kherai celebrated in first week of Kartik, Umrao kherai celebrated during Ashara at the end of "Amthisua", Phalo kherai celebrated at full moon day of Magh and Nowaoni Kherai celebrated whenever the family needs to. Darshan kherai is connected to Sali crops and it is meant for Mainao or Lakshmi. Umrao kherai is performed for the well-being of villagers as well as the Ashu crops. Nowaoni kherai is performed to get out of trouble by the family. There are similarities between Ker puja of Tripuris and Kherai puja of Boros.

== Rituals and Practices ==
Kherai dances form the main ritual of Kherai. For a period of three days and nights, Kherai dances are performed to revere the holy Bathou and other deities. Doudini or Deodhani (female exorcist) is the chief dancer and all rituals are performed by her and she is guided by the Douri, the Ojha and a Githal. Also two drum beaters, two flautists and two "Jotha" players are necessary to perform Kherai.

During Kherai, first, the Ojha enchants a spell on the Doudini and it is called "Alongikhangnai", second, she falls in trance, and in the third stage, she is believed to be converted into a spiritual being. Then she sings tales of gods and goddesses. Also, She dances which resemble the nature of gods and goddesses.

Dance forms of the Doudini are 1.Doudini Onsranai 2.Bathou Tharnai Eba Phwtharnai 3.Damju Phetharnai 4.Buhum Ha Swrjini 5.Dahal-Thungri Shibnai Mwsanai 6.Sa Gwlao Bonai Mwsanai 7.Khwijwma Fonai 8.Thungri Lanai 9.Gandwola Bwnnai 10.Khopri sibnai mwsanai 11.Khamao Barkhwnai mwsanai 12.Badali Birnai mwsanai 13.Mwicha Gelenai mwsanai 14.Bhathou Gidingnai 15.Nao bhasainai 16.Muphur Gelenai 17.Mainao Borainai 18.Mwcha Gelenai 19.Gorai Dabranai 20.Nao Jaoni 21.Dao Thwi Lwngnai Mwsanai 22.Zaraphagla Mwsanai 23.Thenthamali Mwsanai 24.Lantha Gurzi Mwsanai 25.Daowang Buthua Mwsanai 26.Saoria-Daoria Mwsanai 27.Maozi Mengbrang Gelenai 28.Neolai Gelenai Mwsanai 29.Mwchaglangnai mwsanai.

== Bibliography ==
- Brahma, Kameswar (1998). A Study in Cultural Heritage of the Boros. Tribal Research Institute of Assam.
- Bordoloi, B.N. (1987). Tribes if Assam Part I (PDF). Tribal Research Institute of Assam.
- Devi, Premalata (1994). Social and Religious institutions of Boros (PDF). Tribal Research Institute of Assam.
- Hajowary, Tapasi (2022-07-14). "The Dance forms of a Doudini in Kherai festival of the Bodos of Assam: An analytical study from religious perspective". ShodhKosh: Journal of Visual and Performing Arts. 3 (2): 22–30. doi:10.29121/shodhkosh.v3.i2.2022.148. ISSN 2582-7472.
