= Bathouism =

Boro folk religion

- बाथौ
- Bathou flag
- Type: Ethnic religion
- Classification: Animism
- Scripture: None
- Theology: Nature worship, Polytheism
- Supreme deity: Bathoubwrai
- Second major deity: Mainao
- Priests: Douri and Doudini
- Region: Assam, Northeast India, Bangladesh, Bhutan, Nepal
- Language: Boro language
- Liturgy: Bathou aroj
- Founder: unknown
- Other names: Bathou, Boro folk religion

Bathouism (also, Bathou) is the folk religion of the Boro people of Assam in Northeast India. The name Bathou (Ba, five; thou, deep) in Boro means five principles. The five principles are: bar (air), orr (fire), ha (earth), dwi (water) and okhrang (ether). The chief deity, called Bathoubwrai (bwarai: "the Elder")— omnipresent, omniscient and omnipotent— is said to have created the five principles. Though there are other minor gods and goddesses, Bathoubwrai is considered the Supreme God. Bathoubwrai is unseen. The second most important deity is Mainao, the daughter of Bathoubwrai, who is considered as the "protector of the rice fields".

== Evolution and Variations ==
Bathouism has evolved and adapted over time, shaped by various social, cultural, and historical factors. These influences have led to the emergence of different variants within Bathouism. While the core beliefs and principles remain largely the same, certain practices and rituals have undergone changes or have been interpreted differently among various branches. One significant factor influencing Bathouism has been its interaction with other religions and belief systems, such as Hinduism.

Currently, within Bathouism, there are various branches, including Bibar Bathou, Bwli Bathou, Aroj Bathou, Moni Bathou, Jangkhrao Bathou, and Sonathon Bathou, among others.

== Altars ==
The altars of Kamaika (Khamaikha), Mainaw and Bathou are situated in the easternmost part of the main house. Bathou is always worshiped in conjunction with the goddess Mainaw /Kamaika (Khamakha). when worshiping, Baraja remains on the right side of Bathou and Mainaw remains on the left side and the worshipers always face east. When you bow down to the lamp and incense sticks in the Bathou, you have to rotate it 5 times in the anti-clockwise direction While to the Mainaw one is to rotate it 7 times in the anti-clockwise direction.

== Sijou plant ==
The sijou plant, Euphorbia neriifolia is considered the living embodiment of Bathoubwrai. Families that follow Bathouism plant a sijou shrub at the northeast corner of their courtyard, in an altar called sijousali. Bodo communities that follow Bathouism generally plant a sijou shrub at a community land, fenced with eighteen pairs of bamboo strips with five fastenings. Each pair symbolizes a pair of minor god-goddess. The five fastenings signify, from bottom: birth, pain, death, marriage and peace/pleasure. The bottom three fastenings, called bando, are those that one cannot escape in life; whereas the top two one could. In the past, thulsi and jathrasi plants were also commonly used in place of the sijou plant.

== Gods, goddesses and gurus ==
Sidney Endle differentiates between household gods and community gods. Of the household gods Bathoubwrai, Mainao, Song Bwrai/Burai and Bura Bagh Raja are considered prominent. The practice of representing Bathoubwrai by the sijou tree was more common among Boros (or Mech) of Goalpara region, and less so in Darrang. Song Raja is usually represented inside the house in an altar called dham, a deity who obtains devotion from women, and receives offerings during women's menses; but these offerings are eventually brought out and laid at the sijou tree representing Bathou.

The eighteen pairs of gods-goddesses are:

1. Mwnsinsin bwrai-Mwnsinsin burwi
2. Si Bwrai-Si Burwi
3. Aham Bwrai-Aham Burwi
4. Khuria Bwrai-Khuria Burwi
5. Eheo Bwrai-Eheo Burwi
6. Mainao Bwrai-Mainao-Burwi
7. Bwlli Bwrai-Bwlli Burwi
8. Deva Bwrai-Devi Burwi
9. Gongar Bwrai-Gongar Burwi
10. Joumwn Bwrai-Joumwn Burwi
11. Song Raja-Song Rani
12. Hasung Bwrai-Hasung Burwi
13. Rajong Bwrai-Rajong burwi
14. Agrang Bwrai-Agrang Burwi
15. Hazw Bwrai-Hazw Burwi
16. Emao Bwrai-Emao Burwi
17. Mohela Bwrai-Mohela Burwi
18. Hafao Bwrai-Hafao Burwi

== Worship ==
=== Traditional ===
Traditional Bathouism did not have any written scriptures or religious books, nor temples. Worship is performed at the sijousali, and constitutes offering animals and fowls for sacrifice and rice beer. Notable religious festivals were Kherai, Garja and others. These ceremonies are performed by priests called Douri (male priest) and Doudini (female priest). This religion was not organized.

=== Revivalism/Reformation ===
All Bathou Religious Union, an organization, was constituted in 1992 and it has begun reviving and reforming the traditional religion. The traditional role of the Douri and Doudini are replaced by the Gwthari Asari appointed by the organization, and a band of singers who sing in a practice called bathou aroj. The construction of temples, resembling churches or mosques called thansali, have come into being. Bathou aroj is performed on Tuesdays in thansalis. Sacrifices of animals and fowls, and offering of rice beer as modes of worship has been replaced by offering of flowers, fruits and the burning of incense. The partaking of prasad has also become popular.

== See also ==
- Ahom religion
- Donyi Polo
- Sanamahism
