= Sifung =

Musical Instrument

- Classification: Indian Woodwind Instrument

Playing range
- India

Related instruments
- Bansuri

The sifung (or sufin) is a traditional musical instrument of the Bodo people of Assam. It is a kind of bamboo flute, but much longer than is common. Sifung has five holes in contrast to the north Indian bansuri which has six holes.
