= Swargiary =

Indian Boro language surname

Origin
- Languages: Sanskrit, Boro
- Meaning: Heaven-folk
- Region of origin: Assam, India

Other names
- Variant form: Swargiari

Swargiary is a surname found among the Boro people of north-eastern India.The Swargiary clan seems to have been derived from the word ‘swrgw’ means heaven. It is alike to the heavenly-folk. The people of this group were originally a priestly clan but not considered like that of Brahmins of Hindu religion as the latter consists of a caste occupying high position in the society. Earlier, they became either Douri (priest) or Oja (man oracle) for performing the religious rites and rituals in their society. But in course of time, they were completely merged with the mass of cultivators, and took up cultivation and other professions also. Swargiary comes from the word Swarg-ároi, meaning Heaven-folk. The members of the clan used to be highest of all.

== Analysing The Swargiary Clan Surnames ==
In case of surnames, the term ‘inherited’ is used to define the genealogy of clan groups extant among the community. Its tradition and linearity has to be examined based on myth and rituals. As extant in the folksociety, the myth recounts that once a boy named ‘Sikhrijwhwlao’ and a girl named ‘Sikhrisikhla’ mutually engaged in an incest relationship. This is guilty in the view of social taboo and customs. Therefore they have to purify with the performance of rituals. The supernatural human ‘Mwnsingsing’ has advised the person to organize a ritualistic purification. To perform the rituals people have been suggested and accordingly distributed their duties. Based on assigned duties they have been divided into twelve sub-groups. As mythical tale recounts the twelve (12) different types of surnames have originated from this ritualistic occurrence. Each of the surnames refers to the particular clan group. These are: Swargiari, Ramchiari, Basumatari, Daimari, Baglari, Mahilari, Goyari, Chainari, Khakhlari, Uari, Mochahari, Narzari.2 As suggested by the super human being “Mwnsingsing”, the assigned people of “Swargiari” group is honoured as man of knowledgeable person and has to take responsibility for judging guilty or misdeeds. The assigned person from “Ramchiari” sub-group will have to execute the suggestion given by the Swargiari.

== Notable people ==
People with this surname include:

- Proneeta Swargiary - Indian dancer
- Suren Swargiary - Indian politician.
- Katindra Swargiary - Write

== See also ==
- Bodo people
- Bodo Sahitya Sabha
- Bodo language
- Narzary
