= Daimary =

Indian Boro language surname

Origin
- Language: Boro
- Meaning: River-folk
- Region of origin: Assam, India

Other names
- Variant form: Dwimary

Daimary is a surname found among the Boro people of north-eastern India. Daimary comes from the word Daima-ároi, meaning River-folk

== Notable people ==
People with this surname include:

- Biswajit Daimary (born 1971), Indian politician.
- Jolen Daimary (fl. 2021–present), Indian politician.
- Mithinga Daimary (born 1967), Central Publicity Secretary of the banned outfit ULFA, Assamese poet.
- Ranjan Daimary, founder president of the armed separatist outfit National Democratic Front of Boroland.
- Rihon Daimary (born 1960), Indian politician.

== See also ==
- Bodo Sahitya Sabha
- Boro language
- Narzary
