= Satish =

Satish is a masculine Indian given name (or patronymic surname). Notable people with the name include:

- Satish K. Agnihotri (born 1956), Indian judge
- Satish Chandra (politician), Indian National Congress leader
- Satish Chandra (historian), Indian academic
- Satish Chandra Agarwal, Indian politician
- Satish Chandra Basumatary, Indian Bodo-language writer
- Satish Chandra Dubey, Indian politician
- Satish Chandra Kakati, Indian journalist
- Satish Chandra Maheshwari, Indian botanist
- Satish Chandra Mukherjee, Indian educationist
- Satish Chandra Roy, Bangladeshi politician
- Satish Chandra Samanta, Indian politician
- Satish Chandra Sharma, Indian judge
- Satish Jain, Indian academic
- Satish Dhawan, space scientist
- Satish Gujral, Indian painter, sculptor, muralist, graphic designer and architect.
- Satish Kasetty, Indian Telugu-film director
- Satish Kaul, actor in Hindi and Punjabi films
- Satish Kaushik, Indian actor in Hindi films
- Satish Kumar, Indian film director and actor Uttar Pradesh, India
- Satish Mishra, minister in Uttar Pradesh, India,
- Satish Shah (1951–2025), Hindi actor
- Satish Sharma (1947–2021), Indian politician
- Satish Shetty, social activist
- Satish (criminal), Indian serial killer
- Satish Jain, Indian film writer and director

== See also ==
- Sathish (disambiguation), includes people with the name Sathish
