= UAL =

UAL or ual may refer to:

== Education ==
- University of the Arts London, a public research university in London, UK
- Universidade Autónoma de Lisboa, a private university in Lisbon, Portugal
- University of Action Learning, a unaccredited online university based in Port Vila, Vanuatu
- Universidad de Almería, a public university in Almería, Spain

== Transportation ==
- United Airlines (ICAO airline designator), a US airline
- United Airlines Holdings, its parent company along with its NASDAQ stock ticker
- United American Lines, an American passenger steamship line (1920–1926)

== Other uses ==
- Ual (tool), a sand clock-shaped grinding tool used by the Bodo people
- Ultrasound-assisted liposuction, a surgical procedure
- Unified Assembly Language, an ARM architecture computer language
