= Basum =

Basum may be,

- Basum Lake or Pagsum Lake, Tibet
- Basum language, a Bodish (Sino-Tibetan) language of Tibet

== See also ==
- Basumatary, an Indian Boro language surname
