= Khardwi =

Khardwi is an alkaline liquid used in the cuisine of the Bodo people. It is produced as the filtrate of ash powder formed through burning dried banana stems, bamboo, coconut coirs or even potato plants. It tastes like strong soda and used in small quantities as an ingredient in gravy. Khardwi is a common favorite drink in Bodoland, Assam especially among the Bodos. Khardwi is one of the important part of the Bodo cuisines. It is use in making Bodo curries like lafa (local name for green vegetables) kharwi, mwitha bangal (local name for green leaf vegetables) kharwi, sojona bilai (local name for green leaf vegetables) kharwi and many other green leaf kharwi. It is also used to make some curry like onla, sobai kharwi, etc.
