= Mosahary =

Indian Boro language surname

Origin
- Languages: Boro, Sanskrit
- Meaning: Tiger-folk
- Region of origin: Assam, India

Other names
- Variant forms: Baghlary, Moosahary

Mosahary (also Baghlary) is a surname found among the Boro people of north-eastern India. Mosahary comes from the word Mosa-ároi, meaning Tiger-folk and Baghlary is Sanskrit term for Mosahary.

== Notable people ==
People with this surname include:

- Ranjit Shekhar Mooshahary - Former Director General of BSF, Former Governor of Meghalaya
- Emmanuel Mosahary - Former MLA (Tamulpur)

== See also ==
- Boro people
- Bodo Sahitya Sabha
- Boro language
