= Sathish (disambiguation) =

Sathish (born 1987) is an Indian actor and comedian.

Sathish may also refer to:

== People with given name Sathish ==
- P. D. Sathish Chandra, Indian actor
- Sathish Kalathil (born 1971), Indian film and documentary director and producer
- Sathish Kumar Karunakaran (born 2001), Indian badminton player
- Sathish Krishnan (born 1985), Indian actor, dancer and choreographer
- S. R. Sathish Kumar, Indian cinematographer
- Sathish Ninan (born 1969), Indian judge
- Sathish Ninasam, Indian actor
- Sathish Perera (1969–2012), Sri Lankan singer, composer and songwriter
- Sathish Sivalingam (born 1992), Indian weightlifter
- Sathish Suriya (born 1976), Indian film editor

== People with surname Sathish ==
- I. B. Sathish, Indian politician
- Nivedhithaa Sathish (born 1998), Indian actress
- Rajagopal Sathish (born 1981), Indian cricketer

== See also ==
- Satish, an Indian male given name
- Satish (criminal), Indian serial killer
- Satish (song), a 2019 single by Tee Grizzley
