= Palash Kandy =

Village in Sherpur District, Bangladesh

Coordinates: 24.940605°N 90.180210°E

Palash Kandi is a village in Pathakata Union of Nakla Upazila, Sherpur District, Bangladesh.

== See also ==
- List of villages in Bangladesh
