= Joy Bhadra Hagjer =

Indian politician

Personal details
- Born: 2 April 1914 Nanadisa near Haflong
- Died: 16 July 1973 (aged 59) Shillong, Shillong
- Spouse: Nirupama Hagjer
- Occupation: Politician, Writer, MP, MLA, Cabinet Minister for Tribal Areas and Development, Minorities and Culture, Govt. of Assam

Joy Bhadra Hagjer (1914–1973) was an Indian politician. He held many portfolios in the Assam Legislative Assembly. At the time of his demise, he was undivided Assam's Minister of Veterinary, Jails and Minority Affairs as on 18 July 1973. He belonged to the indigenous Dimasa community. He was honoured being founder president of Bodo Sahitya Sabha as its President, and there are also some colleges in the state named after him.

== Early life and education ==
Joy Bhadra Hagjer was born in the tiny village named Nanadisa located near Haflong. He earned his Bachelor of Arts from Murari Chand College, Sylhet.
