= Boro culture =

Culture in Assam, India

Boro culture is the culture of the Boro people in Assam. For long, the Boros have been farmers living in an Agrarian society with a strong tradition of fishery, poultry, piggery, with rice and jute cultivation, and betel nut plantation. They make their own clothing from scratch, such as traditional attires. In recent decades, the Boros are influenced by recent social reforms under Boro Brahma Dharma and the spread of Christianity.

== Religion ==
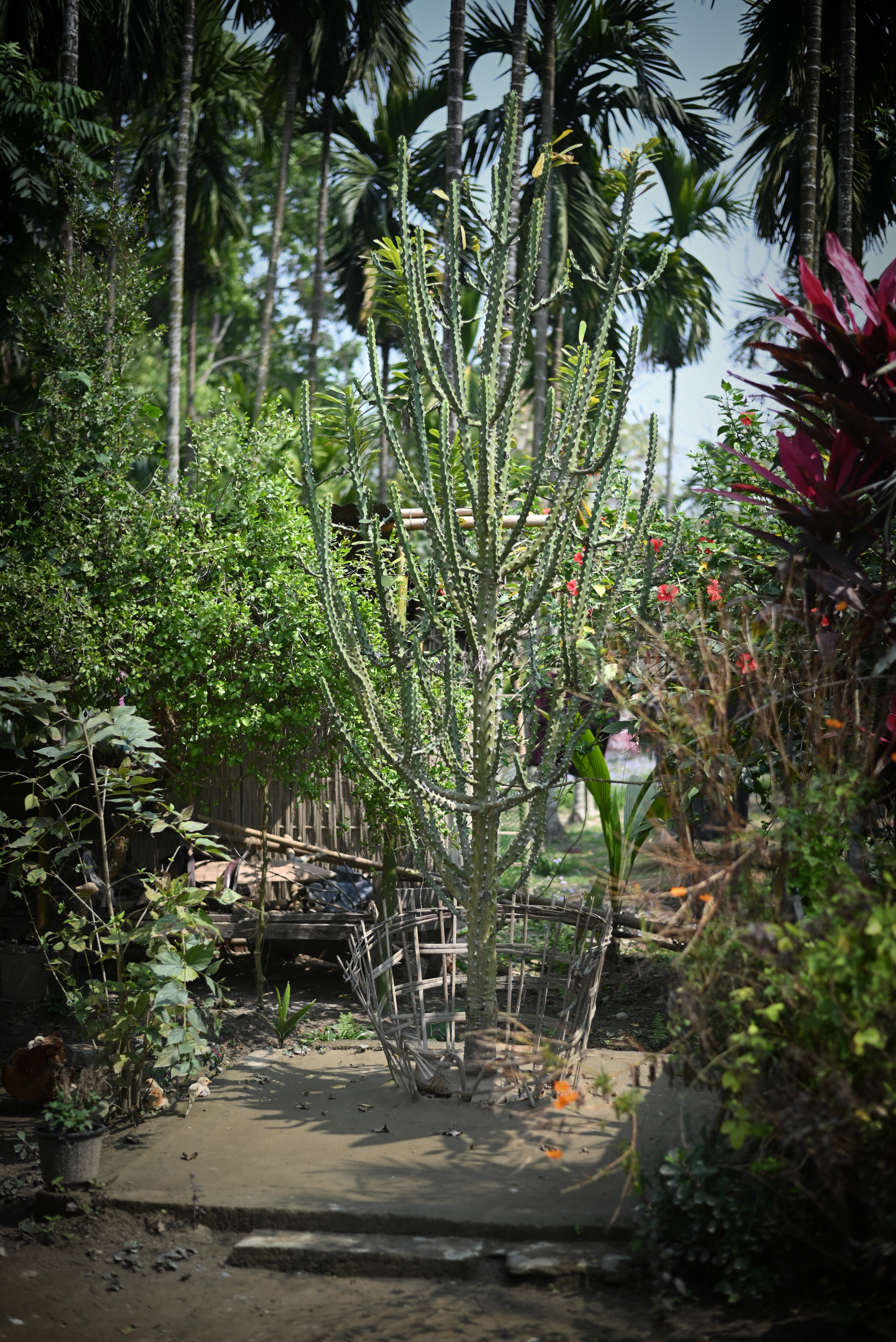
The siju tree (Alluaudia procera or Madagascar Ocotillo) is believed to be the God (বাথৌ, bathou) of the Bodos.

Boros follow Bathouism, Boro Brahma Dharma and Shaivism, Christianity, predominantly Baptists.

== Music and dance ==
=== Bagurumba ===
The Boros traditionally dance Bagurumba. This dance is accompanied by the Bagurumba song.

Moreover, there are about 15/18 kinds of Kherai Dance like Ranachandi, Gorai Dabrainai, Dao Thwi Lwngnai, Khwijema hannai, Mwsaglangnai.

=== Musical instruments ===
Among the many different musical instruments, the Boros use: Kham, Siphung, Serja, Jotha, Jabsring, Khawang, Bingi, Rege.

- Siphung: This is a long bamboo flute with only five holes rather than six as the north Indian Bansuri would have and is also much longer than it, producing a much lower tone.
- Serja: This is a violin-like instrument. It has a round body and the scroll is bent forward.
- Khawang: It is a block of bamboo split into two halves for clapping.
- Kham: It is a long drum made of wood and skin of goat.
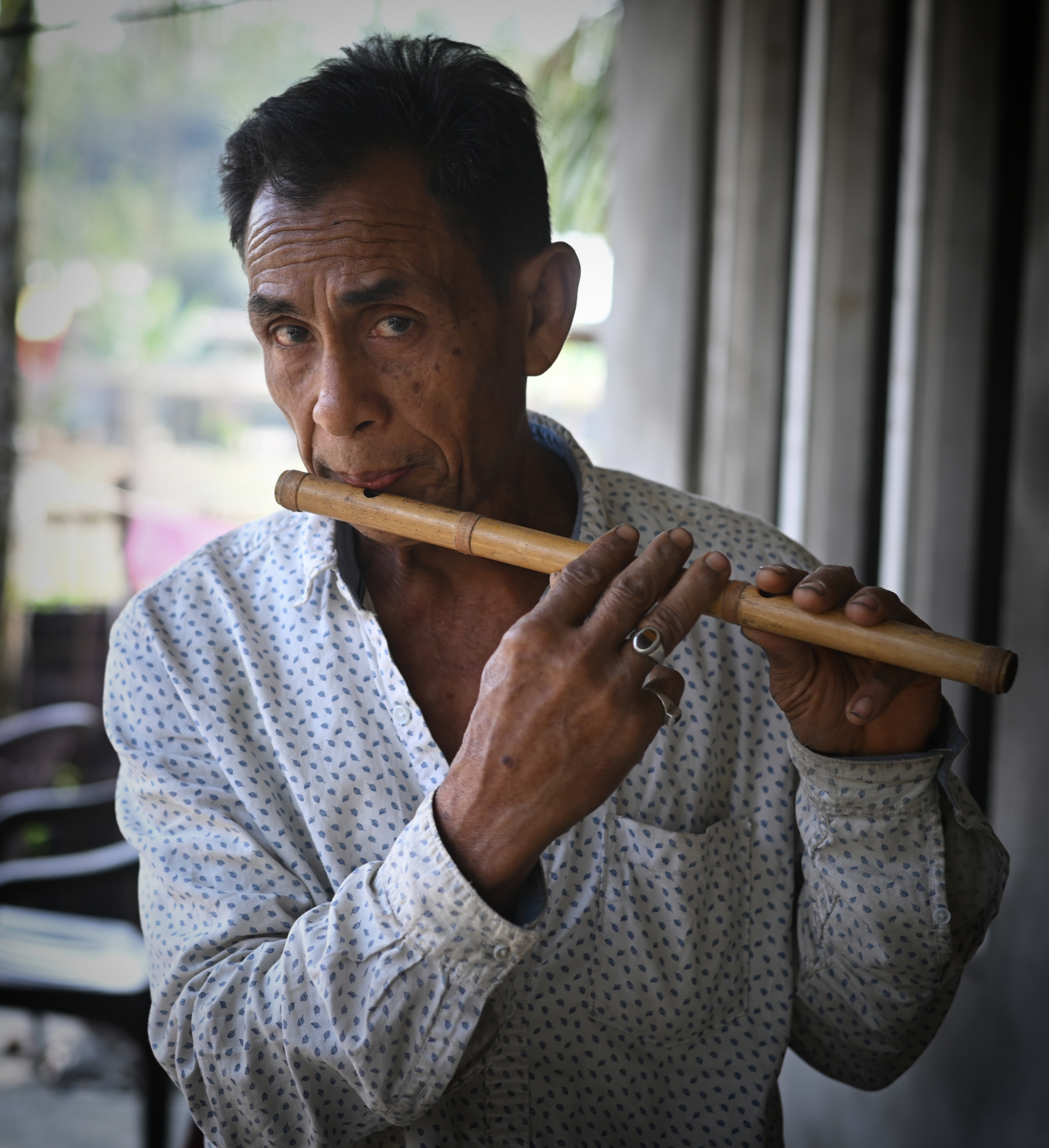
Chifung (flute) is an instrument of Boro community

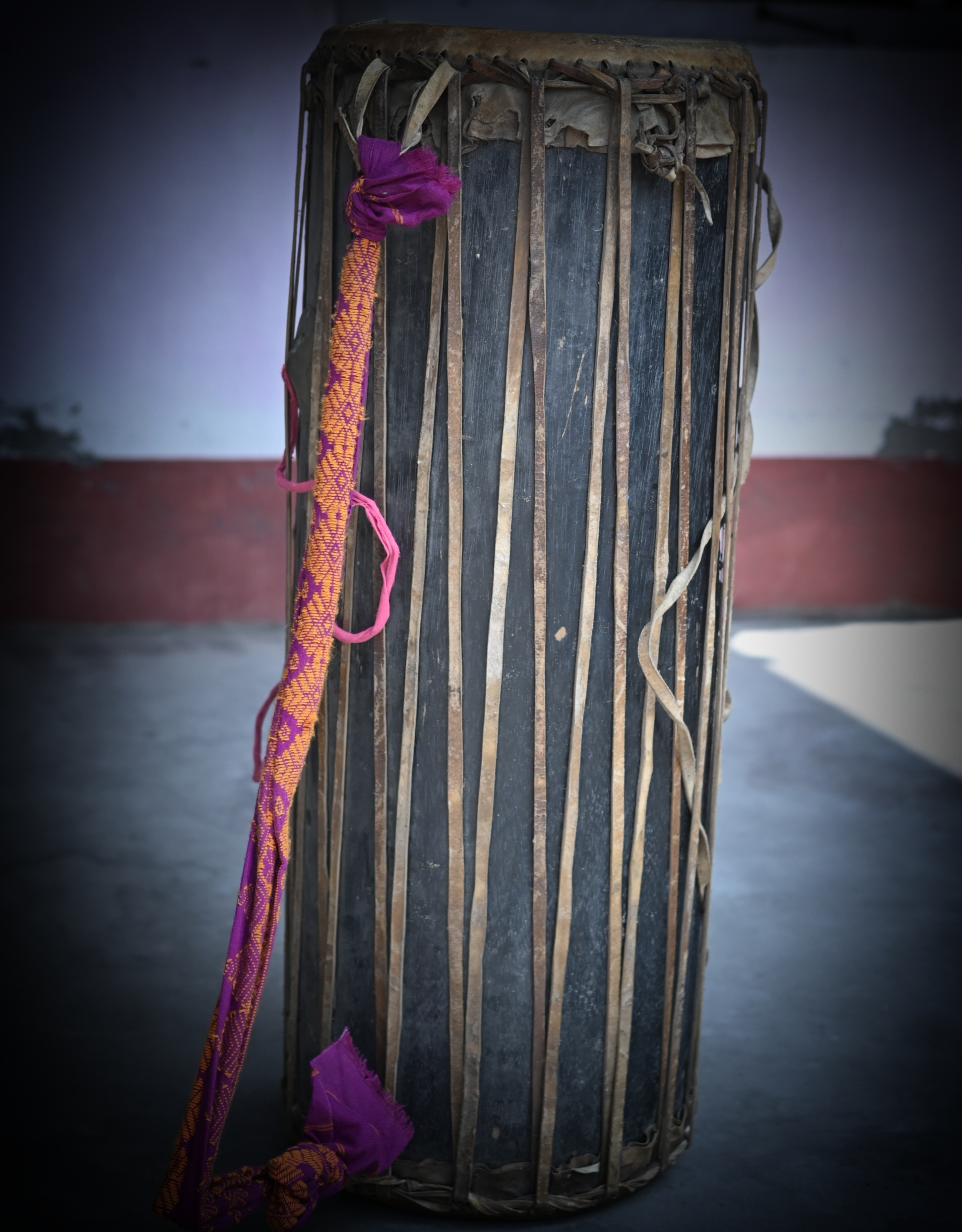
Kham, a musical instrument of Bodo community.

== Cuisine ==
=== Food ===
Rice is the main staple food but eaten with non-vegetarian dishes like fish or pork.

=== Traditional dishes ===
- Oma Bedor: Most of the Boro people like Oma (Pork) Bedor (meat). They prepare it with different flavors and styles. It could be fried, roasted, or stewed. The first type is pan-fried. The second type is made by roasting (or smoking) the meat in the sun for several days. The third one is called "Oma Khaji." They cook it by mixing blood and meat. Fat makes it taste more rich and delicious.
- Ondla: Ondla is a gravy made from rice powder and slices of bamboo shoots. It is cooked lightly with oil and spices. Also, they add chicken or pork to ondla.
- Narzi: It is a bitter gravy made from dried jute leaves. Pork or freshwater fish can be cooked together with Narzi to generate a distinct taste. The Boros also like to have Dau Bedor, Jinai, and Samo.

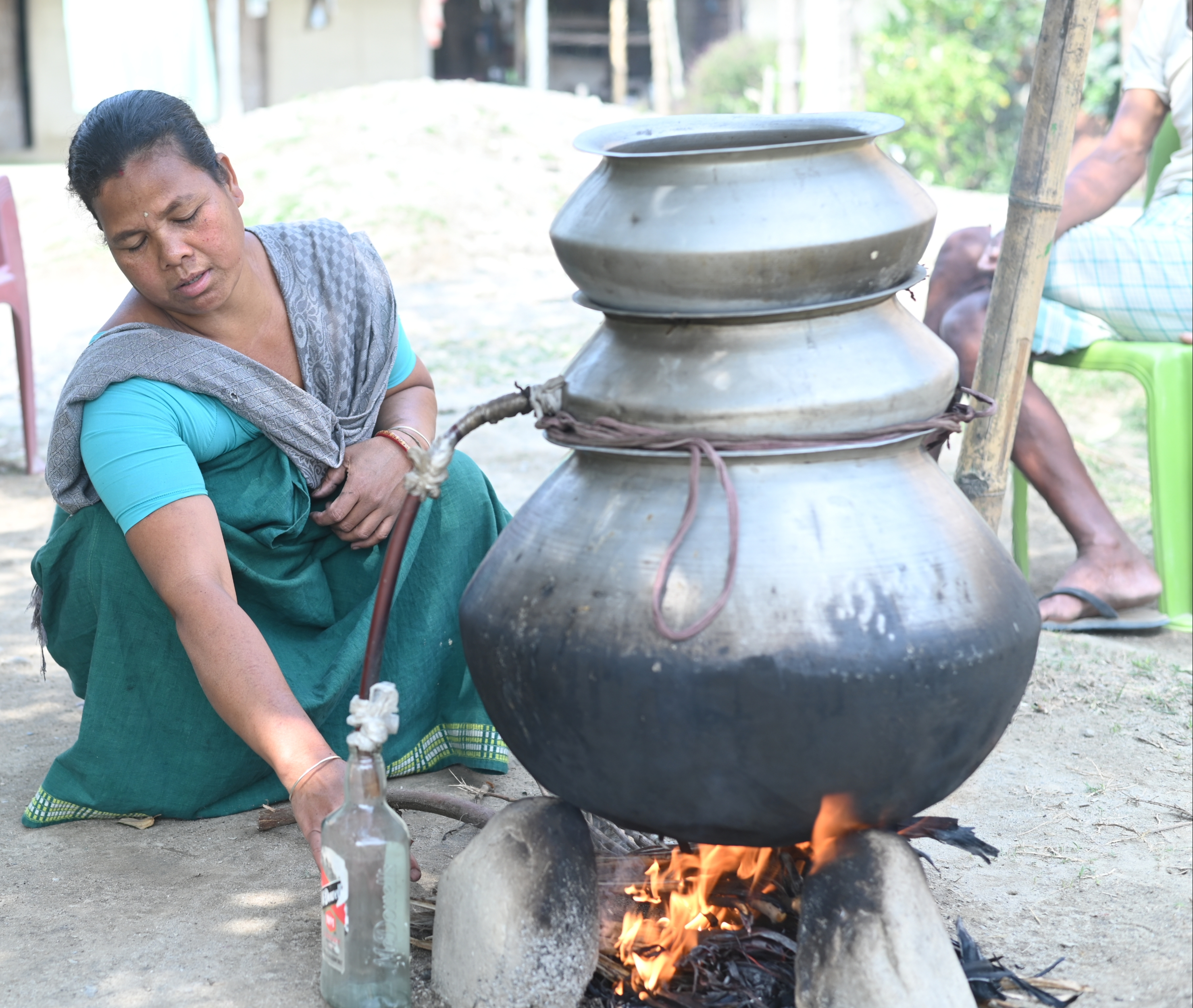
Making liquor in the traditional way.

=== Alcoholic beverage ===
Jou Gishi: Rice beer is produced by the Boros from different kinds of rice varieties using traditionally created starter cakes called angkur. The angkur contains a traditional recipe of herbs (dhapat tita, dhan, senikuthi, agara) that provide Jou gishi with its distinctive flavour, colour, and ethno-medicinal properties and the consumption of Jou gishi is sometimes ritualistic on the occasions of festivals, marriages and communal gatherings.

== Festivals ==
=== Bwisagu ===
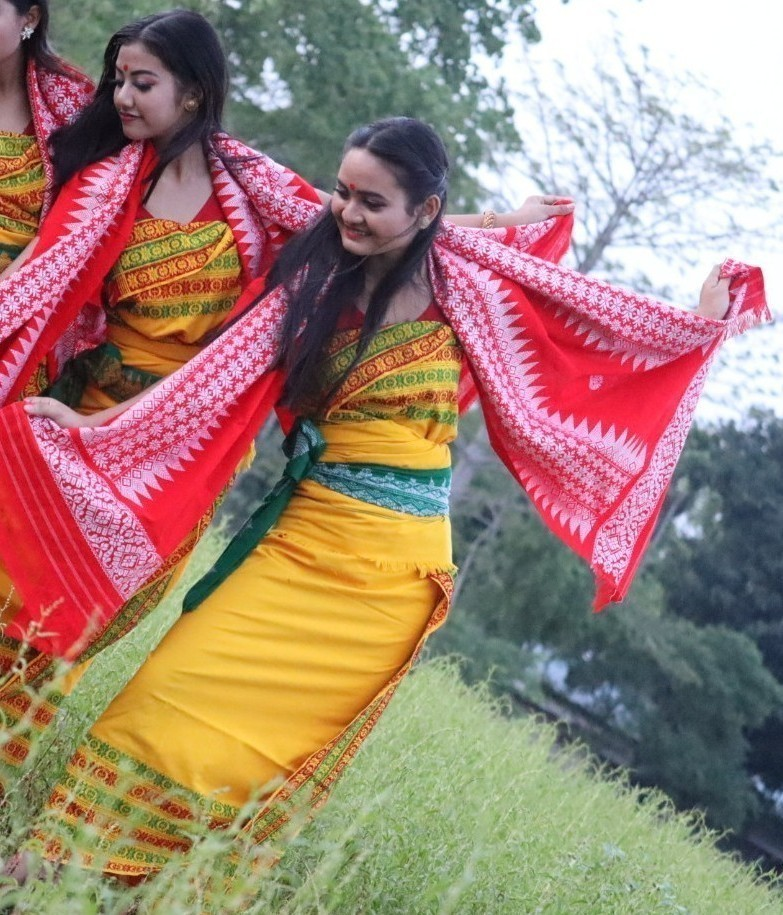
Bwisagu in traditional attire.

Bwisagu is the most cherished springtime festival celebrated by the Boro people at the advent of the new year. Famous for its myriad colours and merriment, it is celebrated during mid April.

The other festivals celebrated by the people are Hapsa Hatarnai, Wngkham Gwrlwi Janai, Domashi. Among all, the Kherai festival includes singing, dancing and drumming celebrated with much rejoice.

== Boro Attires ==
=== Aronai ===
Aronai is a small scarf, used both by men and women. Aronai is the sign of the Boro tradition and is used to felicitate guests with honour, as a gift. In winter, it is wrapped around the neck to warm up the body and generally used in the performance of the Boro dance. In ancient period, the Boro warriors used Aronai as belt in battlefield. At the time of the war, the Boro women would weave Aronai within a single night and present it to the warriors as they set out for the battlefield.

=== Dokhona ===
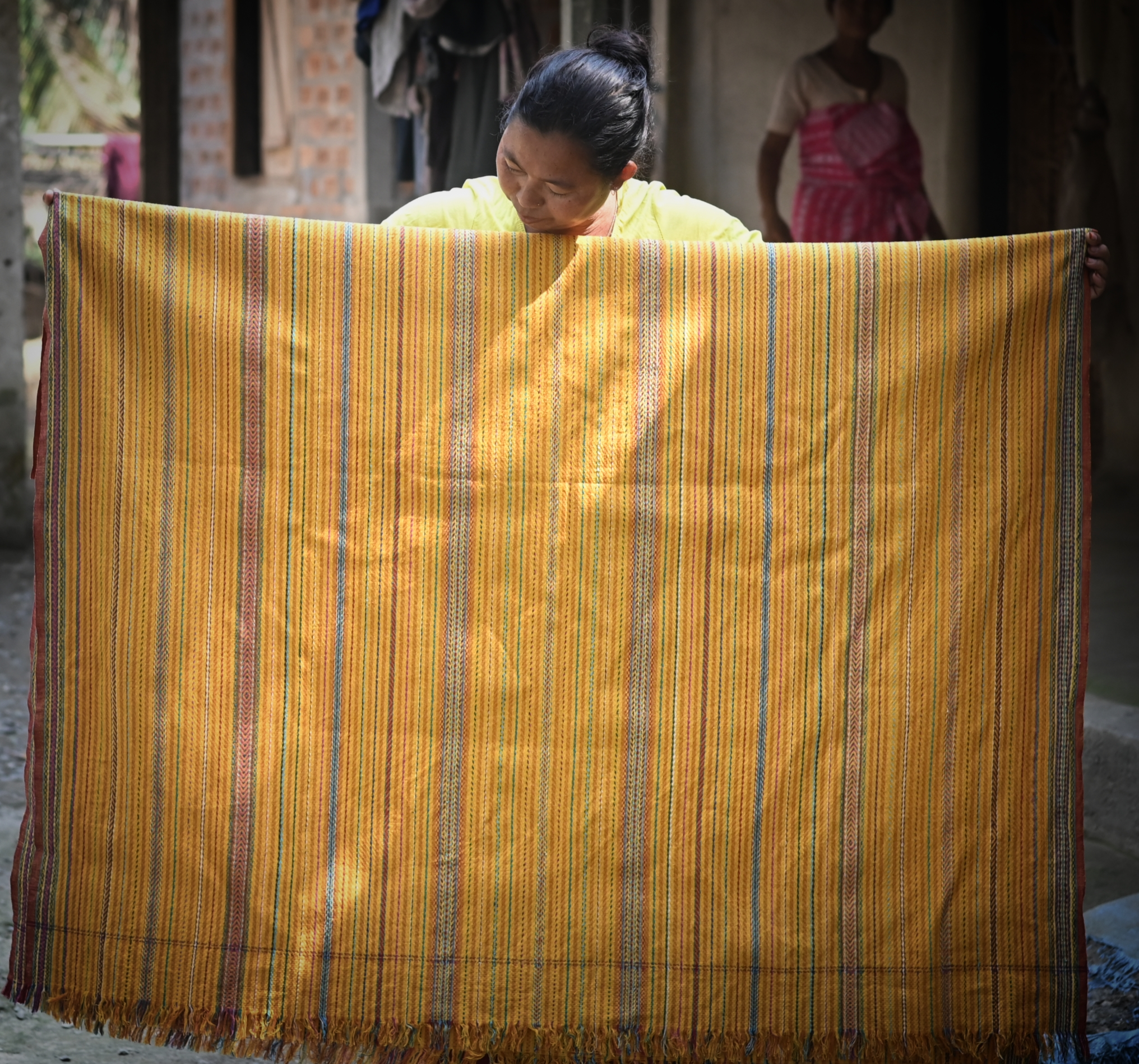
Agurguwai (dokhona) is a traditional Bodo dress.

Dokhona is the traditional dress of the Boro women. In general, the length and width of the Dokhona is 3 metres (m) and 1.5 metre (m) respectively, sometimes it depends on the figure of the body. It is worn to cover the whole body from the chest region to the legs by wrapping one round at a time over the waist. Varieties of Agor (design) and different types of colours are weaved for Dokhona. There are mainly two types of Dokhona- Plain Dokhona & Designed Dokhona. It can be sub-divided into types (according to design), depending on the designers. They are -

==== Without design (Matha Dokhona or bidon) ====
- Plain (only line without design)
- Design with plain border line (pari lanai)

==== Designed (Agor gwnang) ====
- Whole body designed (mwdwm gongse agor)
- Designed in border only (jing jing aaolo agor lanai)
- Slightly designed in body as well as border (gejwraobw ese agor erdernai)

Matha Dokhona (bidon) is actually plain, without any Agor (design); worn while worshipping God. It is available with different colours but Matha Dokhona with red or yellow colour is used as a traditional bridal attire, which is known as Dokhona Thaosi (pure Dokhona). Along with Hinjao Gwdan (bride), Bwirathi (Women receptionist of bride and bridegroom in Boro marriages) wear Matha Dokhona. The favourite colours are generally Gwmw (Yellow), Gwthang (Green), and Bathogang (Colour of parrot's feathers). Nowadays, the Boro women wear different colours of blouse with Dokhona to cover their upper bosom.

=== Jwmgra ===
The Boro women use Jwmgra (Scarf) to cover the upper portion of their body (Length-around 2.5 metres, width-around 1 metre). They wear various colours of Jwmgra with varieties of Agor (design) to beautify themselves. The Hajw Agor (mountain design) is one of the most popular design among different designs.

=== Gamsha ===
The Gamsha is the Boro male traditional attire. Generally, it is 2 metres (m) in length & 1.2 metre (m) in width. The Boro men used it to cover the portion from the waist to the knee by tying it around their waist. Gamsha can be different colours but Green with white (in border) is the most common colour in Boro Gamsha. Gamsha is compulsory to wear while worshipping God and for the Boro bridegroom.

Apart from the above-mentioned attires, the Boro women weave many types of traditional cloths such as Sima (like a bed cover), Wool (big wool scarf), Jwmgra gidwr (big scarf) and Phali (Handkerchief) etc.

== Handmade designs of the Boros ==
Hundreds of the Boro handmade designs are there, which always bloom on the Boro traditional attires. Most of the Boro weavers says that, the Hajw agor and Parwo megon is the most common and important design in the Boro traditional attires. Among the popular handmade designs, the following are mostly used Agor (design) used by the Boro women to decorate their attire:

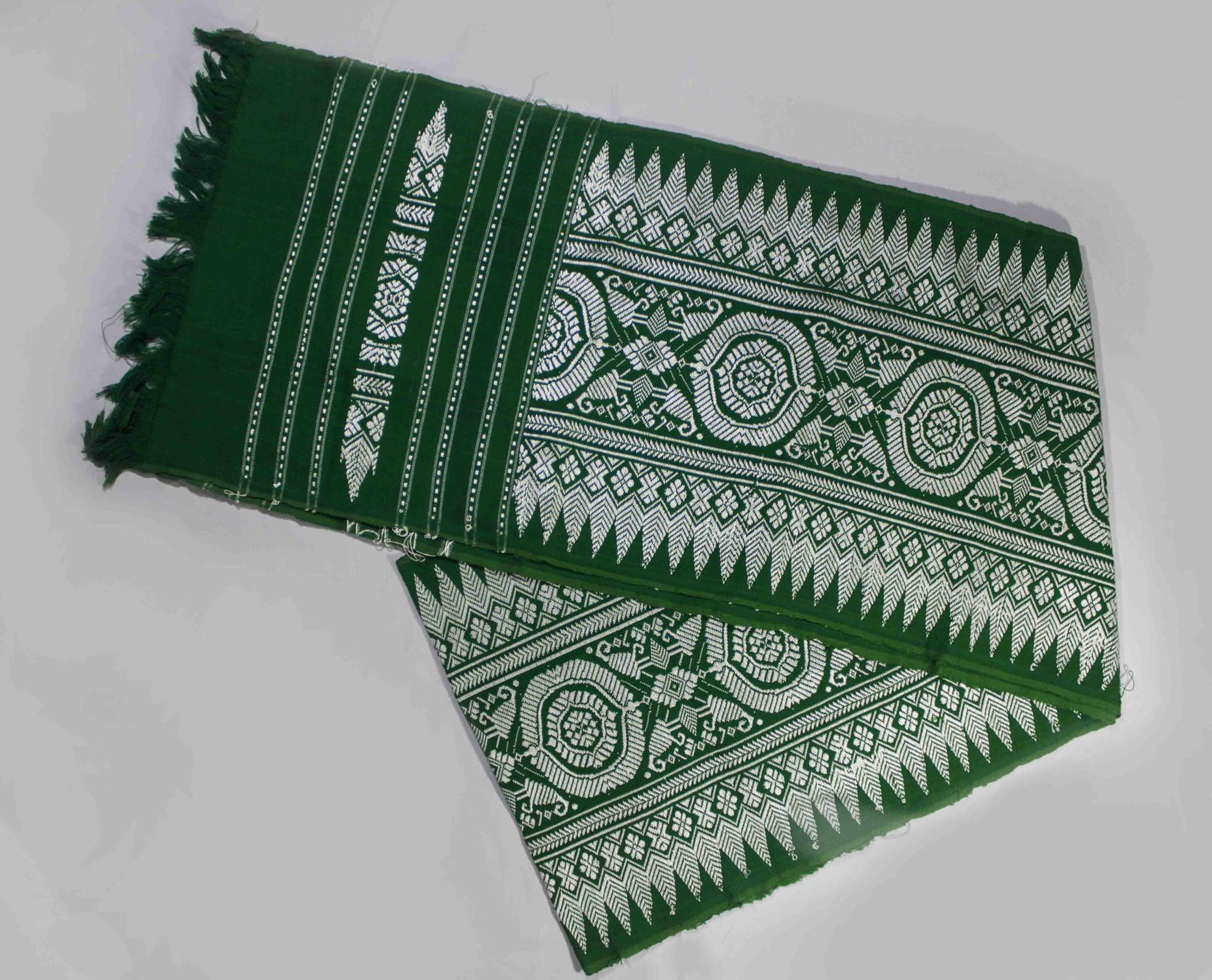
A green coloured Aronai with Hajo ('hill') Agor ('design').

- Hajw Agor (design of hills)
- Bandhuram Agor (design first crafted by Bandhuram kachari)
- Phareo Megon (design like pigeon eye)
- Daorai Mwkhreb (winkle of peacock)
- Phul Mwbla (varieties of bloomed flowers)
- Dingkhia Mohor (design representing fern leaf)
- Bwigri Bibar (design representing the flowers of plum)
- Muphur Apha (design representing the footprint of bear)
- Agor Gidir (design like a diamond shape)
- Gorkha Gongbrwi Agor (design representing twill)

== Tools ==
Khofri headgear is worn by the Boro farmers for protection from the sun and the rain.

== Gallery ==
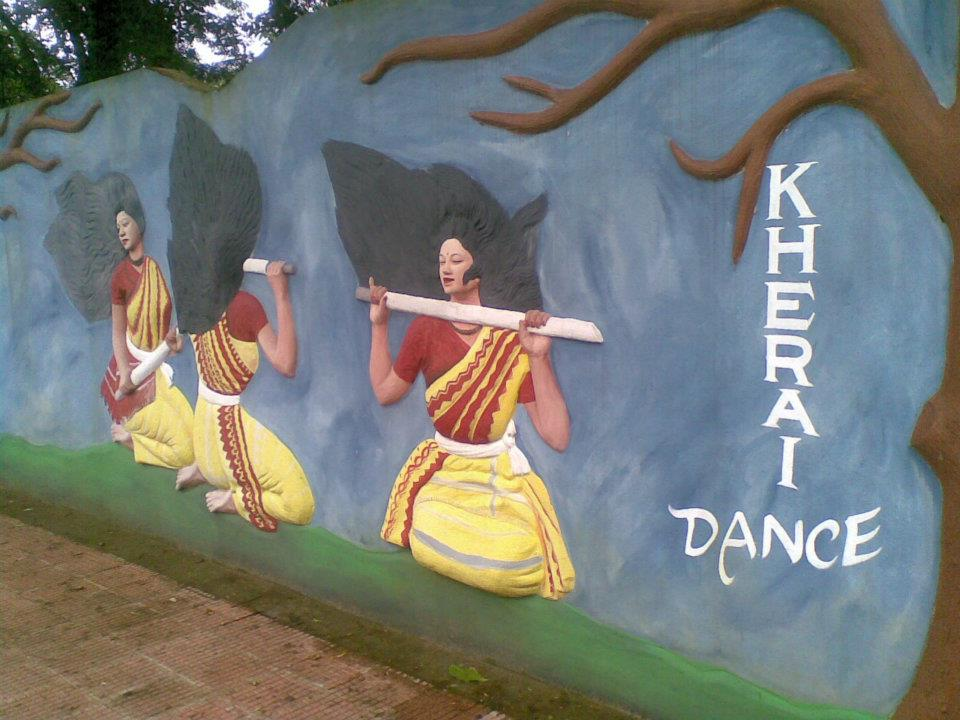
Kherai Group Dance

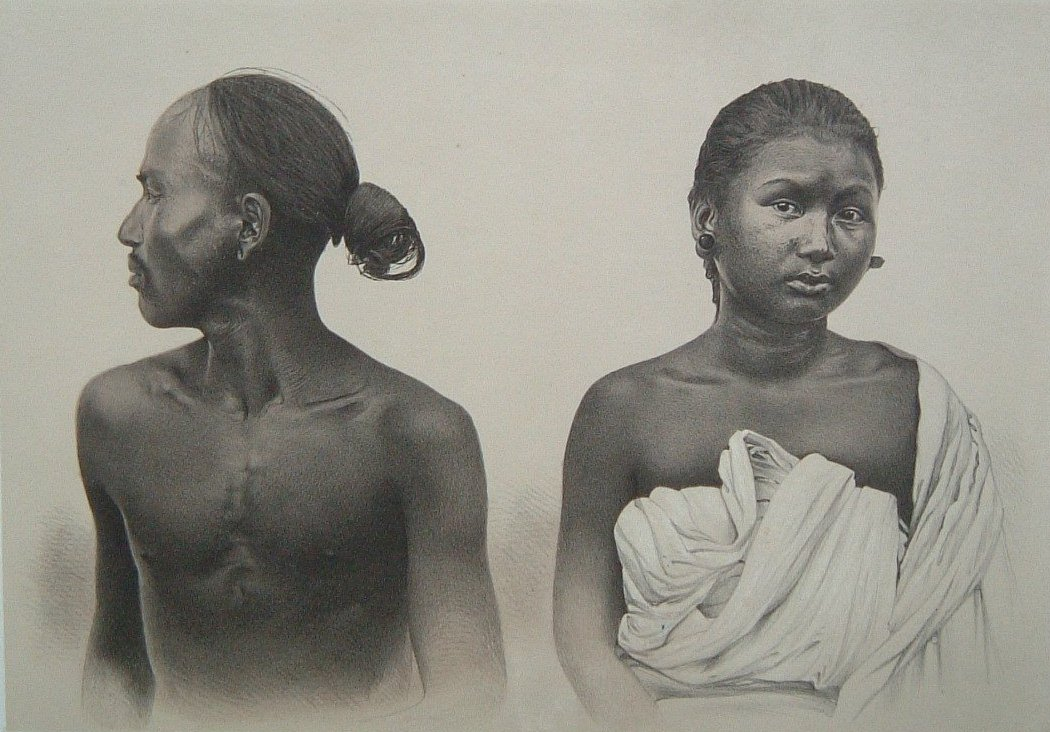
Boro man and woman

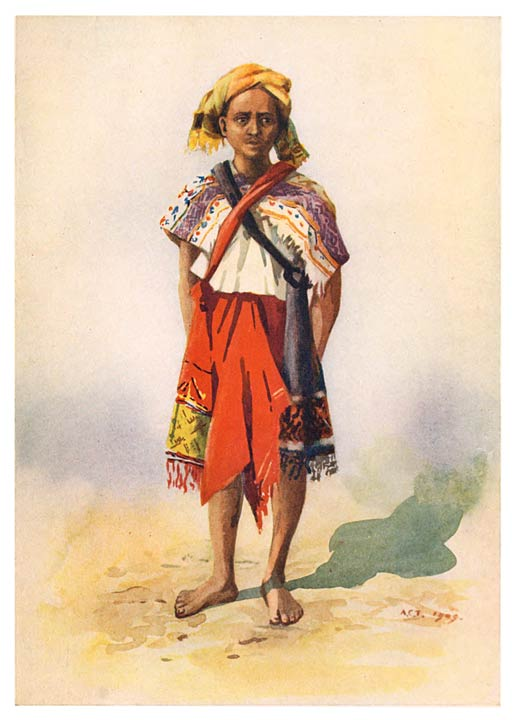
Boro man

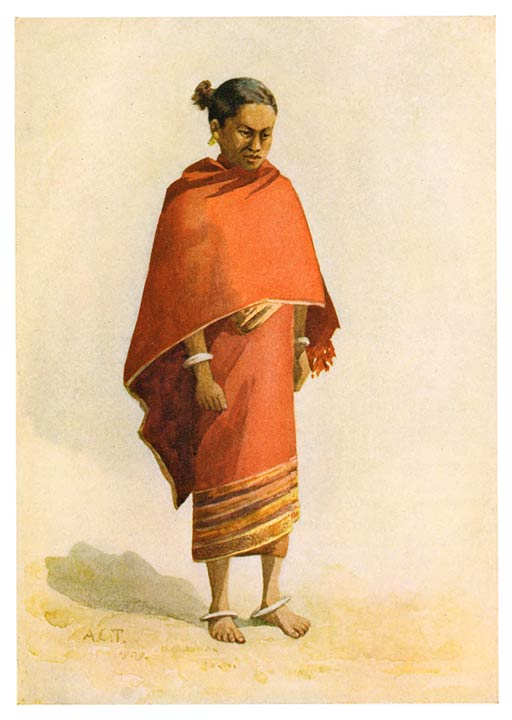
Boro woman

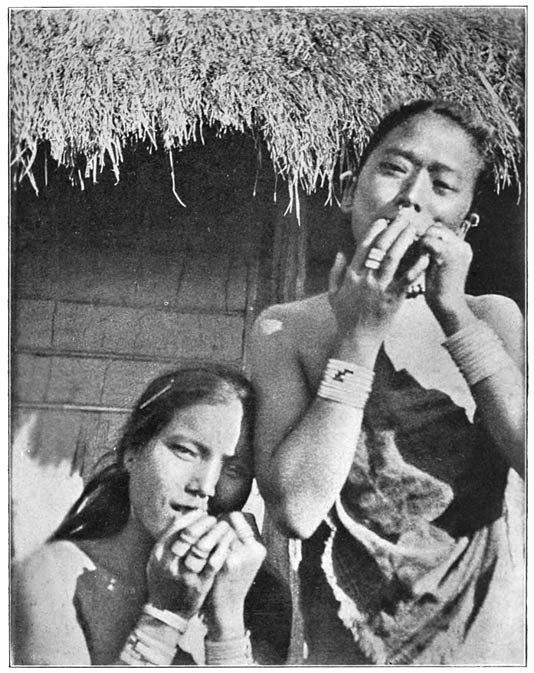
Boro woman playing jews harp

== See also ==
- Bodo Sahitya Sabha
