= Ual (tool) =

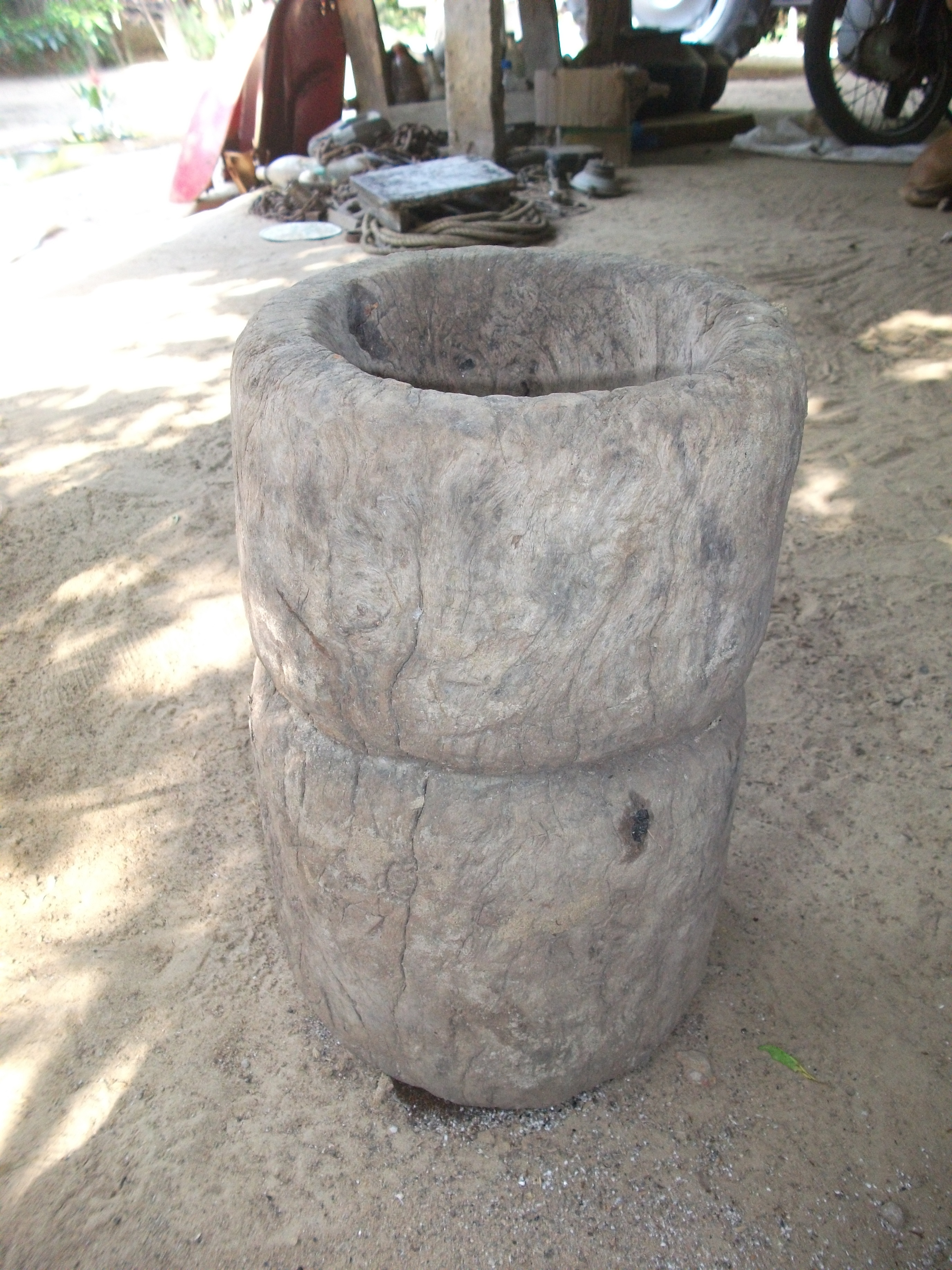
Wooden ual

Ual (pronounced as woo-aal), also known as Ural, is a sand clock-shaped grinding tool used by the Bodo people.

Since forests have abounded in Assam for centuries, wood is used to make an ual. From a tree trunk, a circular core is carved out and sand-clock counter is achieved by trimming its outer belly. The tool for ramming the contents within an ual is also made of wood. It's a long cylindrical tool which is provided with a trough at an appropriate position for holding it. The two ends of the ramming tool is clipped with circular metal rings for its longevity.

The Bodos use the ual basically for grinding grains such as rice. The ground rice can then be used for making different cuisines like onla or pitha. Other things such as a mixture of leaves or dry fish are also ground using an ual.
