= List of Sahitya Akademi Award winners for Bodo =

List of winners of a literary honor in India

Sahitya Akademi Award for Bodo
- Award for contributions to Bodo literature
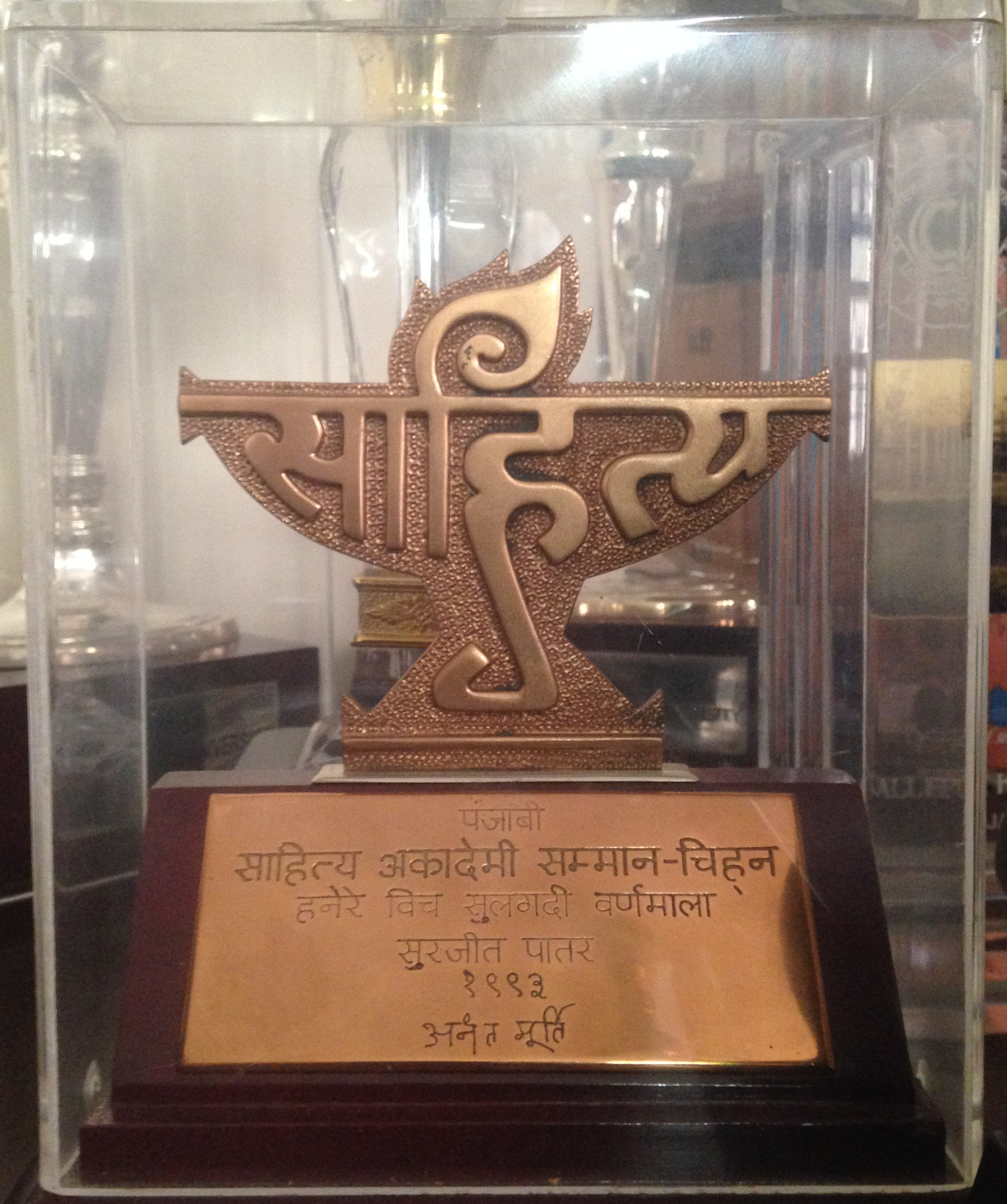
- Awarded for: Literary award in India
- Sponsored by: Sahitya Akademi, Government of India
- Reward: ₹1 lakh (US$1,100)
- First award: 2005
- Final award: 2024

Highlights
- Total awarded: 20
- First winner: Mangal Singh Hazowary
- Most Recent winner: Nandeswar Daimari
- Website: Official website

Part of a series on

Sahitya Akademi Awards
Category
Sahitya Akademi Award winners by language
- Assamese
- Bengali
- Bodo
- Dogri
- English
- Gujarati
- Hindi
- Kannada
- Kashmiri
- Konkani
- Maithili
- Malayalam
- Marathi
- Meitei (Manipuri)
- Nepali
- Odia
- Punjabi
- Rajasthani
- Sanskrit
- Santali
- Sindhi
- Tamil
- Telugu
- Urdu
Sahitya Akademi Translation Prizes
- Assamese
- Bengali
- Bodo
- Dogri
- English
- Gujarati
- Hindi
- Kannada
- Kashmiri
- Konkani
- Maithili
- Malayalam
- Marathi
- Meitei (Manipuri)
- Nepali
- Odia
- Punjabi
- Rajasthani
- Sanskrit
- Santali
- Sindhi
- Tamil
- Telugu
- Urdu
Sahitya Akademi Yuva Puraskar
- Assamese
- Bengali
- Bodo
- Dogri
- English
- Gujarati
- Hindi
- Kannada
- Kashmiri
- Konkani
- Maithili
- Malayalam
- Meitei (Manipuri)
- Marathi
- Nepali
- Odia
- Punjabi
- Rajasthani
- Sanskrit
- Santali
- Sindhi
- Tamil
- Telugu
- Urdu
Sahitya Akademi Bal Sahitya Puraskar
- Assamese
- Bengali
- Bodo
- Dogri
- English
- Gujarati
- Hindi
- Kannada
- Kashmiri
- Konkani
- Maithili
- Malayalam
- Meitei (Manipuri)
- Marathi
- Nepali
- Odia
- Punjabi
- Rajasthani
- Sanskrit
- Santali
- Sindhi
- Tamil
- Telugu
- Urdu
Related
- Eighth Schedule to the Constitution of India
- Official Languages Commission
- List of languages by number of native speakers in India

Sahitya Akademi Award for Bodo language is given each year, since 2005, by Sahitya Akademi (India's National Academy of Letters), to writers and their works, for their outstanding contribution to the Bodo language.

== Winners ==
Key
# Posthumous recipient

Year	Portrait	Author	Book	Category of Book	Ref.
2005		Mangal Singh Hazowary	Jiuni Mwgthang Bisombi Arw Aroj	Poetry	
2006	—	Katindra Swargiary	Sanmwkhangari Lamajwng	Novel	
2007	—	Janil Kumar Brahma	Dumphaoni Phitha	Short Stories	
2008	—	Bidyasagar Narzary	Birgwsrini Thungri	Novel	
2009	—	Manoranjan Lahary	Dainee?	Novel	
2010	—	Aurobindo Uzir	Swdwbni Swler	Poetry	
2011	—	Premananda Mosahari	Okhafwrni Dwima	Poetry	
2012	—	Guneswar Musahary	Boro Khonthai	Poetry	
2013	—	Anil Boro	Delphini Onthai Mwdai Arw Gubun Gubun Khonthai	Poetry	
2014		Urkhao Gwra Brahma	Udangnifrai Gidingfinnanei	Poetry	
2015	—	Brajendra Kumar Brahma	Baidi Dengkhw Baidi Gab	Poetry	
2016	—	Anjali Narzary	Ang Maboroi Dong Dasong	Poetry	
2017	—	Rita Boro	Thwisam	Novel	
2018	—	Rituraj Basumatary	Dwngse Lama	Short Stories	
2019	—	Phukan Ch. Basumatary	Akhai Athumniphrai	Poetry	
2020	—	Dharanidhar Owari	Gwthenay Lamayao Gwdan Agan	Short Stories	
2021	—	Mwdai Gahai	Khoro Sayao Arw Himalay	Poetry	
2022	—	Rashmi Choudhury	Sansrini Modira	Poetry	
2023	—	Nandeswar Daimari	Jiu-Safarni DakhwnSarni	Short Stories	
2024	—	Aron Raja	Swrni Thakhai	Novel	
2025		Sahaisuli Brahma	Dwngnwi Lama Mwnse Gathwn	Novel	

== See also ==
- Boro language (India)
- Literature from North East India
- List of Indian writers
- List of Indian poets
