= Mangal Singh Hazowary =

Indian Bodo language poet (born 1954 in silbari, Bijni)

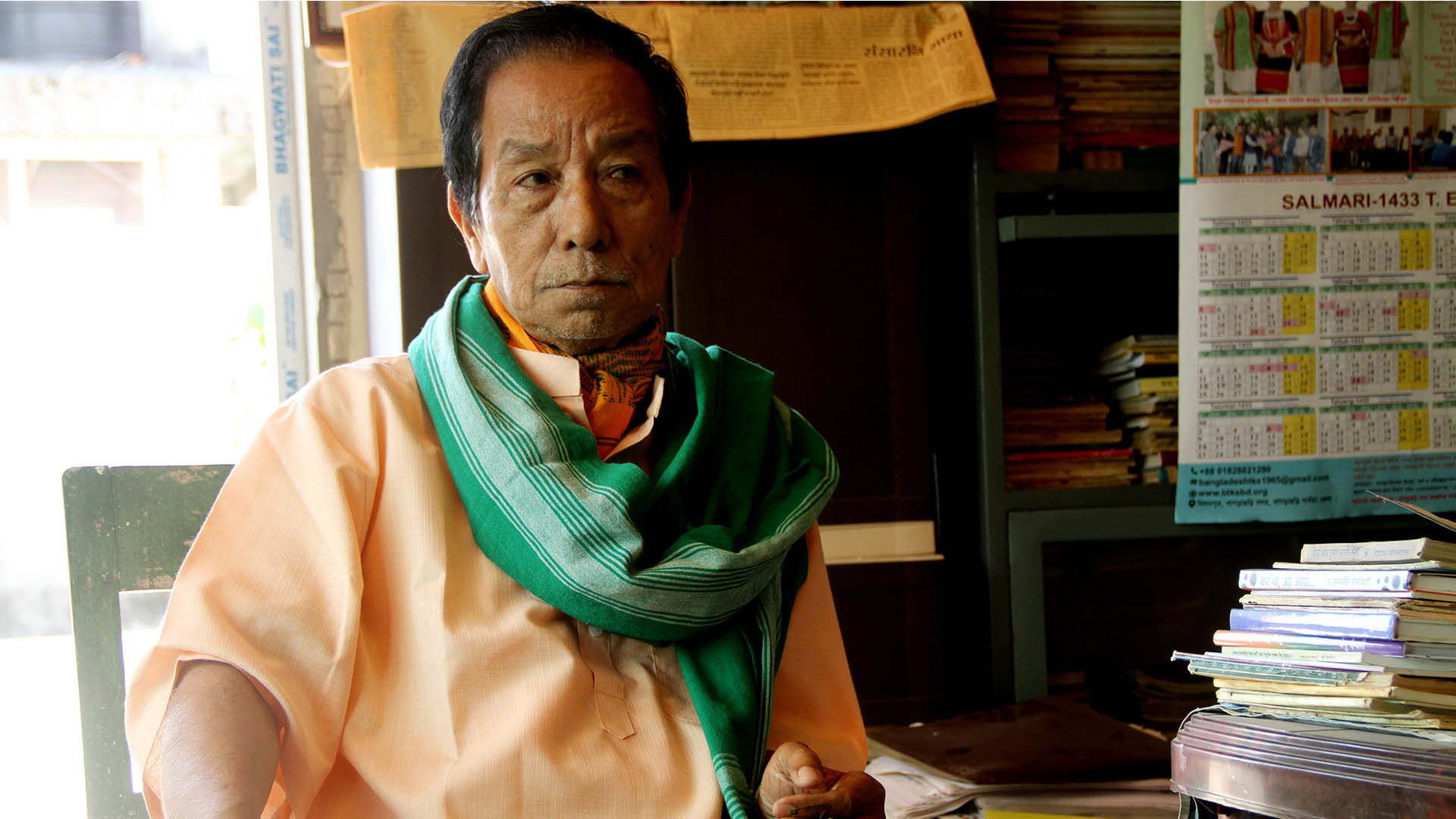
- Mangal Singh Hazowary in Kokrajhar 2023
- Born: 2 March 1954 (age 72); Silbari, Assam, India
- Occupation: Poet
- Writing career
- Language: Bodo language
- Notable work: Ziuni Mwkthang Bisombi Arw Aroj
- Notable awards: Sahitya Akademi Award, 2005; Padma Shri, 2021

Mangal Singh Hazowary is an Indian Bodo language poet. He is recipient of Sahitya Akademi Award for his poetry "Ziuni Mwkthang Bisombi Arw Aroj" in 2005. The Government of India awarded him the fourth highest civilian honour of the Padma Shri, in 2021, for his contributions to literature and education in the state of Assam.
