= Basumatary =

Indian Boro language surname

Origin
- Languages: Sanskrit, Boro
- Meaning: Earth-Bender
- Region of origin: Assam, India

Other names
- Variant forms: Basumatari, .Bwisumathiary

Basumatary or Basumatari is a surname found among the majority Boro people of north-eastern India. Basumatary comes from the word Biswamutiyari, meaning Earth-folk. The members of the clan cannot bury their dead or erect a funeral pyre without paying a token amount to Mother Earth through Basumatarys. Basumatary is derived from the Hindu earth goddess Bwiswmuti (Bhudevi), consort of Varaha (third incarnation of Vishnu). She is the mythical mother of the Boro people.

The mythical dynasty of Boros, the Bhauma dynasty derived its name from Bhudevi/biswamuti. Bhauma dynasty was founded by mythical Bodo/Boro hari (including most of the tribes, e.g. Karbi, Naga, Rabha, Kok Borok, Mizo,Deuri and others)/Boro king Narakasura, the son of Baraha and Bwiswmuti. All Kamrupa kings drew their lineage from Narakasura and called themselves as Baro Raja(king of Boros).

== Notable people ==
People with this surname include:

- Dharanidhor Basumatari - Indian politician.
- Hagrama Mohilary (alias Hagrama Basumatary) - Chief of Bodoland Territorial Council.
- Hitesh Basumatary - Indian politician.
- Sansuma Khunggur Bwiswmuthiary - Indian politician in Lok Sabha.
- Rajni Basumatary - Indian actress and filmmaker.

== See also ==
- Bodo people
- Bodo Sahitya Sabha
- Bodo language
- Narzary
