= Satish Chandra Basumatary =

Indian Bodo poet (1901–1974)

- Born: 16 November 1901; Dhubri, Assam, India
- Died: 16 November 1974 (aged 73); Kokrajhar, Assam
- Occupation(s): Poet, dramatist, social worker

Satish Chandra Basumatary (16 November 1901 – 16 November 1974) was an Indian Bodo poet, dramatist, social worker and the second president of Bodo Sahitya Sabha. He was a pioneer of the Bibar era, the age of renaissance of Bodo literature. He is credited with helping establish Bodo Brahma Dharma. He was also the editor of the first Bodo magazine Bibar in 1924. He was honoured with Mengnw Rwngwi Jwhwlao title after his death.

== Early life ==
He was born on 16 November 1901 at Balukmari village in Dhubri district (present Kokrajhar) into Bodo family Thandaram Basumatary and Khowlou Basumatary. He started schooling from Dhubri High School and later went to Cotton University, Guwahati. He died on 16 November 1974.

== Works ==
Drama

- Rani Laimuti (1924)
- Naifinjaywi
- Bikhani Or
- Dwrswn Jwhwlao (2005)
