= Brajendra Kumar Brahma =

Brajendra Kumar Brahm
- Occupation: litterateur
- Writing career
- Language: Bodo language
- Subject: Poetry
- Notable work: Baydi Denkho Baydi Gaab

Brajendra Kumar Brahma is an author who writes primarily in the Bodo language. He was honored with the Sahitya Akademi Award in 2015 for editing a poetry anthology, Baydi Denkho Baydi Gaab.

== See also ==
- Boro language (India)
- Literature from North East India
- List of Indian poets
