= Narzary =

Indian Bodo-language surname

Origin
- Language: Bodo
- Meaning: Narji-folk
- Region of origin: Assam, India

Other names
- Variant form: Narjinary

Narzary, originally known as Narzihary (derived from Narzi meaning Mulukhiyah and Hari meaning Clan), is a prominent lineage or surname within the Boro community, an indigenous ethnic group primarily residing in the Northeastern region of India, particularly in the state of Assam. The Narzary clan holds significant cultural, social, and historical importance within the Boro community, and is considered one of the most esteemed clans among them.

The Narjinari, or Narjinary are the alternative English spellings of the name, commonly used by the Boro community living in West Bengal and Nepal.

== Origin and Significance ==
The name "Narzary" is believed to have originated from the Boro language, with "Narzi" referring to Mulukhiya, a traditional dried jute leaf dish called "Narzi Wngkhri", and "Hari" signifying clan. Over time, the name Narzary became prevalent among the members of this lineage. The Narzary clan has traditionally been associated with the cultivation of jute plants, a vital economic activity within the Boro community. Additionally, historical records suggest that the Narzary clan played a significant role in the economic life of the community, often serving as moneylenders.

== Notable people ==
People with the surname Narzary who may or may not belong to this specific community include:

- Ostad Kamini Kumar Narzary, Indian Bodo folk dancer and choreographer.
- Anjali Narzary, Indian Bodo language poet.
- Charan Narzary, Indian politician.
- Halicharan Narzary, Indian footballer.
- Kamal Singh Narzary, Indian politician.
- Majendra Narzary, Indian politician.
- Kanakeswar Narzary, Indian politician.
- Rwngwra Narzary, Indian politician.
- Rashmi Narzary, Indian author.
- Nabajit Narzary, Dance India Dance Li'l Master Season 5 winner.

== See also ==
- Bodo people
- Bodo Sahitya Sabha
- Bodo language
- Basumatary
