= Anjali Narzary =

Indian Bodo language poet

- Occupation: Poet
- Writing career
- Language: Bodo language
- Subject: Poetry
- Notable work: Ang Mabwrwi Dong Daswng

Anjali Narzary is an Indian Bodo language poet. She is a recipient of Sahitya Akademi Award for her poetry "Ang Mabwrwi Dong Daswng" in 2016.

== See also ==
- Boro language (India)
- Literature from North East India
- List of Indian poets
