= Onla =

Cultural food

Onla (Bodo word) is one of the bodo cuisines made from rice flour, khardwi (alkali) and spices. Chicken or pork is sometimes added. Some of the famous onla dish are Aouwa Mewa onla (bamboo shoot with rice flour), sojona bilai onla( drumstick leaves with rice flour), sobai onla(black lentils with rice flour), mwithru bibar onla ( papaya flower with rice flour), mwithru onla( papaya fruits with rice flour), thaigir onla( elephant apple with rice flour) Onla can sometimes be made by just adding chicken, pork or fish without adding any herbs or vegetables.
