= Katindra Swargiary =

Bodo-language novelist

- Occupation: Novelist
- Writing career
- Language: Bodo language
- Subject: Novel
- Notable work: Sanmwkhangari Lamajwng
- Notable awards: Sahitya Akademi Award

Katindra Swargiary is an Indian Boro-language novelist. He is recipient of Sahitya Akademi Award for his novel "Sanmwkhangari Lamajwng" in 2006.

== See also ==
- Boro language (India)
- Literature from North East India
- List of Indian writers
