= Satish (criminal) =

Indian serial killer

- Born: Satish Kumar c. 1973; Ghaziabad, Uttar Pradesh, India
- Other name: "The Bahadurgarh baby killer"
- Occupation: Factory worker
- Status: In prison
- Convictions: Murder; Rape
- Penalty: Life sentence

Details
- Span of crimes: 1995–1998
- Country: India
- State: Haryana
- Location: Bahadurgarh
- Target: Girls aged 5–9 years
- Killed: 10
- Date apprehended: 20 November 1998

Satish Kumar (born c. 1973), better known simply as Satish, is a convicted Indian pedophile and serial killer who was active in Bahadurgarh in Haryana from 1995 to 1998. He admitted kidnapping and attempting to rape fourteen girls, murdering ten. Police confirmed Satish's involvement in twelve cases, including the ten murders. Since his victims were all five to nine years of age, he is also known as the Bahadurgarh baby killer.

The police's inability to apprehend Satish led to protests and near-riots by local residents. Under pressure, police prosecuted three men in succession as the murders continued. Satish was finally arrested in 1998 when his final victim led police to him. He was convicted of twelve sexual assaults and ten murders, and is serving a life sentence.

== Early life ==
Satish came to Bahadurgarh from Ghaziabad with his parents. He lived at the home of his father, Brij Pal, in Bahadurgarh's Netaji Nagar section. When Satish was arrested in 1998, he was 25 years old.

== Victims ==
Police confirmed that Satish was involved in kidnapping and raping (or attempting to rape) twelve young girls, ten of whom he killed:

#	Victim	Age (years)	Date of disappearance	Description
1	Pooja	8	16 February 1995	Went missing from Netaji Nagar. At 7:30 pm, she and members of her family went out of their house to watch a wedding procession. After the procession left, Pooja was missing. On 25 February, her decomposed body was found in a hut situated at a mustard field.
2	Sheetal	7	11–12 July 1995	On the night of 11–12 July, Sheetal, her uncle and her grandmother were sleeping in front of their house; her mother and two brothers were sleeping on the roof. Her father, a CRPF employee, was not home. At 3:00 am, her mother woke up and discovered that she was missing. On 14 July, Sheetal's partially-clothed body was found in a nearby enclosure. An autopsy indicated that she had been raped before she was killed.
3	Karuna (Kuki)	5–6	11 September 1995	Went missing from the vicinity of her house in Nehru Nagar. At about 1:00 pm, she went to a nearby shop to purchase salt and did not return. On 12 September, her body was found in a field in the village of Parnala.
4	Jony	6	14 October 1995	Jony's mother thought that she had gone out with her uncle, Sudesh, at 2:10 pm. When Sudesh returned home at 2:30, he told her that he had left Jony playing outside the house. After an unsuccessful search, Jony's mother reported her disappearance to the police at 9:15. At 2:00 pm the following day, her body was found.
5	Pinki	5	4 January 1996	Satish's first victim to survive, she was found unconscious in a vacant lot after he apparently left her for dead.
6	Sweta (Sweety)	6	9 January 1996	Sweta went out to play with other children but did not return home. Her sister, Anjana, told her mother that a bicyclist had taken her away but could not give a full description of the kidnapper. Another child, Charu, said that she was picked up by a person with a shawl on the pretext that her mother was calling her. On 10 January, her body was found in Parnala.
7	Salma (Janno)		12 June 1996	Janno was kidnapped, while she slept in front of her house with her parents. Her father, Salamudin, woke up at 4:00 pm and discovered that she was missing. Her family later found her body in a ditch of water near the Badro canal.
8	Shanti	5–6	14 March 1997	Shanti, the daughter of a Nepali who was working as a watchman at a local godown, went missing from her house. On the morning of 15 March, her body was recovered from a Parnala pond.
9	Manju	7	21 June 1997	Raped and murdered on 22 June 1997.
10	Komal (Kinty)	9	October 1997	Her nude body was found on 8 October 1997.
11	Aarti	9	6 September 1998	Satish kidnapped her from the Shankar Garden area while she and her family slept in an open compound. He took her to a drain across the fields, and attempted to rape her before strangling her. Aarti's father, Dinesh, was working the night shift at the Vijulka factory on the night of 6–7 September. At 3:00 am, his son came and told him that Aarti was missing; he then lodged a missing-person complaint at the M.I.E. Area police station. Aarti's body was found in a vacant lot in the M.I.E. Area on 9 September.
12	Somani	6	19 November 1998	Kidnapped while returning from her father's tea stall in front of a chappal factory. Satish raped her twice at his house. When she lost consciousness he threw her in a field, assuming that she was dead. On the morning of 20 November, a passerby found her weeping near a bridge and brought her to the police station. She led police to Satish's house, where he had kept her overnight.

After he was arrested, Satish admitted raping (or attempting to rape) 14 girls and killing 10 of them. He did not know the names of his victims. His confession is summarised below:

1. Kidnapped a girl between Ghevra turning and Nizampur village. Left her in the wheat field near the Bamnouli road.
2. Kidnapped a girl about 8–9 years old from a wedding reception at Gali No. 4, Netaji Nagar, at about 9:10 pm on a winter night. Took her to a mustard field, tried to rape her and strangled her.
3. Kidnapped a girl about 8–9 years old from Parnala. Took her to Bidoras, tried to rape her and strangled her.
4. Kidnapped a sleeping girl near the Bahadurgarh bus stand. Took her to Parnala, tried to rape her and murdered her.
5. Kidnapped a girl from a Ramlila event on Nahra Nahri Road. Took her to Kothra in Parnala and tried to rape her.
6. Kidnapped a girl from Nehru Park. Tried to rape her in a field in Dencha, between Parnala and Nizampur. Uncertain if she died.
7. Kidnapped a girl near a temple beside a road leading to Nehru Park. Took her to Kothra in Parnala village and tried to rape and murder her. Later he learned that she lived.
8. Kidnapped a girl from a school near a sabzi mandi on a summer day. Brought her towards Parnala, tried to rape her in a vacant lot and strangled her.
9. Kidnapped a girl about 7 years old from Shankar Garden. Took her to a park, tried to rape her and strangled her.
10. Kidnapped a 7–8-year-old girl near a pencil factory. Tried to rape her beside a nala near a bridge, and strangled her.
11. Kidnapped a girl from Bamnouli and brought her towards Chour Paiu. Tried to rape her near a pipal tree, murdered her and left her body.
12. Kidnapped a girl from her house in Shankar Garden. Brought her to a nala, tried to rape her and murdered her.
13. Kidnapped a girl from the M.I.E. Area at night. Took her to a vacant lot, tried to rape her and strangled her. Contrite, he approached her house and tried to awaken a woman.
14. Kidnapped a girl near a chappal factory around midday, brought her to his house and kept her there overnight. Tried to rape her twice. His young brother and sister were home, and Satish told them that the girl was the daughter of a contractor. The next morning he brought the girl to a vacant factory, tried to strangle her and ran away (this was Somani, who survived and led the police to him).

== Initial suspects ==
=== Raj Kumar ===
Satish's first victim was Pooja, who was killed in February 1995. Since her father was employed by the Union Home Ministry, the police were under pressure to apprehend the culprit quickly. They arrested Raj Kumar (also known as Raja), saying that he had confessed to the crime. Raja was cleared after being imprisoned for 18 months.

in July 1995, while Raja was still in police custody, Satish raped and killed a seven-year-old girl. After Satish's third crime in September 1995, the police began looking for a serial killer. When the fourth girl was murdered in October 1995, angry local residents organized dharnas. Authorities transferred the local police superintendent and intensified patrolling in the area. The police asked parents to keep an eye on their children (especially young girls) and report any suspicious persons, but there was no progress in the investigation.

=== Ram Babu ===
In January 1996, Satish kidnapped and raped two girls in five days. Local residents intensified their protests, organizing bandhs, so the deputy inspector general of police (DGP) and the district superintendent of police (SP) remained in Bahadurgarh to supervise the investigation. Police explored the possibility that the killer lived in neighbouring Delhi, and involved the Delhi Police in the investigation.

The Delhi Police arrested the possibly-intellectually-disabled Ram Babu, claiming the ₹50,000 reward announced by the Haryana police for the arrest of the "Bahadurgarh baby killer". Babu, of Bihar, was arrested at a roadside restaurant on the Delhi-Rohtak road near Nangloi.

The murders continued, indicating that Babu was not the killer. On 16 August 1998, three months before Satish was caught and after spending thirty months in prison, 32-year-old Ram Babu was killed in prison. Om Prakash, another prisoner in the mental ward, hit him on the head with a brick and killed him.

The senior superintendent of police (SSP) who interviewed Ram Babu later said:

In his 30s, neither did he appear mentally deranged nor given to perversity. He kept smiling through his "interrogation" and did not admit to remorse, even after "confessing" to having murdered 70 women. But we could not make out whether he was lying. He didn't make any admissions except when given "suggestions". When prompted, he talked with so much ease about how he disposed of the bodies of his victims that one tended to disbelieve him. The peculiar thing about him was that he sang lewd songs. He would talk about sex and the mere mention of a certain film actress would make him blush and indulge in an "expressed gratification" using verbal rhymes and making "appropriate and overt" sexual gestures. We consulted psychiatrists, who rubbished our theory by saying that regular sexual fantasising, in an overt or covert way, does create a kind of catharsis — resulting in the person being less likely to commit sexual assault.

=== Shankar Kumar ===
On 22 June 1997, Satish killed seven-year-old Manju. On 10 July the police arrested Shankar Kumar of Begusarai in Bihar, alleging that he had attempted to abduct Aarti (a young girl from Subhash Nagar in Bahadurgarh). According to Senior Superintendent of Police A. S. Chawla, Shankar admitted kidnapping and murdering Manju.

The arrest was again found premature when Satish raped and murdered nine-year-old Kinty, whose nude body was found on 8 October. Her discovery led to a violent public protest in Bahadurgarh the following day. In near-riot conditions, police opened fire on the crowd and two youths were killed. Nearby units of the Central Reserve Police Force were called in to assist local police, and the case was transferred to the CID. Because of the massive police presence in the city, Satish did not strike again for the next eleven months.

== Arrest ==
After nearly a year of inactivity, in September 1998 Satish kidnapped a nine-year-old girl from her family's compound at night. Deputy Superintendent of Police (DSP) Suman Manjari organized a citizens' anti-crime committee to increase awareness and mobilize support for police efforts. She met with the local chamber of commerce, who posted a ₹10,000 reward for helping police catch the killer.

On 18 November, Satish kidnapped six-year-old Somani when she was returning from her father's tea stall. Manjari supervised the search and the investigation, but could not make any headway. Satish raped Somani twice in his home; when she lost consciousness, he assumed she was dead and threw her into a field near his house.

Two days later, Umid Singh saw Somani weeping in a dry flood control channel near a bridge. He asked the girl her name and address, but she would only tell him her name. Singh brought her to the Modern Industrial Area police station. The local police, realizing that she was a probable victim of the "baby killer", informed Manjari. Somani told her that she had been kidnapped by a dark-skinned bicyclist with a thin beard, and led police to the house across the train tracks where she was kept overnight. Satish's brother told police that he was at work at a tin factory, where he was arrested.

After the arrest, the Haryana Police asked the Delhi Police to return the reward they had claimed. The Delhi Police returned the money, which was given to Somani.

== Conviction ==
According to the police, Satish appeared to be a "mentally deranged sex pervert". From 10 to 23 December 1998, he was observed by Dr. Rajiv Gupta at the Pandit Bhagwat Dayal Sharma Post Graduate Institute of Medical Sciences in Rohtak. Gupta concluded that Satish was not psychotic, but had a "neurotic type of personality". Satish admitted committing 14 crimes, and on 22 December a magistrate determined that his confession was voluntary. Although Satish later recanted his confession, he was convicted on the basis of evidence; the details he provided of the kidnappings, rapes and murders were corroborated by other evidence. In the Aarti murder case (victim number 11), he was questioned with lie-detection expert Dr. Bibha Rani on 1 December 1998 and his description of the crime matched the existing evidence.

Satish was sentenced to life imprisonment; the court did not find his crime the "rarest of the rare", which would have given him a death sentence. In 2008, the Punjab and Haryana High Court rejected the government of Haryana's request for a death sentence.

In the present case, the accused is already in custody for 10 years. The trial court thought it fit not to impose death sentence. The offence committed is very heinous and though, it may be one of the rarest cases, after weighing all the circumstances, taking a 'global' view, we are of the view that extreme penalty of death sentence is not called for. However, while affirming life imprisonment, we direct that the accused will not be released from custody before completion of 20 years of actual sentence.

== See also ==
- List of serial killers by country
- List of serial killers by number of victims
