= Bodo Sahitya Sabha =

Literary organization of the Bodo people

- बर' थुनलाइ आफाद/Boro Thunlai Afad
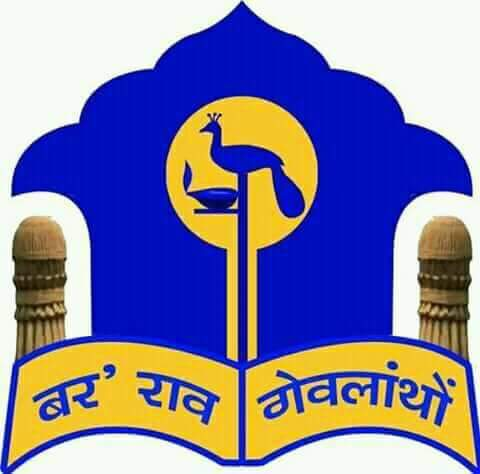
- logo of Bodo Sahitya Sabha
- Abbreviation: BSS
- Formation: 16 November 1952; 73 years ago
- Type: Non political organization
- Purpose: To promote Bodo culture and literature
- Headquarters: Rupnath Brahma Bhawan, Kokrajhar, Bodoland Territorial Region, Assam
- Coordinates: 26.2006°N 92.9376°E
- Region served: Bodoland
- Official language: Bodo
- President: Dr. Surath Narzary
- Secretary: Mr. Nilkanta Goyari

The Bodo Sahitya Sabha literary organization that promotes the Bodo language and Bodo literature.

It was founded under the presidency and leadership of Joy Bhadra Hagjer, at Basugaon, in the district of Goalpara, now in Chirang, Assam on 16 November 1952. It consisted of representatives of Assam, West Bengal, Meghalaya, Nagaland, Tripura and Nepal in abroad.

== Early work ==
After India obtained independence, a critical mass of Bodo intellectuals realized the need for preservation of Bodo language. Many early Bodo authors studied in schools and colleges, where medium of instruction was either Assamese or Bengali. Bodo intellectuals felt that Bodo language must be preserved and developed at par with Assamese and Bengali languages. Bodo people realized very late that the education was the key component to the overall development of Bodo people and their language. After prolonged struggle and determination of the Bodo Sahitya Sabha (Bodo Literary Organization), the Bodo language was introduced as a medium of instruction at primary level in 1963 and then at secondary level in 1968. Bodo language and literature has been recognized as one of the Major Indian Languages (MIL) in Gauhati, Dibrugarh and North-Eastern Hill Universities. In 2004, Bodo was recognized as an associated state official language of Assam.

== Bodo Sahitya Sabha celebration ==
The 58th Annual Conference of Bodo Sahitya Sabha commenced with a three-day programme at Daimalu High School playground, Gohpur in Biswanath district of Assam on 22 January 2019.

== Recent development ==
Now the language has attained a position of pride with the opening of the Post-Graduate Courses in Bodo language and literature in the University of Gauhati in 1996 and in Bodoland University, Kokrajhar. Moreover, under the aegis of the commission for Scientific and Technical terminology, HRD Ministry, the Govt. of India, the Bodo Sahitya Sabha is preparing more than forty thousand scientific and technical terms in Bodo language. Further, it is promised, the Sahitya Academy would accord "Bhasa Sonman"(respect for language) to the Bodo language and literature as an initial token of full-fledged recognition to it. Furthermore, the Govt. of India, in principle, has recognized the necessity of inclusion of the Bodo language and literature in the Eighth Schedule of the Constitution of India.

== Contributions ==
Moreover, the Bodo Sahitya Sabha has to its credit a large number of books in Bodo of prose, poetry, drama, short story, novel, biography, travelogue, children's literature & criticism.

Since 1993, it has been issuing a Someswari Brahma Literary Award, annually granted to writers and their works for their best creative writings in Bodo literature. Someswari Award is given out of the amount of Rs. 55, 000/- donated by Trailokya Brahma of Patakata. The Award carries an amount of Rs. 5,000/- with citation.

== Presidents ==
Joy Bhadra Hagjer	1952-1966
Satish Chandra Basumatary	1966-1968
Gauri Kt. Brahma	1968-1974
Ramdas Basumatary	1974-1977
Lakheswar Brahma	1977-1980
Ramdas Basumatary	1980-1983
Jogendra Kr. Basumatary	1983-1990
Kamal Kr. Brahma	1990-1993
Moni Ram Mochari	1993-1996
Bineshwar Brahma	1996-2000 (Aug.)
Daleswar Boro (Acting)	2000-2002 (Aug.)
Brojendra Kr. Brahma	2002-2008
Kameshwar Brahma	2008-2017
Taren Boro	2017–2023
Dr. Surath Narzary	2023- 2026

== See also ==
- Bodo people
- Bodo language
- Asam Sahitya Sabha
- Manipuri Sahitya Parishad
- All Bodo Students' Union
- Bodoland
