= Boro people =

Ethnolinguistic group in northeast India

Boro
Bara
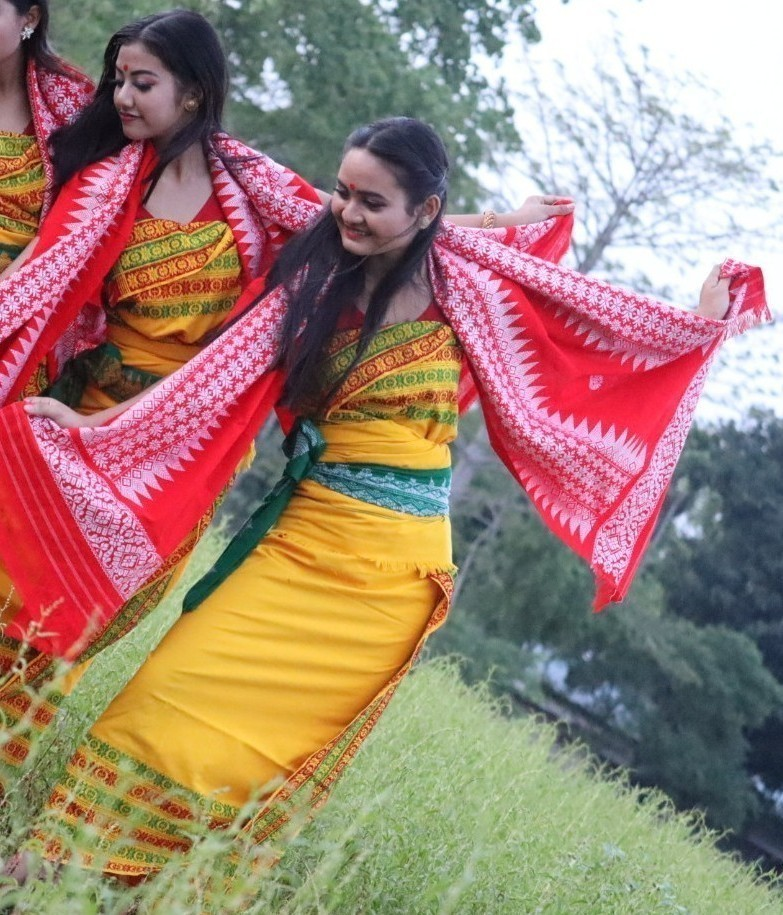
- Boro bwisagu dance in traditional attire

Total population
- 1.45 million (2011)

Regions with significant populations
- Assam, Meghalaya: 1.41 million (2011)

Languages
- Boro

Religion
- Bathouism, Hinduism, Christianity

Related ethnic groups
- Other Bodo–Kachari people

The Boro (बर'/बड़ो [bɔɽo]), also called Bodo, are a Tibeto-Burman speaking ethnolinguistic group native to the state of Assam in India. They are a part of the greater Bodo–Kachari family of ethnolinguistic groups and are spread across northeastern India. They are concentrated mainly in the Bodoland Territorial Region of Assam, though Boros inhabit all other districts of Assam and Meghalaya.

Boros were listed under both "Boro" and "Borokachari" in The Constitution (Scheduled Tribes) Order, 1950, and continue to be called so in the Census of India documents. Boros speak the Boro language, a Boro-Garo language of the Tibeto-Burman family, which is recognised as one of twenty-two Scheduled languages of India. Over two-thirds of the people are bilingual, speaking Assamese as second language. The Boro along with other cognate groups of Bodo-Kachari peoples are prehistoric settlers who are believed to have migrated at least 3,000 years ago. Boros are mostly settled farmers, who have traditional irrigation, dong.

The Boro people are recognised as a plains tribe in the Sixth Schedule of the Indian Constitution, and have special powers in the Bodoland Territorial Region, an autonomous division; and also as a minority people.

== Etymology ==
Boro is the self-designation or autonym of the community. Boro comes from Bara-fisa, which means "son of Bara", and Bara stands for "man" or "male member" of the group. In the cognate language Kokborok, Borok means man ('k' being a suffix for nouns) and so logically, Boro would mean man even in the Boro language. Generally, the word Boro means a man, in the wider sense Boro means a human being (but not specific to a female member of the family) in the languages used by the Bodo-Kachari peoples.

== Language ==
The Boro language is a member of the Sino-Tibetan language family. It belongs to the Boro–Garo group of the Tibeto-Burman languages branch of the Sino-Tibetan family. It is an official language of the state of Assam and the Bodoland Territorial Region of India. It is also one of the twenty-two languages listed in the Eighth Schedule of the Constitution of India.

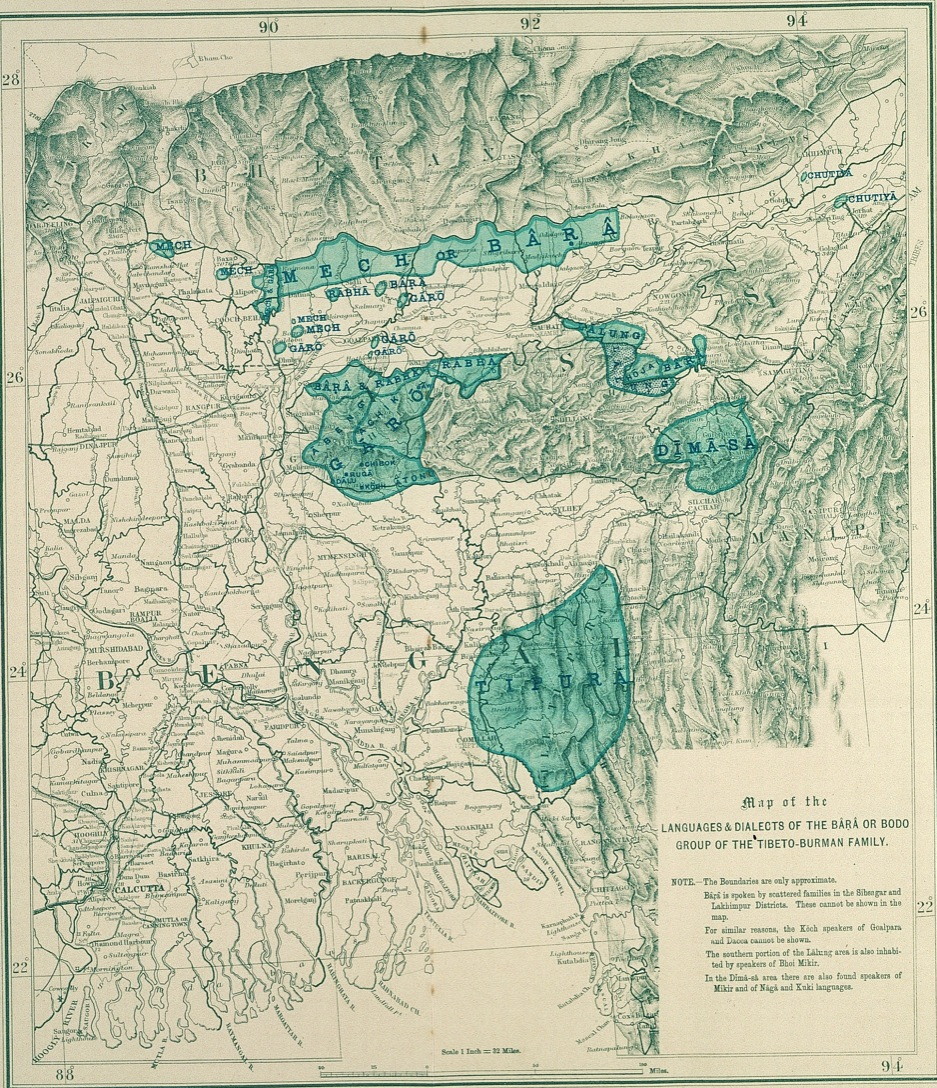
Distribution of people speaking Boro language, as reported in the Language Survey of India 1903

== Religion ==
Traditionally, Boros practised Bathouism, which is the worshiping of supreme God, known as Obonglaoree. The shijou tree is taken as the symbol of Bathou and worshiped. It is also claimed as the supreme god. In the Boro language, Ba means five and thou means deep. Since Boros believe in the five mighty elements of God – land, water, air, fire, and ether – the number five has become significant in the Bathou culture, which is similar to the five elements of other Asian religions.

According to Bathouism, before the creation of the universe there was simply a great void, in which the supreme being 'Aham Guru', Anan Binan Gosai or Obonglaoree existed formlessly. Aham Guru became tired of living a formless existence and desired to live in flesh and blood. He descended on this great void with all human characteristics and created the universe.

In addition to Bathouism, Boro people have also been converted to Hinduism, especially Hoom Jaygya. For this worship through fire ceremony, a clean surface near a home or courtyard is prepared. Usually, worship offerings include a betel nut called a 'goi' and a betel leaf called a 'pathwi' or 'bathwi' and rice, milk, and sugar. Another important Hindu festival, the Kherai Puja, where an altar is placed in a rice field, is the most important festival of the Boros. However, caste and dowry practices are not practised by the majority of Boro Hindus, who follow a set of rules called Brahma Dharma.

A majority of the Bodo people still follow Bathouism, but in censuses, they are often classified as Hindus, as their native religion has no official recognition under the Indian constitution.

Christianity is followed by around 10% of the Boros and is predominantly of the Baptist denomination. The major Boro Churches associations are the Boro Baptist Convention and Boro Baptist Church Association.

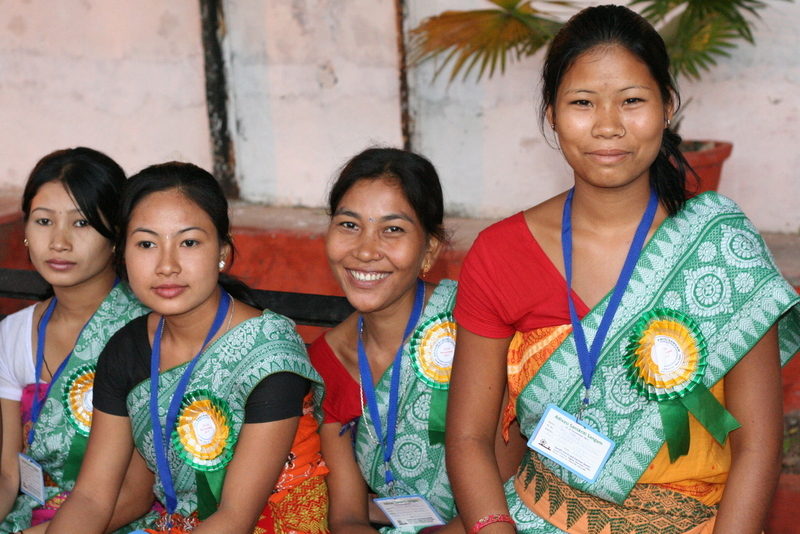
A group of Boro women at Delhi

== History ==
After the break-up of Kamarupa around the 12th century till the colonial times (19th century) and beyond different ethnic groups settled in different ecological regions but the constant movements and intermixing of peoples led to the development of distinctive but hybrid cultural practices. According to Saikia (2012), even as different state systems emerged, expanded, and fell—such as the Mughals, the Koch, the Ahoms, and British colonialism—the Boros resisted entry into their fiscal systems and moved slowly but continuously to avoid them. Due to the expansion of these states and the expansion of tenured peasantry, the Boros were those who finally converged close to the forested regions of the lower Himalayan foothills.

In this habitat, the Boros practised shifting cultivation for self-sustenance and controlled forest products. To cultivate in this difficult terrain the Boros developed innovative low-cost irrigation systems that supported shifting cultivation. Landholding, sowing and harvesting, irrigation, and hunting were all performed collectively. As those who controlled forest based produce, they emerged as intermediaries in the trade in these as well as other goods between the plains and the hills and complex relationships developed. The Boros remained shifting cultivators at least till the 18th century and then slowly became less mobile; even during the colonial period, most Boros refused permanent land tenure or made no effort to secure landholding documents.

When the Koch dynasty (1515–1949) consolidated its rule in the 16th century into the regions that the Boro people had settled in, it demarcated the region north of the Gohain Kamal Ali—which came to be called the Duars—as the region where non-Brahmin culture could thrive. After the Ahom kingdom consolidated its power in western Assam in the 17/18th century it made special arrangements with Bhutan to share administrative and fiscal responsibilities. But when the British banned forest lands from being used for cultivation in the last quarter of the 19th century the Boros suffered a major habitat loss since the forest lands historically used for shifting cultivation and the source of other produce suddenly became unavailable to them. To alienate indigenous peasants from their lands was a stated colonial aim, to make them available as labour in other enterprises.

=== Boro identity formation ===
Boros identity formation began in the colonial period, when the Boro elite and intelligentsia began differentiating themselves from the Assamese caste-Hindu society. The Boro, as well as many other communities as also much of the indigenous elite, were not exposed to education till the end of the 19th century, and it was by the early 20th century when a class of Boro/Kachari publicists finally emerged—a small Kachari elite formed in the early 20th century from among traders, school teachers and contractors. Foremost among them was Kalicharan Brahma, a trader from Goalpara who established a new monotheistic faith called "Brahma-ism" and most importantly, claimed for himself and his peers a new Bodo Identity. Whereas earlier educated Kacharis like Rupnath had few options for social mobility other than assimilating into the Hindu lower castes, thus the Brahma religion developed by the Bodos that asserted respectable and autonomous Bodo identity while rejecting the cast dominance, and by the 1921 census the Boros began giving up their tribal names and identifying themselves as Boro by caste and language and Brahma by religion. Additional avenues, via conversion to Christianity, were already available by the late 19th century especially with the evangelical work of Sidney Endle who is also known for his tome "The Kacharis", and this formed a parallel stream of Boro articulation till much later times.

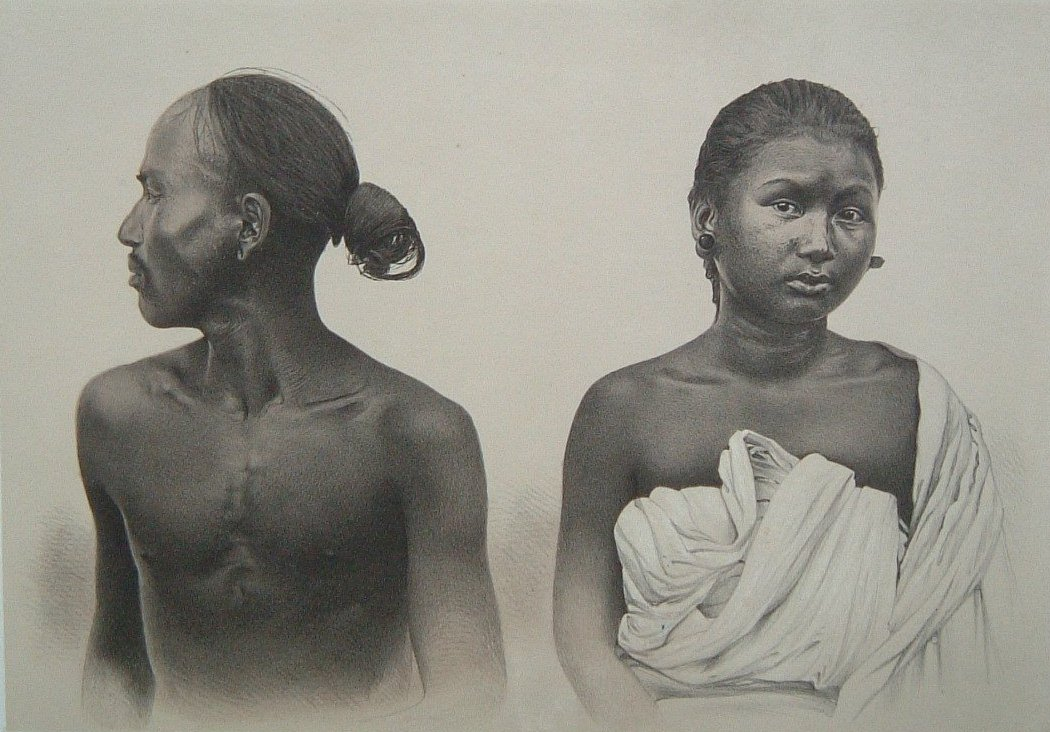
British era photo of a Boro couple.

Boro as a self-referential term for all Kacharis was reported by Montgomery in 1838. Bodo was a term reported by Brian Houghton Hodgson (1847) as a endonym that, he speculated, encompassed a wide group of peoples that included in the minimum the Mech and the Kacharis. This led to two type of approaches to the Boro identity: one is the notion of a wide group was picked up by Kalicharan Brahma and his peers who posited the Boro identity in opposition to the caste-Hindu Assamese, and the other one, Jadunath Khakhlari who accepted the notion for the greater Bodo race but at the same time criticised it as a neologism and insisted on the use of the name Kachari and pointed to the Kachari's contribution to the Assamese culture to underline their historical political legacy. Those of the Kacharis who preferred to progress socially by initiation into the Ekasarana Dharma are called Sarania Kachari and are not considered as Boros today.

=== Pre-political Boro associations ===
The period from 1919 saw the emergence of different Boro organisations: Bodo Chatra Sanmilan (Bodo Students Association), Kachari Chatra Sanmilan (Kachari Students Association), Bodo Maha Sanmilan (Greater Bodo Association), Kachari Jatiyo Sanmilan (Kachari Community Association), etc. These organisations pushed divergent means for social and political progress. For example, Bodo Chatra Sanmilan advocated giving up tribal attributes and wanted women to follow the ideals of Sita of Ramayana. Even as self-assertive politics was on, the Boros were not ready to severe their relationship with the greater Assamese society, with even Kalicharan Brahma advocating Assamese as the medium of instruction in schools, and Boro associations seeking patronage from Assamese figures who showed sympathy for their cause. In the absence of an acknowledged past history of state formation, the associations felt particularly pressed to show that the Boros were not primitive as some other tribal groups and at the same time did not fall into the caste-Hindu hierarchy.

The demand for community rights was made for the first time when at the 1929 Simon Commission the Boro leaders evoked colonial imagery of backward tribes and requested protection in the form of reserved representation in local and central legislatures. The Boro delegation to the Simon Commission included, among others, Kalicharan Brahma and Jadav Khakhlari. The delegation submitted that Goalpara should remain with Assam and should not be included with Bengal; and that the Boros were culturally close to the Assamese. (Note: "Goalpara is a part and parcel of Assam and history will prove what part she has been playing since the time immemorial. The habits and customs of the people of this district are more akin to Assamese than to Bengalis. We the Bodos can by no means call ourselves other than Assamese. The transfer of this district to Bengal will be prejudical to the interest not only of this community, but all the other communities, and this transfer will seriously hamper our progress in all directions." - part of the text of the memorandum to the Simon Commission.)

=== Boros in colonial tribal politics ===
The only human category in the pre-colonial times was jati. In the early 19th century the East India Company became interested in the 'tribal' question owing to situations arising out of insurgencies against local rulers who were seeking British protection; but over the years the East India Company/British Raj evolved its role as saviours of the not the local rulers but the local people by offering to protect them against these rulers just as the primitive people of Africa needed protection. The notion of primitive vs non-primitive difference was further refined by the introduction of European notions of racial differences and by the census of 1872, categories such as 'aboriginal tribe' and 'semi-Hinduised aboriginals' emerged. The 1881 census proposed that India consisted of two hostile populations and thus did not possess a cohesive nationality. And by 1901 the official definition of a tribe was set down by Risley. Within this formulation Northeast India was seen as a special case that required separate legislation.

The elites from these social groups, including that from the Boros, used these categories for political articulation. The Tribal League, a full political organisation, emerged in 1933 as the common platform for all plains tribes of the Brahmaputra valley that included the Boro, Karbi, Mising, Tiwa and the Rabha. This formation excluded the hills tribes which were not allowed political participation. The colonial state and ethnographers' desire to define the tribal people, the need of the people to define themselves, and the earlier pre-political associations were significant contributory factors in the development of the tribal identity among the Boro and other groups.

The Tribal League, which included Boro leaders such as Rabi Chandra Kachari and Rupnath Brahma, succeeded in protecting the Line system in 1937 against the proposal by the Muslim League.

== Demographics ==
Around 1.45 million Bodos are living in Assam, thus constituting 4.53% of the state population. A majority of them around 68.96% alone are being concentrated in Bodoland Territorial Region of Assam, numbering 1 million out of total 3.15 million population, thus constituting 31% of the region's population. In Bodoland's capital Kokrajhar, they are in minority, forming only 25% of the town's population.

== Folk tradition and mythology ==
The history of the Boro people can be explained from folk traditions. According to Padma Bhushan winner Suniti Kumar Chatterjee, mythologically, Boros are "the offspring of son of the Vishnu (Baraha) and Mother-Earth (Basumati)" who were termed "Kiratas" during the Epic period.

== Boro clans or surnames ==
Aroi or Ari or Ary is a suffix in Boro language, which means folk.

Some of the important clans of Boros are:

1. Swargiary: The priestly clan, with Deoris and Ojhas selected from this clan.
2. Basumatary: The land-holding clan.
3. Narzary: The clan associated with the jute cultivation and supply.
4. Mosahary: This clan is associated with the protection of cattle.
5. Goyary: This clan is associated with the cultivation of areca nuts.
6. Owary: This clan is associated with the supply of bamboos.
7. Khakhlary: This clan is associated with the supply of Khangkhala plant required for kherai puja.
8. Daimary: This clan is associated with the river.
9. Lahari: This clan is associated with the collection of leaves in large quantities for the festival.
10. Hajoary: The Boros that lived in the hills and foothills.
11. Kherkatari: The Boros associated with thatch and its supply, found mostly in Kamrup district.
12. Sibingari: The Boros traditionally associated with raising and supply of sesame.
13. Bingiari: The Boros associated with musical instruments.
14. Ramchiary: Ramsa is place name in kamrup. It is the name by which Boros were known to their brethren in the hills.
15. Mahilary: This clan is associated with collection of tax from Mahallas. Mahela and Mahalia are the variant forms of Mahilary clan.

== Gallery ==
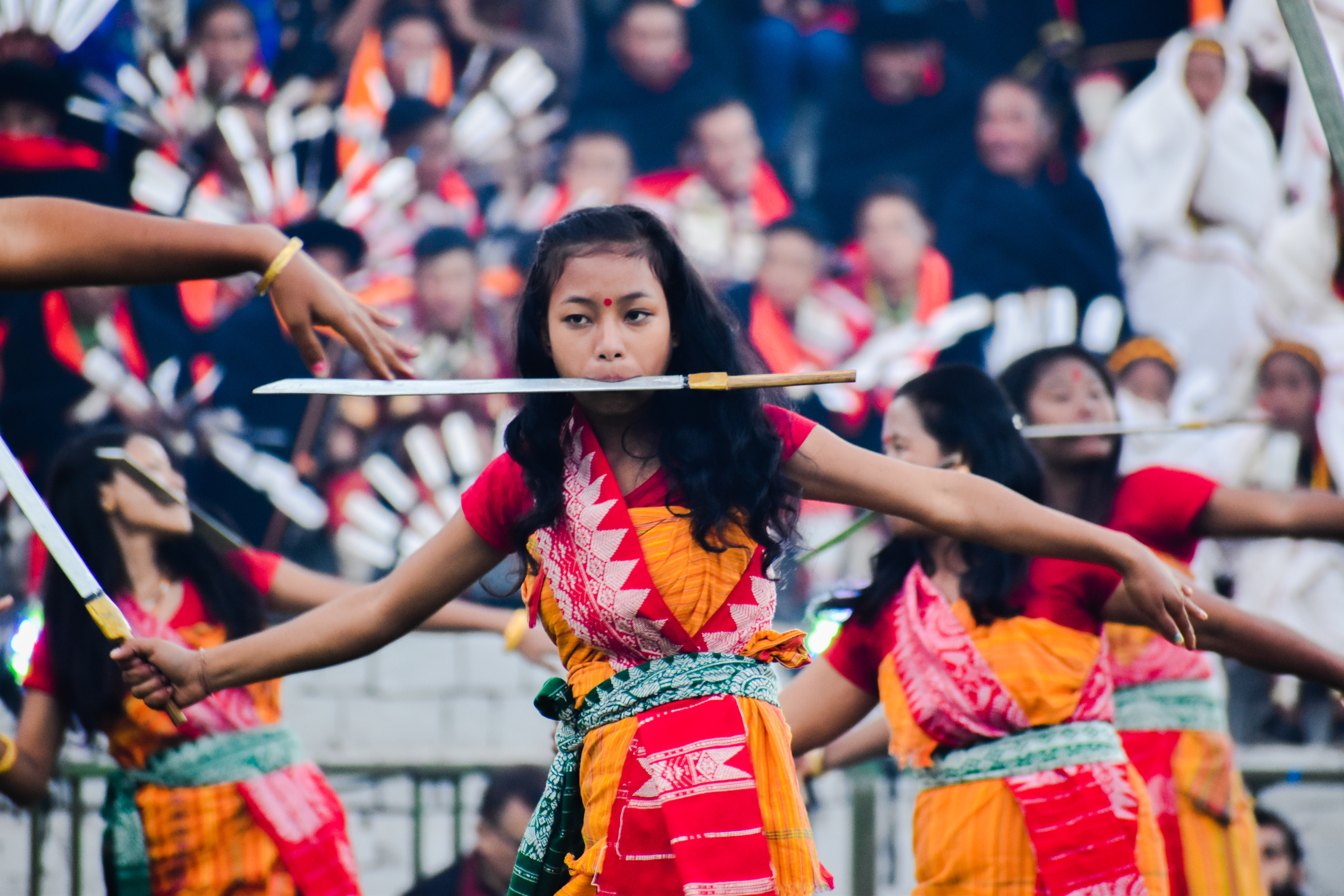
Boro women at Hornbill Festival

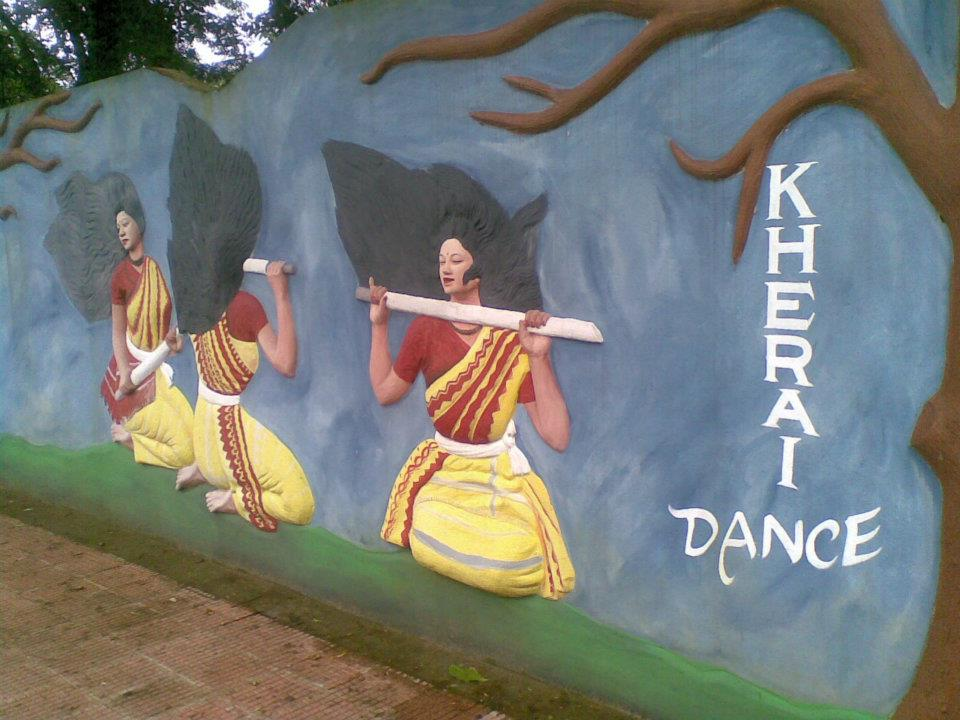
Kherai Group Dance

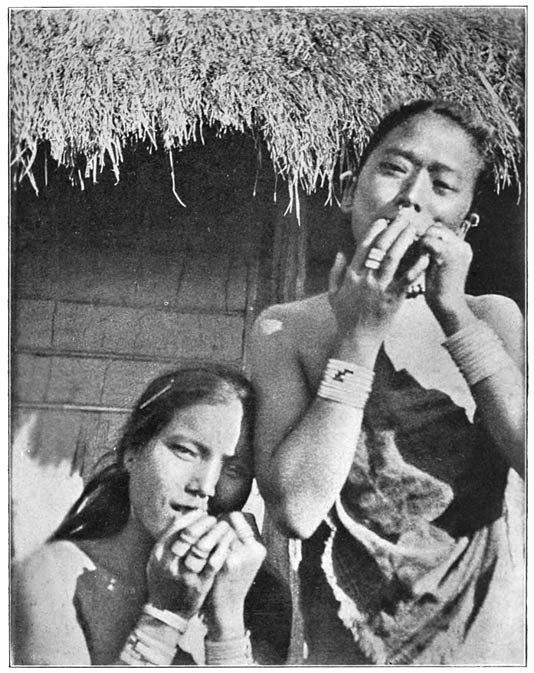
Boro woman playing harp

== Notable people ==
- Rajni Basumatary Filmmaker and actress
- Ankushita Boro, Indian boxer
- Jamuna Boro, Indian boxer
- Pramod Boro, Former President of ABSU, President of UPPL, CEM of Bodoland Territorial Council
- Harishankar Brahma 19th Chief Election Commissioner of India
- Upendra Nath Brahma, Boro activist, known by the title Bodofa
- Sansuma Khunggur Bwiswmuthiary, former Member of parliament
- Hagrama Mohilary, president of Bodoland People's Front political party and former Chief Executive Member of Bodoland Territorial Council.
- Ranjit Shekhar Mooshahary, former governor of Meghalaya, retired IPS officer, former director-general of National Security Guards (NSG) and the Border Security Force (BSF)
- Halicharan Narzary, Indian footballer
- Proneeta Swargiary Dance India Dance (season 5) Winner

== See also ==
- Bodo Sahitya Sabha
- Bodo culture
- Ual (tool)

== Bibliography ==
- Brahma, Kameswar (1998). A Study in Cultural Heritage of the Boros. Assam Institute of Research for Tribals and Scheduled Castes.
- Brahma, Nirjay Kumar (2008). "Introduction: Interpretation of Bodo or Boro". Socio political institutions in Bodo society (PhD). Guwahati University. hdl:10603/66535.
- Daimari, James (2022). Colonial Knowledge and the Quest for Unnati among the Boros of North-East India, 1880s-1940s (PhD thesis). IIT Guwahati.
- Daimari, Mizinksa; Bedamatta, Rajshree (2021). "The State of Bodo Peasantry in Modern-Day Assam: Evidence from Majrabari Village in the Bodoland Territorial Area Districts". The Indian Journal of Labour Economics. 64 (3): 705–730. doi:10.1007/s41027-021-00328-8. S2CID 240506155.
- Das, Debarshi; Saikia, Arupjyoti (2011). "Early Twentieth Century Agrarian Assam: A Brief and Preliminary Overview". Economic and Political Weekly. 46 (41): 73–80. JSTOR 23047190.
- DeLancey, Scott (2012). Hyslop, Gwendolyn; Morey, Stephen; w. Post, Mark (eds.). "On the Origin of Bodo–Garo". Northeast Indian Linguistics. 4: 3–20. doi:10.1017/UPO9789382264521.003. ISBN 978-93-82264-52-1.
- Dikshit, K. R. (2013). North-East India: Land, People and Economy. Springer Science & Business Media. pp. 375–376. ISBN 978-94-007-7055-3.
- Gupta, Sanjukta Das (2019). "Imagining the 'Tribe' in Colonial and Post-colonial India". Politeja. 16 (2(59)): 107–121. doi:10.12797/Politeja.16.2019.59.07. hdl:11573/1366269. JSTOR 26916356. S2CID 212430509.
- Jacquesson, François (2008). "Discovering Boro-Garo" (PDF). History of an Analytical and Descriptive Linguistic Category. Archived from the original (PDF) on 3 August 2019.
- Mosahary, R N (1983). "The Boros: Their Origin, Migration and Settlement in Assam" ( (PDF)). Proceedings of Northeast India History Association. Barapani: Northeast India History Association. pp. 42–70. Archived from the original on 1 July 2019.
- Pathak, Suryasikha (2010). "Tribal Politics in the Assam: 1933-1947". Economic and Political Weekly. 45 (10): 61–69. JSTOR 25664196.
- Pathak, Suryasikha (2012). "Ethnic Violence in Bodoland". Economic and Political Weekly. 47 (34): 19–23. JSTOR 41720055.
- Ramirez, Philippe (2014). People of the margins : across ethnic boundaries in North-East India. Guwahati: Spectrum. ISBN 978-81-8344-063-9.
- Saikia, Arupjyoti (2012). "The Historical Geography of the Assam Violence". Economic and Political Weekly (analysis). 47 (41): 15–18. JSTOR 41720234.
- Saikia, Simtana (2017). Explaining Divergent Outcomes of the Mizo and Bodo Conflicts in the Ethno-Federal Context of India's Northeast (PDF) (PhD). London: King's College.
- Sharma, Jayeeta (2011). Empire's Garden: Assam and the Making of India (PDF). Duke University Press.
