= Separatist movements of India =

Overview of separatist movements within the Republic of India

Secession in India typically refers to state secession, which is the withdrawal of one or more states from the Republic of India. Whereas, some have wanted a separate state, union territory or an autonomous administrative division within India. Many separatist movements exist with thousands of members, however, some have low local support and high voter participation in democratic elections. However, at the same time, demanding separate statehood within under the administration of Indian union from an existing state can lead to criminal charges under secession law in India.

Region of the prominent separatist movement in India

The Khalistan movement in Indian Punjab was active in the 1980s and 1990s, but was suppressed by the Indian Army. Secessionist movements in Northeast India involve multiple armed separatist factions operating in the Indian northeastern states which are connected to the rest of India by the Siliguri Corridor, a strip of land as narrow as 23 km (14.3 mi) wide. Northeastern India consists of the seven states of Assam, Meghalaya, Tripura, Arunachal Pradesh, Mizoram, Manipur, and Nagaland. Tensions existed between insurgents in these states and the central government as well as amongst their native indigenous people and migrants from other parts of India. Insurgency has seen rapid decline in recent years, with a 70% reduction in insurgency incidents and an 80% drop in civilian deaths in the Northeast in 2019 compared to 2013. Three ethnic groups of Meghalaya are demanding separate statehood like Garoland for Garo people, Khasi state for Khasi people and Jaintia state for Pnar people. The 2014 Indian general election the Indian government claimed it had an 80% voter turnout in all northeastern states, the highest among all states of India. Indian authorities claim that this shows the faith of the northeastern people in Indian democracy. Insurgency has largely become insignificant due to lack of local public support and the area of violence in the entire North East has shrunk primarily to an area which is the tri-junction between Assam, Arunachal Pradesh and north Nagaland. In contrast with the other insurgencies in Northeast India, Manipur-based militants are characterized by a low level of defections and a well organized intelligence network. They have also avoided targeting local police personnel, thus aiming to secure popular support.

Extortion remains the main source of funding for militant groups. Hindu Temples, educational institutions and businesses are known to have been targeted with illegal taxation. As many as 26 permanent tax collection checkpoints have been set up on the NH-39 and NH-53 National Highways. Militants have also resorted to abducting children and later employing them as child soldiers. On 3 May 2023, ethnic violence broke out in the state of Manipur between the Kuki and the Meitei people which killed more than 120 people and injured more than 3000 people and led to a resurgence of insurgent groups in the region.

Jammu and Kashmir has long been wracked by the insurgency since 1989. Although the failure of Indian governance and democracy lay at the root of the initial disaffection, Pakistan played an important role in converting the latter into a fully developed insurgency. Some insurgent groups in Kashmir support complete independence, whereas others seek accession to Pakistan. More explicitly, the roots of the insurgency are tied to a dispute over local autonomy. Democratic development was limited in Kashmir until the late 1970s and by 1988 many of the democratic reforms provided by the Indian government had been reversed and non-violent channels for expressing discontent were limited and caused a dramatic increase in support for insurgents advocating violent secession from India. In 1987, a disputed State election which is widely perceived to have been rigged, created a catalyst for the insurgency. In 2019, the special status of Jammu and Kashmir was revoked. Since then, the Indian military has intensified its counter-insurgency operations. Clashes in the first half of 2020 left 283 dead. The 2019–2021 Jammu and Kashmir lockdown was a security lockdown and communications blackout that had been imposed throughout Jammu and Kashmir which lasted until February 2021, with the goal of pre-emptively curbing unrest, violence and protests. Thousands of civilians, mostly young men, had and have been detained in the crackdown. The Indian government had stated that the tough lockdown measures and substantially increased deployment of security forces had been aimed at curbing terrorism.

India has introduced several laws like the Armed Forces Special Powers Acts (AFSPA) to subdue insurgency in certain parts of the country. The law was first enforced in Manipur and later enforced in other insurgency-ridden north-eastern states. It was extended to most parts of the Indian state of Jammu and Kashmir in 1990 after the outbreak of an armed insurgency in 1989. Each Act gives soldiers immunity in specified regions against prosecution under state government unless the Indian government gives prior sanction for such prosecution. The government maintains that the AFSPA is necessary to restore order in regions like Indian territories of Kashmir and Manipur. The act has been criticized by Human Rights Watch as a "tool of state abuse, oppression and discrimination". On 31 March 2012, the UN asked India to revoke AFSPA saying it had no place in Indian democracy.

== Causes ==
While the causes of the many insurgencies are varied, they can usually be explained by a few broad problems. Mainly, lack of development and democratic initiatives by the elected government and land, especially forest mismanagement. Also a lack of a consolidated unifying identity lead to exploitation of caste, ethnic, language or religious barriers. The counterinsurgency measures taken by the government have also often backfired leading to a mistrust in the state.

In Kashmir, democratic development was limited until the late 1970s and by 1988 many of the democratic reforms provided by the Indian government had been reversed and non-violent channels for expressing discontent were limited and caused a dramatic increase in support for insurgents advocating violent secession from India. In 1987, elections in Jammu Kashmir which have been widely perceived to be rigged caused mass civil unrests and demonstrations.

Religious or ethnic differences have also played a role in amplifying the insurgent movements. For example, after the Soviet withdrawal from Afghanistan, many Islamic "Jihad" fighters (Mujahideen) had entered the Kashmir valley and several new militant groups with radical Islamic views emerged. Militant groups like Hizbul mujahideen and Lashkar-e-Taiba asserted that struggle of Kashmir will continue till an Islamic Caliphate is achieved in Kashmir. Murder of Kashmiri Hindus, intellectuals, Pro-Indian politicians and activists were described necessary to get rid of un-Islamic elements. In Assam, tension exist between the native indigenous Assamese people and immigration from Bangladesh. The ULFA has attacked Hindi-speaking migrant workers. MULTA on the other hand seeks to establish an Islamic state in India via jihadist struggle of Muslims of both indigenous and migrant origin.

Geographical terrain also plays a major role as many militants are most active in the remote forest areas of India.

Finally, the various counter-insurgent movements initiated by the government has often backfired and resulted in more insurgency. A vicious cycle often happens where the government resorts to the use of excessive force resulting in even more people joining insurgent groups. Like, in the case of the Aizawl airstrike, Pu Zoramthanga, who went on to become the Chief Minister of Mizoram in 1998, once said that the main reason he joined the MNF and became a rebel was the "relentless bombing of Aizawl in 1966". In Kashmir, Human Rights Watch has stated in a 1993 report that Indian security forces "assaulted civilians during search operations, tortured and summarily executed detainees in custody and murdered civilians in reprisal attacks"; according to the report, militants had also targeted civilians, but to a lesser extent than security forces. Rape was regularly used as a means to "punish and humiliate" communities. In response, the Indian Army claims that 97% of the reports about the human rights abuse are "fake or motivated" based on the investigation performed by the Army. However, a report by the US State Department said, "Indian authorities use Armed Forces Special Powers Act (AFSPA) to avoid holding its security forces responsible for the deaths of civilians in Jammu and Kashmir." These human rights violations are said to have contributed to the rise of resistance in Kashmir. According to the Home Ministry, "A total of 120 incidents have been reported till July 15 this year while 188 incidents were reported last year. But what is causing a serious concern is the number of local terrorists getting killed indicating that recruitment is on the rise in the valley."

Acts intended to curb terrorism like the Armed Forces (Special Powers) Act and Unlawful Activities (Prevention) Act has been criticized by many human rights organizations. The South Asian Human Rights Documentation Centre argues that the governments' call for increased force is part of the insurgency problem.

This reasoning exemplifies the vicious cycle which has been instituted in the North East due to the AFSPA. The use of the AFSPA pushes the demand for more autonomy, giving the people of the North East more reason to want to secede from a state which enacts such powers and the agitation which ensues continues to justify the use of the AFSPA from the point of view of the Indian Government.

== Jammu and Kashmir ==
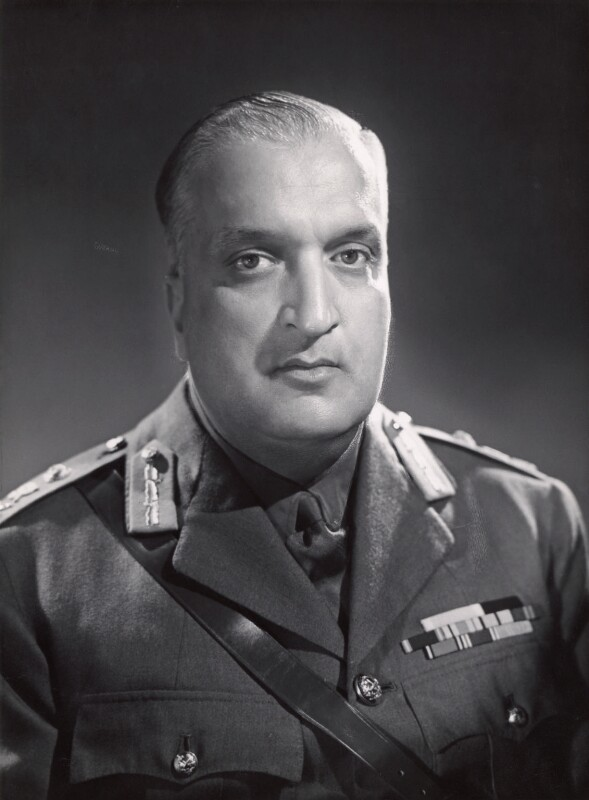
Maharaja of Kashmir, Hari Singh (1895–1961)

Maharaja Hari Singh became the ruler of the princely state of Jammu and Kashmir in 1925, and he was the reigning monarch after the British rule in the subcontinent in 1947. With the impending independence of India, the British announced that the British Paramountcy over the princely states would end, and the states were free to choose between the newly established Dominions of India and Pakistan. It was emphasized that independence was only a `theoretical possibility' because, during the long rule of the British in India, the states had come to depend on the British Indian government for a variety of their needs including their internal and external security.

Jammu and Kashmir had a Muslim majority (79% Muslim by the previous census in 1941) and following the logic of Partition, most people in Pakistan expected that Jammu and Kashmir would join Pakistan. However, the predominant political movement in the Valley of Kashmir (Jammu and Kashmir National Conference) was allied with the Indian National Congress - the founding movement of The Republic of India - since the 1930s. So some in India too had expectations that Kashmir would join India. The Maharaja was faced with indecision. (Note: Schofield (2003, p. 54): In his letter to Lord Mountbatten on 26 October 1947, the Maharaja wrote, "I wanted to take time to decide which Dominion I should accede... whether it is not in the best interests of both the Dominions and my State to stay independent, of course with cordial relations with both.)

On 22 October 1947, a Muslim nationalist uprising against the Maharaja broke out, with rebellious residents from the western jagir of Poonch and invading Pashtun tribesmen from the Northwest Frontier Province of what became Pakistan attacking state forces. The Maharaja initially fought back but appealed for assistance to India, who agreed on the condition that the ruler accede to India. Maharaja Hari Singh signed the Instrument of Accession on 26 October 1947 in return for military aid and assistance, which was accepted by the Governor-General the next day.

Once the Instrument of Accession was signed, Indian forces started entering the Kashmir with orders to evict the raiders. The resulting Indo-Pakistani War of 1947 lasted till the end of 1948. At the beginning of 1948, India took the matter to the United Nations Security Council. The Security Council passed a resolution asking Pakistan to withdraw its forces as well as the Pakistani nationals from the territory of Jammu and Kashmir, and India to withdraw the majority of its forces leaving only a sufficient number to maintain law and order, following which a plebiscite would be held. A ceasefire was agreed on 1 January 1949, supervised by UN observers. However, Pakistan has never complied with the resolution’s primary condition: the complete withdrawal of its troops and tribesmen from the territory of Jammu and Kashmir.

A special United Nations Commission for India and Pakistan (UNCIP) was set up to negotiate the withdrawal arrangements as per the Security Council resolution. The UNCIP made three visits to the subcontinent between 1948 and 1949, trying to find a solution agreeable to both India and Pakistan. It passed a resolution in August 1948 proposing a three-part process. It was accepted by India but effectively rejected by Pakistan. (Note: Korbel (1953, p. 502): "Though India accepted the resolution, Pakistan attached to its acceptance so many reservations, qualifications, and assumptions as to make its answer `tantamount to rejection'.) In the end, no withdrawal was ever carried out, India insisting that Pakistan had to withdraw first, and Pakistan contending that there was no guarantee that India would withdraw afterwards. No agreement could be reached between the two countries on the process of demilitarization.

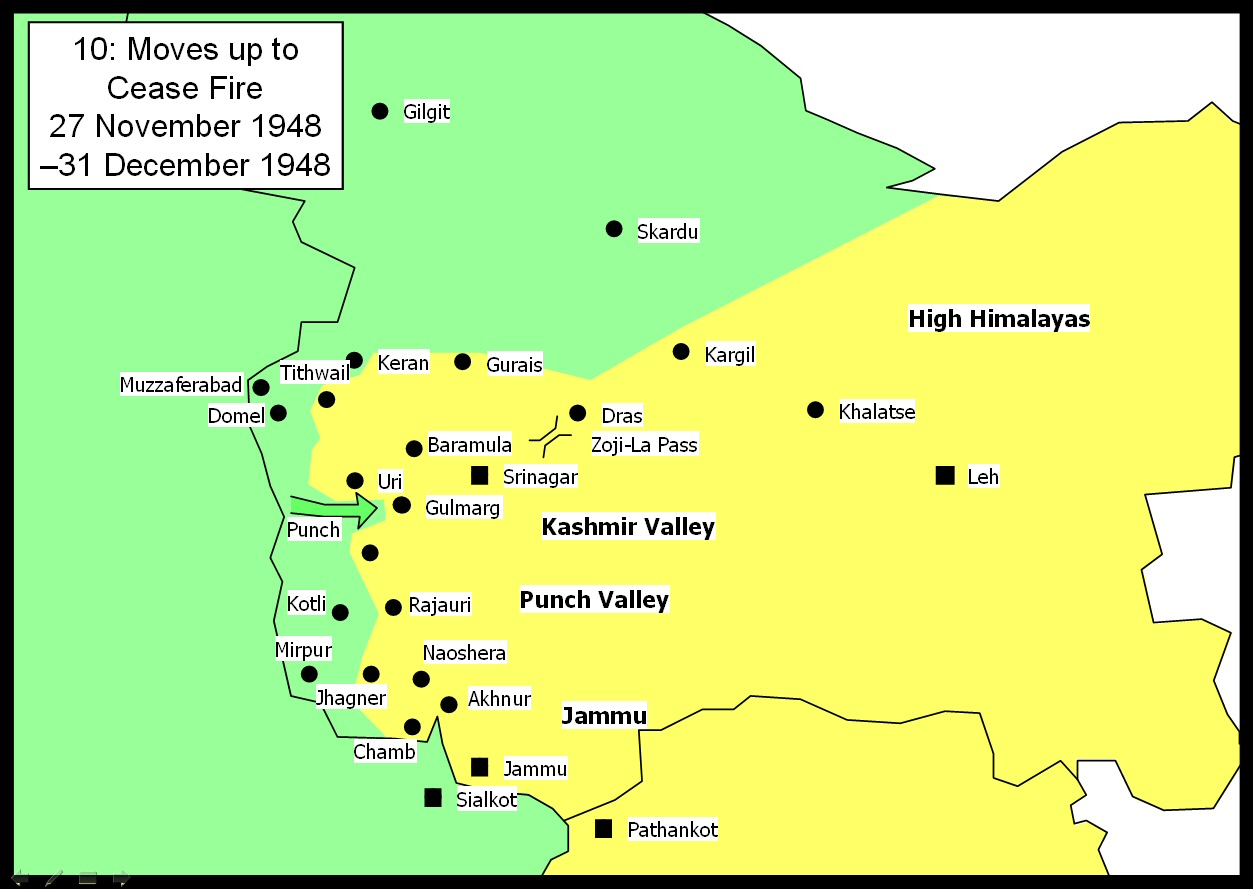
Cease-fire line between India and Pakistan after the 1947 conflict

India and Pakistan fought two further wars in 1965 and 1971. Following the latter war, the countries reached the Simla Agreement, agreeing on a Line of Control between their respective regions and committing to a peaceful resolution of the dispute through bilateral negotiations.

In 1986, the Anantnag riots broke out after the CM Gul Shah announced the construction of a mosque at the site of an ancient Hindu Temple in Jammu and made an incendiary speech. These statements are believed to have been partially to blame for the breaking out of riots. The 1987 Jammu and Kashmir Legislative Assembly election were widely perceived to have been rigged which lead to several disgruntled Kashmiri youth joined the Jammu and Kashmir Liberation Front (JKLF) as an alternative to the ineffective democratic setup that was prevalent. A Muslim United Front candidate, Mohammad Yousuf Shah, a victim of the rigging and state's mistreatment, took the name Syed Salahuddin and would become chief of the militant outfit Hizb-ul-Mujahideen. His aides the so-called 'HAJY group' – Abdul Hamid Shaikh, Ashfaq Majid Wani, Javed Ahmed Mir and Mohammed Yasin Malik joined the JKLF, this led to gain in the momentum of the popular insurgency in the Kashmir Valley. The year 1989 saw the intensification of conflict in Jammu and Kashmir as Mujahadeens from Afghanistan slowly infiltrated the region following the Soviet withdrawal from Afghanistan. Pakistan provided arms and training to both indigenous and foreign militants in Kashmir, thus adding fuel to the smoldering fire of discontent in the valley. Murder of Kashmiri Hindus, intellectuals, pro-Indian politicians and activists were described necessary to get rid of un-Islamic elements. In the early 1990s; 90,000–100,000 Kashmiri Hindu Pandits of an estimated population of 120,000–140,000 fled the Valley, owing to fear and panic set off by targeted killings of some members of the community—including high-profile officials and public calls for independence among the insurgents. The accompanying rumours and uncertainty together with the absence of guarantees for their safety by the state government might have been the latent causes of the exodus.

On 5 August 2019, the Government of India revoked the special status (limited autonomy) granted under Article 370 of the Indian Constitution to Jammu and Kashmir upon accession to India as a temporary measure. This was followed by cutting off of communication lines in the valley for 5 months, thousands of additional security forces were deployed to curb any uprising and the arrest and detaining of several leading Kashmiri politicians, including former chief ministers Mehbooba Mufti and Omar Abdullah, MLAs Mohammed Yousuf Tarigami and Engineer Rashid. Later, the state was bifurcated into two union territories of Jammu and Kashmir and Ladakh and replaced the bicameral legislature into a unicameral legislature.

== Punjab ==
=== Khalistan movement ===
The Khalistan movement aims to create a homeland for Sikhs by establishing a sovereign state, called Khālistān ('Land of the Khalsa'), in the Punjab region. The territorial definition of the proposed Khalistan consists of state of Punjab, India (including small parts of Haryana which were previously part of Punjab) and sometimes also includes Punjab, Pakistan.

Sikhs previously had a separate state in the 19th century (the Sikh Empire, led by Maharaja Ranjit Singh), which was invaded by the British. Calls for the recreation of a separate Sikh state began in the wake of the fall of the British Empire. In 1940, the first explicit call for Khalistan was made in a pamphlet titled "Khalistan". With financial and political support of the Sikh diaspora, the movement flourished in the Indian state of Punjab – which has a Sikh-majority population – continuing through the 1970s and 1980s, and reaching its zenith in the late 1980s.

In June 1984, the Indian Government ordered a military operation, Operation Blue Star to clear Harmandir Sahib, Amritsar of militant Sikhs led by Jarnail Singh Bhindranwale. The military action in the temple complex was criticized by Sikhs worldwide, who interpreted it as an assault on the Sikh religion. Five months after the operation, on 31 October 1984, Indira Gandhi was assassinated in an act of revenge by her two Sikh bodyguards, Satwant Singh and Beant Singh. Public outcry over Gandhi's death led to the killings of more than 3,000 Sikhs in Delhi alone in the ensuing 1984 anti-Sikh riots. In the 1990s, the insurgency petered out, and the movement failed to reach its objective due to multiple reasons including a heavy police crackdown on separatists, factional infighting, and disillusionment from the Sikh population.

=== Babbar Khalsa International (1978-present) ===
Babbar Khalsa International was formed in April 1978 to establish an independent Sikh nation called Khalistan. It seeks to establish the nation by violent attacks. It was highly active from 1980 to late 1990s, and carried out notable attacks including the bombing of Air India Flight 182, the 1985 Narita International Airport bombing, and the assassination of CM Beant Singh. In 1984, Babbar Khalsa claimed responsibility for the killing of 76 Nirankaris.

Though Babbar Khalsa is no longer as active, it continues to operates small scale attacks by the help of its active sleeper cells. In April 2025 in Punjab, police detained four Babbar Khalsa International terrorists who have been backed by ISI in order to execute explosive detonations in the liquor shops in Batala.

It has been designated as a terrorist organisation by the United States, Canada, the United Kingdom, the European Union, Japan, Malaysia, and India.

== Assam ==
Assam has been a refuge for militants for several years, due to its porous borders with Bangladesh and Bhutan and also due to its very close proximity to Burma. The main causes of the friction include anti-foreigner agitation in the 1980s and the simmering indigenous-migrant tensions. The insurgency in Assam is now largely contained, and major groups like ULFA have been disbanded. The government of Bangladesh has arrested and extradited senior leaders of the ULFA.

=== United Liberation Front of Asom (1979–present) ===
The United Liberation Front of Asom was formed in April 1979 to establish a sovereign state of Assam for the indigenous people of Assam through an armed struggle. The Government of India had banned the ULFA in 1990 and has officially labelled it as a terrorist group, whereas the US State Department lists it under "Other groups of concern". Military operations against it by the Indian Army that began in 1990 continue to the present. In the past two decades, some 10,000 people have died in the clash between the rebels and the government. The Assamese secessionist groups have protested against the illegal migration from the neighbouring regions. In the mid-20th century, people from present-day Bangladesh (then known as East Pakistan) migrated to Assam. In 1961, the Government of Assam passed legislation making use of Assamese language compulsory which had to be withdrawn later under pressure from Bengali speaking people of the Barak Valley. In the 1980s the Brahmaputra valley saw six years of Assam agitation triggered by the discovery of a sudden rise in registered voters on electoral rolls. In recent times the organisation has lost its middle rung leaders after most of them were arrested.

=== Muslim United Liberation Tigers of Assam (1996–present) ===
The Muslim United Liberation Tigers of Assam (MULTA), established in 1996, advocates a separate country for the Muslims of the region.

=== Karbi Separatism (1999–2021) ===
==== United People's Democratic Solidarity (1999–2014) ====
The United People's Democratic Solidarity (UPDS) demands Karbistan a sovereign nation for the Karbi people. It was formed in March 1999 with the merger of two militant outfits in Assam's Karbi Anglong district, the Karbi National Volunteers (KNV) and Karbi People's Front (KPF). The UPDS signed a cease-fire agreement for one year with the Indian Government on 23 May 2002. However, this led to a split in the UPDS with one faction deciding to continue with its subversive activities (the KLNCHLF) while the other commenced negotiations with the Government. As of 14 December 2014, The UPDS has formally disbanded following the mass surrender of all its cadres and leaders. Karbi separatists signed a peace deal with the Indian government on 5 September 2021.

==== Karbi Longri North Cachar Hills Liberation Front (2002–2021) ====
KLNLF emerged from the United People's Democratic Solidarity, being against the peace talks between the UDPS and the government. After the split, there have been turf wars between the two groups. In July 2008, the Assam government estimated that KLNLF had a membership of 225. KLNLF is closely linked to the United Liberation Front of Asom. 6 December is the foundation day of KLNLF. On 23 February 2021, KLNLF was disbanded. All its members surrendered to state government.

=== Kamtapur Liberation Organization (1995–present) ===
The Kamtapur Liberation Organisation (KLO) came into existence on 28 December 1995, with an objective to carve out a separate Kamtapur Nation. The proposed state is to comprise six districts in West Bengal and four contiguous districts of Assam which are Cooch Behar, Darjeeling, Jalpaiguri, North and South Dinajpur and Malda of West Bengal and four contiguous districts of Assam – Kokrajhar, Bongaigaon, Dhubri and Goalpara. Certain members of the All Kamtapur Students Union (AKSU) wanted to organise an armed struggle for a separate Kamtapur nation. For this purpose, they approached the United Liberation Front of Asom (ULFA). The KLO was formed to address problems of the Koch Rajbongshi people such as large-scale unemployment, land alienation, perceived neglect of Kamtapuri language, identity, and grievances of economic deprivation.

=== Bodoland ===
==== Bodo Liberation Tigers Force (1996–2003) ====
The Bodo Liberation Tigers Force fought for autonomy of Bodoland under Prem Singh Brahma. It surrendered with the establishment of Bodoland Territorial Council.

==== National Democratic Front of Bodoland (1986–2020) ====
The National Democratic Front of Bodoland (NDFB) was formed in 1986 as the Bodo Security Force, and aims to set up an independent nation of Bodoland. In January 2020, two Bodo separatist groups in Assam, the NDFB and the All Bodo Student's Union (ABSD), signed a peace accord with the Indian government in which they dissolved their organizations in exchange for political and economic demands and legal protections for Bodo language and culture.

=== Dimaraji (1990s–2009) ===
The United Liberation Front of Asom and National Socialist Council of Nagaland helped create the Dimasa National Security Force (DNSF) in the early 1990s. But most DNSF members surrendered in 1995. However Commander-in-Chief Jewel Gorlosa, refused to surrender and launched the Dima Halam Daogah (DHD) an extremist group that functioned in Assam and Nagaland and sought to create a Dimaland or Dimaraji for the Dimasa people. After the peace agreement between the DHD and the central government in the year 2003, the group further broke out and Dima Halam Daogah (Jewel) (DHD(J)) also known as Black Widow was born which was led by Jewel Gorlosa. The Black Widow's declared objective is to create Dimaraji nation for the Dimasa people in Dima Hasao only. However the objective of DHD (Nunisa faction) is to include parts of Cachar, Karbi Anglong, and Nagaon districts in Assam, and sections of Dimapur district in Nagaland. In 2009 the group surrendered en masse to the CRPF and local police, 193 cadres surrendering on 2009-09-12 and another 171 on the 13th.

== Nagaland ==
In the 1950s, the Naga National Council led a violent unsuccessful insurgency against the Government of India, demanding a separate country for the Naga people, known as Nagalim. The secessionist violence decreased considerably after the formation of the Naga-majority Nagaland state, and more Naga Army militants surrendered after the Shillong Accord of 1975. However, some Nagas operating under the various factions of the National Socialist Council of Nagaland, continue to demand a separate country.

2014 General Elections of India recorded a voter turnout of more than 87% in Nagaland, which was the highest in India.

== Mizoram ==
Mizoram's tensions were largely due to the simmering Assamese domination and the neglect of the Mizo people. Many Mizo organizations, like the Mizo Union, had long complained of discrimination at the hands of the Assam Government and demanded a separate state for the Mizos. Currently, the insurgency is due to autonomy demands by the Bru (also known as Reang) people.

=== Mizo National Front (1966–1986) ===
==== Background ====
Mizo organizations, including the Mizo Union, had long complained of disproportional treatment at the hands of the Assam Government. This included the poor handling of the Mautam famine and when the state government made Assamese the official language without any consideration for the Mizo language.

The Mizo National Famine Front, which was originally formed to help the people during the Mautam Famine was converted into Mizo National Front (MNF) on 22 October 1961. Unlike the Mizo Union which demanded a separate state for the Mizos within India, the MNF aimed at establishing a sovereign Christian nation for the Mizos.

==== Insurgency and reaction ====
The MNF formed a special armed wing called the Mizo National Army (MNA) consisting of eight battalions organized on the pattern of the Indian army. MNA consisted of around 2000 men, supported by another group called the Mizo National Volunteers (MNV), which comprised an equal number of irregulars. In the early 1960s, the MNF leaders including Pu Laldenga visited East Pakistan (now Bangladesh), where the Government of Pakistan offered them a supply of military hardware and training. Laldenga and his lieutenant Pu Lalnunmawia was arrested by Assam but then later released. The MNF members forcibly collected donations from the Mizo people, recruited volunteers and trained them with arms supplied by Pakistan. By the end of 1965, the MNF weapon cache consisted of the plastic explosives stolen from the Border Roads Organization, rifles and ammunition obtained from the 1st Battalion, Assam Rifles, crude bombs and Sten guns.

On 1 March 1966, the Mizo National Front (MNF) declared independence after launching coordinated attacks on government offices and security forces post in different parts of the Mizo district in Assam. The government retaliated by various airstrikes and ground operatives by recapturing all the places seized by the MNF by 25 March 1966.

===== Aizawl airstrikes =====
On the afternoon of 4 March 1966, the IAF jet fighters strafed the MNF targets in Aizawl using machine guns, allegedly causing few civilian casualties. The next day, a more extensive airstrike was carried out for about five hours. According to some Mizos, the planes used incendiary bombs, resulting in fires that destroyed several houses in the Dawrpui and Chhinga Veng areas. According to some other accounts, the houses were destroyed in the fires started by the prisoners released from the Aizawl jail by the insurgents. Apart from Aizawl, the neighbouring villages of Tualbung and Hnahlan were also bombarded. Most of the civilian population fled Aizawl and took refuge in the villages in the adjacent hills.

In the history of independent India, this remains the only instance of the Government of India resorting to airstrikes in its territory.

==== Post 1966 and end of the secessionist movement ====
After 1966, the MNF resorted to low-intensity attacks. The Mizo Union's negotiations with the Union Government resulted in the Mizo district gaining the status of a Union Territory as "Mizoram" on 21 January 1972. MNF's secessionist movement came to an end in 1986, when it signed the Mizo accord with the Government of India. The Government agreed to create a separate state for the Mizos. MNF, in return, decided to give up its secessionist demand and the use of violence. MNF is currently a political party.

=== Bru National Liberation Front ===
Currently, the insurgency status is classified as partially active, due to secessionist/autonomy/union territory demands made by the Chakmas for Chakmastan as a separate state and Reangs for Bruland as a separate state. The Chakma and Reang tribes complain of religious and ethnic persecution, and complain that the dominant Mizo ethnic group, almost entirely Christian, wants to convert them to Christianity. Following an ethnic riot with the Mizos in 1997, tens of thousands of Reangs are living as refugees in Tripura and Assam.

In 1997, the Bru National Union (BNU) (formed in 1994) passed a resolution in 1997 demanding an Autonomous District Council (ADC) in the western areas of Mizoram (via the 6th Schedule of the Constitution) which the Mizoram government and the Young Mizos Association rejected. Some Mizo organizations reacted by demanding that the Brus be left out of the State's electoral rolls as they "are not indigenous to Mizoram". Clashes between the two communities in Mamit district led to the creation of the Bru National Liberation Front (BNLF) in 1996. In October 1997, members of the BNLF kidnapped and murdered a Mizo forest guard in Dampa Tiger Reserve. In reactions to this, ethnic riots took place, between 35,000 and 40,000 Bru villagers were forced to flee Mizoram and seek shelter in camps in Tripura The BNU claimed that 1,391 Bru houses in 41 villages were burnt down and several people were raped and killed whereas the Mizoram police put the number of homes torched at 325 in 16 villages but did not confirm any rape or murder.

The outfit is involved in ransom mostly targeting non-Brus and Mizo Christians, which is a major source of finance for the terrorist group. Besides, the BNLF is also involved in violent attacks against security force personnel. The outfit was also engaged in internecine clashes with other terrorist outfits in the Northeast, like the National Liberation Front of Tripura (NLFT). In 2001, the BNLF and the government of Mizoram opened dialogue for the first time. By 2005, both parties arrived at an agreement that included the BNLF surrendering its arms and repatriation. However, in 2009, the deal fell through after Bru armed groups killed a Mizo youth.

Currently, there have been talks of reparation between the Central Government, Government of Mizoram, Government of Tripura and various Bru organizations. Reparation includes one-time assistance of ₹4 lakh as a fixed deposit within a month of repatriation, monthly cash assistance of ₹5,000 through DBT, free rations for two years, ₹1.5 lakh in three instalments as housebuilding assistance, certificates for Eklavya residential schools, permanent residential and ST certificates and also funds to the Mizoram government for improving security in the resettlement areas. However, attempts of repartitions have largely failed due to the demand of autonomous councils and the fear of being attacked. Many tribals protested against reparations in favour of permanent settlement in Tripura demanding that the Centre restore their food and cash benefits.

=== Hmar People's Convention-Democracy (1995 – present) ===
The Hmar People's Convention-Democracy (HPC-D) is an armed insurgency group formed in 1995 to create an independent Hmar State. It is the offspring of the Hmar People's Convention (HPC), which entered into an agreement with the Government of Mizoram in 1994 resulting in the formation of the Sinlung Hills Development Council (SHDC) in North Mizoram. Their recruited cadres are from the States where the Hmar people are spread – Assam, Manipur, Mizoram, Tripura and Meghalaya. The HPC(D) is demanding a separate administrative unit as a union territory under the Sixth Schedule of the Constitution of India.

== Manipur ==
The Kingdom of Manipur in Northeast India, bordering Burma, became a British protectorate at the end of the first Anglo-Burmese War. After an 1891 rebellion and the Anglo-Manipuri War, it was made a princely state of British Raj, and directly ruled by the British through officials who governed the territory under the nominal charge of the kings. During the 1947 decolonisation of the British Raj, the state acceded to the Indian Union on 11 August 1947. In October 1949, prior to the passage of the Indian Constitution, the state was asked to merge into the Indian Union and given the status of a union territory (then called a 'Part C State').

The controversial merger agreement through the coercion of the then princely ruler led to disaffection among some sections of the populace, eventually leading to the formation of a number of insurgent organizations. They sought the creation of an independent state within the territory of the former princely state, and dismissal of the merger agreement. After a protracted agitation, Manipur was granted statehood in January 1972. Despite its statehood, the insurgency continued. On 8 September 1980, Manipur was declared an area of disturbance, when the Indian government imposed the Armed Forces (Special Powers) Act on the region.

The parallel rise of Naga nationalism in neighboring Nagaland led to the emergence of the National Socialist Council of Nagaland (NSCN) activities in Manipur. Clashes between the Isak-Muivah (NSCN-IM) and Khaplang (NSCN-K) factions further aggravated tensions, as Kuki tribals began creating their own guerrilla groups in order to protect their interests from NSCN attacks. Skirmishes between the two ethnic groups took place during the 1990s. Other ethnic groups such as the Paite, Vaiphei, Pangals and Hmars followed suit establishing militant groups.

Unlike other conflicts in the Northeast, not many ‘surrenders’ have been reported from Manipur, indicating the tight control that the outfits have maintained over their cadres. The groups are armed with an extremely efficient intelligence network and superior fire power. The militants have been able to carve out a number of "liberated" zones across the State. However, by the end of 2007, the security forces had managed to dislodge the militants from most of these zones.

Manipur has witnessed a rise in insurgent activities ever since ethnic violence erupted in the state between the Kuki and the Meitei people on 3 May 2023. This marked a new era of insurgency in the state as it witnessed a resurgence of the membership of various militant groups in the region.

=== United National Liberation Front (1990–present) ===
The United National Liberation Front (UNLF) was founded on 24 November 1964 by Arambam Samarendra Singh to establish a sovereign and socialist Manipur It is one of the oldest insurgent groups in the Northeast. Until 1990 it was only a social organization but took up arms in the early 90s by establishing the Manipur People's Army (MPA). In 1990, a faction led by Namoijam Oken left UNLF and formed the UNLF (Oken group). This led to clashes between the two groups, which caused more than 100 deaths. Later, UNLF (Oken) group merged with splinter groups of the Kangleipak Communist Party (KCP) and the People's Revolutionary Party of Kangleipak (PREPAK) and formed the Kanglei Yawol Kanna Lup (KYKL). The front has also undertaken a social reformation campaign against rampant alcoholism, gambling, drug peddling and drug abuse. It has even helped in solving private and petty disputes and has claimed to have shot more than 50 rapists.

The UNLF has also clashed with NSCN (IM) because of NCSN's demand to include 4 districts of Manipur in creating a "Greater Nagaland" which the UNLF has strongly opposed.

=== People's United Liberation Front ===
The People's United Liberation Front (PULF) is an Islamist organization that was found in 1993. After communal clashes between the Meiteis and the Pangals in the 1993 Pangal massacre, many militant outfits such as the Northeast Minority Front (NEMF), Islamic National Front (INF), Islamic Revolutionary Front (IRF), United Islamic Liberation Army (UILA), Islamic Liberation Front (ILF) and the People's United Liberation Front (PULF) were formed. On 30 May 2007, the Islamic National Front (INF), merged with the PULF.

The PULF has received arms and raining from the NSCN (IM) in the Ukhrul district and also in Myanmar.

=== Kuki National Organization ===
The Kuki National Organization with its armed wing; the Kuki National Army seeks statehood for Kuki-dominated areas in Manipur within India or a territorial council within Manipur. It has also made claims in Myanmar. It is currently in a ceasefire with the Indian government.

=== Coordination Committee ===
In Manipur the following militant groups have come together as the CorCOM (short form of Coordination Committee).

- Kangleipak Communist Party (KCP),
- People's Liberation Army of Manipur (PLA),
- Kanglei Yawol Kanna Lup (KYKL),
- People's Revolutionary Party of Kangleipak (PREPAK)
- People's Revolutionary Party of Kangleipak-Pro (PREPAK-Pro),
- Revolutionary People's Front (RPF)
- United National Liberation Front (UNLF)
- United People's Party of Kangleipak (UPPK)

CorCom is on the extremist organizations list of the Government of India, and is responsible for many bombings usually during Indian holidays and elections.

== Arunachal Pradesh ==
Insurgency in Arunachal Pradesh had existed due to its close proximity to the Chinese and Burmese border and its diverse ethnic, tribal and religious population. Although currently there are no active local insurgent groups in the state, there are ethnic insecurities among people primarily due to a fear of loss of political dominance and socio-economic benefits.

=== National Liberation Council of Taniland ===
The National Liberation Council of Taniland (NLCT) was active along the Assam – Arunachal Pradesh border, and its members belong to the Tani groups of people and are demanding Taniland. The group enjoys weak support from the local population of Arunachal Pradesh. The group has also received support from the National Socialist Council of Nagaland-Isak-Muivah. The Tani groups are one of the ethnic groups of northeast India and are also known as known as Mising in Assam and Adi, Nyishi, Galo, Apatani, Tagin, in Arunachal Pradesh as well as the Lhoba in China.

== See also ==
- Territorial disputes of India
- Proposed states and union territories of India
- Autonomous administrative divisions of India
- Separatism in China
- Separatism in Russia
- Separatism in Spain
- Separatism in the United States
- Separatism in the United Kingdom
- Separatism in the Philippines
- Greater India

== Further reading and viewing ==
- List of terrorist groups active in the country – Ministry of Home Affairs
- Racine, Jean-Luc (2013). Secessionism in independent India: Failed attempts, irredentism, and accommodations. Secessionism and Separatism in Europe and Asia: To have a state of one's own. Routledge. pp. 147–163.
- YouTuber Soch by Mohak Mangal explaining the Nagaland insurgency: Nagaland's insurgency, explained ft. @But Why. Provides a brief explainer for the movement.
- A. Lanunungsang Ao; From Phizo to Muivah: The Naga National Question; New Delhi 2002
- Blisters on their feet: tales of internally displaced persons in India's North East; Los Angeles [u.a.] 2008; ISBN 978-81-7829-819-1
- Dutta, Anuradha; Assam in the Freedom Movement; Calcutta 1991
- Hazarika, Sanjoy; Strangers of the Mist: Tales of War and Peace from India's Northeast; New Delhi u.a. 1994
- Horam, M.; Naga insurgency: the last thirty years; New Delhi 1988
- International Work Group for Indigenous Affairs (Hrsg.); The Naga nation and its struggle against genocide; Kopenhagen 1986
- Nibedom, Nirmal; The Night of the Guerillas; Delhi 1978
- Srikanth, H.; Thomas, C. J.; Naga Resistance Movement and the Peace Process in Northeast India; in: Peace and Democracy in South Asia, Vol. I (2005)
- Terrorism and separatism in North-East India; Delhi 2004; ISBN 81-7835-261-3
- "The Other Burma: Conflict, counter-insurgency and human rights in Northeast India"
- Sinlung
- Insurgencies in Northeast India:Conflict, Co-option, and Change
- Journal of North East India Studies
- Naxalism and its Causes – Jagran Josh
- India's Naxalite Insurgency: History, Trajectory, and Implications for U.S.-India Security Cooperation on Domestic Counterinsurgency by Thomas F. Lynch III – Institute for National Strategic Studies.

== Sources ==
- Evans, Alexander (2002). "A departure from history: Kashmiri Pandits, 1990–2001". Contemporary South Asia. 11 (1): 19–37. doi:10.1080/0958493022000000341. ISSN 0958-4935. S2CID 145573161.
- Korbel, Josef (1953). "The Kashmir dispute after six years". International Organization. 7 (4). Cambridge University Press: 498–510. doi:10.1017/s0020818300007256. JSTOR 2704850. S2CID 155022750.
- Schofield, Victoria (2003) [First published in 2000]. Kashmir in Conflict. London and New York: I. B. Taurus & Co. ISBN 978-1860648984.
- Varshney, Ashutosh (1992). "Three Compromised Nationalisms: Why Kashmir has been a Problem" (PDF). In Raju G. C. Thomas (ed.). Perspectives on Kashmir: the roots of conflict in South Asia. Westview Press. pp. 191–234. ISBN 978-0-8133-8343-9.
