= Insurgency in Northeast India =

Ongoing militancy in Northeast India

- Map of India with northeastern states highlighted red
Date	1954–present (72 years)
Location	Northeast India (Arunachal Pradesh, Assam, Manipur, Nagaland, Tripura, Meghalaya and Mizoram), Bhutan, and Myanmar
Status	Ongoing as low-level insurgency; The insurgency in Mizoram ended in 1986 following the Mizoram Peace Accord; The insurgency in Tripura ended in 2024 following the 2024 Tripura Peace Accord

Belligerents
India; Indian Armed Forces; Central Reserve Police Force; Border Security Force; SULFA; Bhutan; Bangladesh; Myanmar	Separatist groups: UNLFW; NDFB (1986–2020); NSCN; ULFA (operating mostly in Myanmar); KLO (1964–2023); CorCom; UNLF (1964–2023); PLA–MP; KCP; PREPAK; Kanglei Yawol Kanna Lup; Maoist Communist Party of Manipur; ZRA (1997–2005); Tani Army; NLFT (1989–2024); ATTF (1990–2024); KLNLF (2004–21); BLTF (1996–2003); Other: Garo National Liberation Army (2009–18); Hynniewtrep National Liberation Council (2000–10); People's Democratic Council of Karbi Longri (2016–21); Adivasi Cobra Force (1996–2012); Mizo National Front (1954–86); Tripura National Volunteers (1978–88); Dima Halam Daogah (2009–13); United People's Democratic Solidarity (1999–2014); Jihadist groups: MULTA (1996–2016); AQIS (since 2016)

Commanders and leaders
(India) Droupadi Murmu; (India) Narendra Modi; (India) Amit Shah; (India) S. Jaishankar; Sujoy Lal Thaosen; N. S. Raja Subramani; Dhiraj Seth; Dinesh Kumar Tripathi; (India) Amar Preet Singh; Daljit Singh Chaudhary; Rajnath Singh; Rajesh Kumar Singh; (Bhutan) Jigme Khesar Namgyel Wangchuck; (Bhutan) Lotay Tshering; (Bangladesh) Mohammed Shahabuddin; (Myanmar) Myint Swe; (Myanmar) Min Aung Hlaing; Former: (India) Rajendra Prasad; (India) Sarvepalli Radhakrishnan; (India) Zakir Husain; (India) Mohammad Hidayatullah; (India) V. V. Giri; (India) Fakhruddin Ali Ahmed; (India) B. D. Jatti; (India) Neelam Sanjiva Reddy; (India) Zail Singh; (India) R. Venkataraman; (India) Shankar Dayal Sharma; (India) K. R. Narayanan; (India) A. P. J. Abdul Kalam; (India) Pratibha Patil; (India) Pranab Mukherjee; (India) Ram Nath Kovind; (India) Jawaharlal Nehru; (India) Gulzarilal Nanda; (India) Lal Bahadur Shastri; (India) Morarji Desai; (India) Charan Singh; (India) Indira Gandhi †; (India) Rajiv Gandhi †; (India) V. P. Singh; (India) Chandra Shekhar; (India) P. V. Narasimha Rao; (India) H. D. Deve Gowda; (India) Inder Kumar Gujral; (India) Atal Bihari Vajpayee; (India) Manmohan Singh; Kailash Nath Katju; Govind Ballabh Pant; Yashwantrao Chavan; Uma Shankar Dikshit; Kasu Brahmananda Reddy; Hirubhai M. Patel; Prakash Chandra Sethi; Shankarrao Chavan; Buta Singh; Mufti Mohammad Sayeed; Murli Manohar Joshi; Indrajit Gupta; L. K. Advani; Shivraj Patil; P. Chidambaram; Sushilkumar Shinde; M. C. Chagla; Dinesh Singh; Swaran Singh; Shyam Nandan Prasad Mishra; Bali Ram Bhagat; P. Shiv Shankar; N. D. Tiwari; Vidya Charan Shukla; Madhav Singh Solanki; Sikander Bakht; Jaswant Singh; Yashwant Sinha; Natwar Singh; S. M. Krishna; Salman Khurshid; Sushma Swaraj; V. G. Kanetkar; Imdad Ali; B. B. Mishra; N. S. Saxena; S. M. Ghosh; R. C. Gopal; P. R. Rajgopal; Birbal Nath; R. N. Sheopory; S. D. Chowdhury; Shival Swarup; J. F. Ribeiro; T. G. L. Iyer; S. D. Pandey; P. G. Harlarnkar; Kanwar Pal Singh Gill; S. Subramanian; D. P. N. Singh; S. V. M. Tripathi; M. B. Kaushal; M. N. Sabharwal; Trinath Mishra; S. C. Chaube; Jyoti Kumar Sinha; S. I. S. Ahmed; V. K. Joshi; A. S. Gill; Vikram Srivastava; K. Vijay Kumar; Pranay Sahay; Dilip Trivedi; Prakash Mishra; K. Durga Prasad; R. R. Bhatnagar; Anand Prakash Maheshwari; Kuldiep Singh; Bipin Rawat; Rajendrasinhji Jadeja; S. M. Shrinagesh; Kodandera Subayya Thimayya; Pran Nath Thapar; Jayanto Nath Chaudhuri; Paramasiva Prabhakar Kumaramangalam; Sam Manekshaw; Gopal Gurunath Bewoor; Tapishwar Narain Raina; Om Prakash Malhotra; K. V. Krishna Rao; Arun Shridhar Vaidya; Krishnaswamy Sundarji; Vishwa Nath Sharma; Sunith Francis Rodrigues; Bipin Chandra Joshi; Shankar Roychowdhury; Ved Prakash Malik; Sundararajan Padmanabhan; Nirmal Chander Vij; Joginder Jaswant Singh; Deepak Kapoor; V. K. Singh; Bikram Singh; Dalbir Singh Suhag; Bipin Rawat; Manoj Mukund Naravane; Mark Pizey; Stephen Hope Carlill; Ram Dass Katari; Bhaskar Sadashiv Soman; Adhar Kumar Chatterji; Sardarilal Mathradas Nanda; Sourendra Nath Kohli; Jal Cursetji; Ronald Lynsdale Pereira; Oscar Stanley Dawson; Radhakrishna Hariram Tahiliani; Jayant Ganpat Nadkarni; Laxminarayan Ramdas; Vijai Singh Shekhawat; Vishnu Bhagwat; Sushil Kumar; Madhvendra Singh; Arun Prakash; Sureesh Mehta; Nirmal Kumar Verma; Devendra Kumar Joshi; Robin K. Dhowan; Sunil Lanba; Karambir Singh; (India) Subroto Mukerjee; (India) Aspy Engineer; (India) Arjan Singh; (India) Pratap Chandra Lal; (India) Om Prakash Mehra; (India) Hrushikesh Moolgavkar; (India) Idris Hasan Latif; (India) Dilbagh Singh; (India) Lakshman Madhav Katre †; (India) Denis La Fontaine; (India) Surinder Mehra; (India) Nirmal Chandra Suri; (India) S. K. Kaul; (India) Satish Sareen; (India) Anil Yashwant Tipnis; (India) Srinivasapuram Krishnaswamy; (India) Shashindra Pal Tyagi; (India) Fali Homi Major; (India) Pradeep Vasant Naik; (India) Norman Anil Kumar Browne; (India) Arup Raha; (India) Birender Singh Dhanoa; (India) R. K. S. Bhadauria; Khusro Faramurz Rustamji; Ashwini Kumar; Sharawan Tandon; K. Rama Murti; Birbal Nath; M. C. Misra; H. P. Bhatnagar; T. Ananthachary; Prakash Singh; D. K. Arya; Arun Bhagat; A. K. Tandon; E. N. Rammohan; Gurbachan Singh Jagat; Ajay Raj Sharma; Ranjit Shekhar Mooshahary; A. K. Mitra; M. L. Kumawat; Raman Srivastava; U. K. Bansal; Subhash Joshi; D. K. Pathak; K. K. Sharma; Rajni Kant Mishra; V. K. Johri; Surjeet Singh Deswal; Rakesh Asthana; Pankaj Kumar Singh; Sujoy Lal Thaosen; Kailash Nath Katju; V. K. Krishna Menon; Yashwantrao Chavan; Swaran Singh; Jagjivan Ram; Bansi Lal; Chidambaram Subramaniam; Shankarrao Chavan; K. C. Pant; Sharad Pawar; Pramod Mahajan; Mulayam Singh Yadav; George Fernandes; Jaswant Singh; A. K. Antony; Arun Jaitley; Manohar Parrikar; Nirmala Sitharaman; M. K. Vellodi; O. Pulla Reddy; P. V. R. Rao; A. D. Pandit; V. Shankar; Harish Chandra Sarin; K. B. Lall; Govind Narain; D. R. Kohli; Gian Prakash; S. Banerjee; J. A. Dave; K. P. A. Menon; P. K. Kaul; S. M. Ghosh; S. K. Bhatnagar; T. N. Seshan; Naresh Chandra; Narinder Nath Vohra; K. A. Nambiar; T. K. Banerjee; Ajit Kumar; T. R. Prasad; Yogendra Narain; Subir Dutta; Ajay Prasad; Ajai Vikram Singh; Shekhar Dutt; Vijay Singh; Pradeep Kumar; Shashi Kant Sharma; R. K. Mathur; G. Mohan Kumar; Sanjay Mitra; Ajay Kumar; (Bhutan) Jigme Dorji Wangchuck; (Bhutan) Jigme Singye Wangchuck; (Bhutan) Jigme Palden Dorji; (Bhutan) Lhendup Dorji; (Bhutan) Jigme Thinley; (Bhutan) Sangay Ngedup; (Bhutan) Yeshey Zimba; (Bhutan) Khandu Wangchuk; (Bhutan) Kinzang Dorji; (Bhutan) Sonam Tobgye; (Bhutan) Tshering Tobgay; (Bhutan) Tshering Wangchuk; (Bangladesh) Sheikh Mujibur Rahman; (Bangladesh) Syed Nazrul Islam; (Bangladesh) Abu Sayeed Chowdhury; (Bangladesh) Mohammad Mohammadullah; (Bangladesh) Khondaker Mostaq Ahmad; (Bangladesh) Abu Sadat Mohammad Sayem; (Bangladesh) Ziaur Rahman; (Bangladesh) Abdus Sattar; (Bangladesh) A. F. M. Ahsanuddin Chowdhury; (Bangladesh) Hussain Muhammad Ershad; (Bangladesh) Shahabuddin Ahmed; (Bangladesh) Abdur Rahman Biswas; (Bangladesh) Badruddoza Chowdhury; (Bangladesh) Muhammad Jamiruddin Sircar; (Bangladesh) Iajuddin Ahmed; (Bangladesh) Zillur Rahman; (Bangladesh) Mohammad Abdul Hamid; (Bangladesh) Tajuddin Ahmad; (Bangladesh) Muhammad Mansur Ali; (Bangladesh) Mashiur Rahman; (Bangladesh) Shah Azizur Rahman; (Bangladesh) Ataur Rahman Khan; (Bangladesh) Mizanur Rahman Chowdhury; (Bangladesh) Moudud Ahmed; (Bangladesh) Kazi Zafar Ahmed; (Bangladesh) Muhammad Habibur Rahman; (Bangladesh) Khaleda Zia; (Bangladesh) Fazlul Haque; (Bangladesh) Fakhruddin Ahmed; (Bangladesh) Sheikh Hasina; (Myanmar) Ne Win; (Myanmar) San Yu; (Myanmar) Sein Lwin; (Myanmar) Maung Maung; (Myanmar) Saw Maung; (Myanmar) Than Shwe; (Myanmar) Sein Win; (Myanmar) Maung Maung Kha; (Myanmar) Tun Tin; (Myanmar) Saw Maung; (Myanmar) Than Shwe; (Myanmar) Khin Nyunt; (Myanmar) Soe Win; (Myanmar) Thein Sein; (Myanmar) Htin Kyaw; (Myanmar) Win Myint	G. Bidai (surrendered); Arabinda Rajkhowa (POW); Paresh Baruah; Anthony Doke; N. Bisheshwar Singh; Anup Chetia (POW); Kalalung Kamei; Arambam Somorendra †; Angami Zapu Phizo †; Laldenga #; I. K. Songbijit (surrendered); Biswamohan Debbarma (POW); Durga Minz (surrendered); Xabrias Khakha (surrendered); Prem Brahma (surrendered); Milton Burman (POW); Tom Adhikary (POW); Men Sing Takbi †; Pradip Terang (surrendered); Ranjit Debbarma (POW); Asim Umar †; Osama Mahmood

Strength
(India) 200,000 in Nagaland (1995) (Bangladesh) 70,000 (1992) (Bhutan) 8,634 (2008) (Myanmar) Unknown	Unknown

Casualties and losses
2000–2026: 1,186 killed	2000–2026: 6,189 killed 23,228 surrendered 25,886 captured
- 2000–2026: 4,452 civilians killed

The insurgency in Northeast India is an ongoing armed conflict in a number of India's northeastern states between the Indian government and several militant groups with various political ideologies, including separatism, communism, and Islamism.

Northeast India consists of eight states: the seven sister states of Assam, Meghalaya, Tripura, Arunachal Pradesh, Mizoram, Manipur, and Nagaland, and the brother state Sikkim included later. These states are connected to the rest of India by the Siliguri Corridor, a strip of land as narrow as 14.29 miles (23.00 km) wide. Tensions have existed between insurgents in the seven sister states and the central government as well as amongst their native indigenous people and migrants from other parts of India and illegal immigrants for many decades now.

Since the middle of 2010s, insurgency in the region has seen rapid decline, with a 80% reduction in violence and an 89% drop in civilian deaths in 2022 compared to 2014. Manipur has witnessed a rise in insurgent activities ever since ethnic violence broke out in the state on 3 May 2023 between the Meitei people and the Kuki people. This has led to a new era in Manipur's insurgency where militant groups witnessed a resurgence in membership.

In the 2014 Indian general election, Nagaland had the national high with 87.2% voter turnout. However most northeastern states had a higher voter turnout than national average except for Manipur, which had 60% voter turnout. Indian authorities claim that this shows the faith of the northeastern people in Indian democracy. In 2020, General Anil Chauhan, the then Chief of the Eastern Command (later, Chief of Defence Staff), stated that the area of violence in the entire North-East has shrunk primarily to an area which is the tri-junction between Assam, Arunachal Pradesh and north Nagaland.

On 27 April 2026, it was reported that the Government of India plans to eliminate insurgency in the region by 2029. The development follows the achievement of the 31 March 2026 deadline for Naxalite–Maoist insurgency with only one LWE-hit district (West Singhbhum). The Central Armed Police Forces (CAPF), along with the CoBRA battalions, is expected to be restructured and deployed to the region following 2026 West Bengal Legislative Assembly election (until 4 May) and Amarnath Yatra (until August) by mid 2026. Initially, the last Maoist Central Committee member, Misir Besra, would be tracked down in West Singhbhum and the state governments shall be formed following state assembly elections, followed by CAPF deployment for Amarnath Yatra and finally the North East. The North East deployment would commence with Manipur, followed by Assam, Arunachal Pradesh and Nagaland. The shift of force from the left-wing extremist region will be "calibrated". Manipur has already received the first batch of mine protected vehicles. Further, the Home Ministry has also tasked the Narcotics Control Bureau to plan a "systemic crackdown" on narcotics trade in the region which is being used to fund the insurgents.

== Reasons ==
Historically, the treatment of the Northeast as separate from the rest of India during the colonial era has continued to negatively affect its integration into the Republic of India. Present-day Northeast India started to be annexed into British India in the early 19th century to defend the eastern frontier from the incursions of the Burmese Empire, with Assam becoming part of the Bengal Presidency until 1874. Myanmar was part of British India for several decades; the dynamics of British rule in the region, which was the first time that a pan-Indian unit had fully conquered the Northeastern South Asian space, and Myanmar's 1937 separation from Indian administration, still affect their border regions today. Since 2014, the Union government has pursued the Act East Policy and a series of peace accords, and the Home Ministry reported an 80% fall in insurgency incidents. Critics cite Citizenship Amendment Act of 2019, and ethnic violence in Manipur since 2023.

Seven Sister states of Northeast India

=== Ethnic diversity ===
North-East India is India's most ethnically diversified area. Around 40 million people live there, including 213 of India's 635 tribal groups. These tribes each have their own distinct culture, each tribal group disagrees with being combined into mainstream India because it means losing their unique identity, giving rise to insurgency.

=== Lack of representation ===
The long distance between mainland India and the northeast, as well as a lack of representation for the region in the Indian Parliament, has contributed to the northeast being more neglected in the political framework of the country, which has served as a major reason behind the insurgencies occurring in the region.

=== East Bengali refugees ===
During the Bangladesh Liberation War, an estimated 10 million people from East Pakistan (present-day Bangladesh) fled the country and took refuge in India, particularly in the Indian states of West Bengal and the Indian northeast, especially Tripura and Assam. This changed the demography of the area, resulting in greater competition between locals and refugees, which further contributed to the insurgency in the area.

=== Underdevelopment ===
The northeast has been traditionally neglected economically in India, with the region receiving low levels of investment from both the Indian government and other investors.

=== Partitioned against will ===
The partitioning of the Northeast by the British during colonial rule resulted in arbitrary divisions that continue to affect the region today. One significant outcome was the separation of Chittagong from the Northeast, altering geographical and cultural connections. Similarly, the division of the Kachin-Chin region and Eastern Nagalim further fragmented communities that had historical ties. Additionally, the intervention of leaders like Nehru and organizations like the UN in the region's affairs exacerbated tensions and deepened divisions. These actions not only disrupted the natural cohesion of the region but also sowed seeds of discontent that persist to this day.

== Mizoram (1966–1986) ==
=== Mizo uprising (1966) ===
The Mizo National Front uprising was a revolt against the government of India aimed at establishing a sovereign nation state for the Mizo people, which started on 28 February 1966.

=== MNF insurgency (1966–1986) ===
Mizoram's tensions were largely due to the simmering Assamese domination and the neglect of the Mizo people. In 1986, the Mizo accord ended the main secessionist movement led by the Mizo National Front, bringing peace to the region. Insurgency status is classified as partially active, due to secessionist/autonomy demands by the Buddhist Chakmas for Chakmasthan and BRU (Reang) tribe of Tripuri kinship demanding Bru ADC . The Chakma and Reang tribes complain of religious and ethnic persecution, and complain that the dominant Mizo ethnic group, almost entirely Christian, wants to convert them to Christianity.

== Manipur ==
Manipur, which had been a princely state under the British Raj, acceded to India on 11 August 1947 and merged into the Indian Union on 15 October 1949, shortly before India became a Republic under its national constitution. The Maharaja of Manipur was given a privy purse and allowed to retain his cultural and religious functions. Manipur was pegged as a Part 'C' State, later renamed a union territory. In 1963, when neighbouring Nagaland was granted statehood, the Manipuris felt short-changed and started agitating for full statehood.

Despite the fact that Manipur became a separate state of the Indian Union on 21 January 1972, the insurgency continued. On 8 September 1980, Manipur was declared an area of disturbance, when the Indian government imposed the Armed Forces (Special Powers) Act, 1958 on the region; the act currently remains in force.

The parallel rise of Naga nationalism in neighbouring Nagaland led to the emergence of the National Socialist Council of Nagaland (NSCN) activities in Manipur. Clashes between the Isak-Muivah and Khaplang factions of the NSCN further aggravated tensions, as Kuki tribal began creating their own guerrilla groups in order to protect their interests from alleged Naga violations. Skirmishes between the two ethnic groups took place during the 1990s. Other ethnic groups such as the Paite, Vaiphei, Pangals and Hmars followed suit establishing militant groups.

Manipur has witnessed ethnic violence between the Kuki and the Meitei communities since 3 May 2023 which killed more than 120 people and injured more than 3000 people and led to a rise in militant activities in the region.

=== UNLF (1964–present) ===
The first separatist faction known as the United National Liberation Front (UNLF) was founded on 24 November 1964.

=== Marxist & Maoist groups (1977–present) ===
Between 1977 and 1980, the People's Liberation Army of Manipur (PLA), the People's Revolutionary Party of Kangleipak (PREPAK), the Kangleipak Communist Party (KCP) and the Kanglei Yawol Kanna Lup (KYKL) were formed, immediately joining the war.

== Nagaland ==
Nagaland was created in 1963 as the 16th state of the Indian Union, before which it was a district of Assam. Active Naga-Kuki insurgent groups mainly demand full independence. The Naga National Council led by Phizo was the first group to dissent in 1947 and in 1956 they went underground.

=== NSCN insurgency (1980–present) ===
The National Socialist Council of Nagaland was formed in 1980 to establish a Greater Nagaland, encompassing parts of Manipur, Nagaland, and the north Cachar hills (Assam). The NSCN split in 1988 to form two groups, NSCN(IM) and NSCN(K). As of 2015, both groups have observed a ceasefire truce with the Indian government.

The National Socialist Council of Nagaland—Khaplang is the second faction with the same aim of a Greater Nagaland and was formed in 1988.

== Tripura (1978–2024) ==
The first organised armed outfit to form was Tripura National Volunteers (TNV), was formed in 1978 and was active till 1988. Migration from East Bengal later, East Pakistan and Bangladesh after 1947 and in 1971 reduced the tribal share of the population from just over half in 1901 to about 37% in 1951 and about 29% in 1971, and tribal organisations such as Tripura Upajati Juba Samiti (founded 1967) demanded land protection and recognition of Kokborok. After riots in June 1980 in which hundreds of Bengali settlers were killed, the Army was deployed. The TNV signed an accord in 1988; the NLFT and ATTF continued the insurgency until accords in 2019 and 2024. AFSPA was withdrawn from the state in 2015.

The National Liberation Front of Tripura was formed in March 1989 by Dhananjoy Reang. During the period 1992 to 2001, a total of 764 civilians and 184 members of the security forces were killed in NLFT attacks. It was the most powerful organisation in Tripura with estimated strength of 1,500 to 2,000 cadres at its peak time. In 2019, it signed the Tripura Peace Accord to end the insurgency.

The All Tripura Tiger Force was formed by local aboriginal tribes in 1990, who were gradually outnumbered both directly and indirectly, even at the cost of being threatened for their survival economically and culturally, not to speak of their being reduced to minority population-wise; their sole aim is the expulsion of all Bangladeshi infiltration nearby Bangladesh.

The 2024 Tripura Peace Accord was signed between the insurgent groups NLFT, ATTF and the Government of India, Government of Tripura ending the 35 year insurgency in Tripura. The last remaining 328 militants of both groups surrendered to the Government forces as a part of the agreement and the Government of India announced a financial package of ₹250 crore for the rehabilitation of the surrendered cadres to the mainstream society.

== Assam ==
Assam has been a refuge for militants for a number of years, due to its porous borders with Bangladesh and Bhutan and also due to its very close proximity to Burma. The main causes of the friction include anti-foreigner agitation in the 1980s, and the simmering indigenous-migrant tensions. The government of Bangladesh has arrested and extradited senior leaders of the ULFA.

=== Bodoland ===
- BLTF (1996–2003): The Bodo Liberation Tigers Force fought for autonomy of Bodoland under Prem Singh Brahma. It surrendered with the establishment of Bodoland Territorial Council.
- NDFB (1986–2020): The National Democratic Front of Bodoland (NDFB) was formed in 1986 as the Bodo Security Force, and aims to set up an independent nation of Bodoland.

=== ULFA (1990–present) ===
The United Liberation Front of Assam was formed in April 1979 to establish a sovereign state of Assam for the indigenous people of Assam through an armed struggle. In recent times the organisation has lost its middle rung leaders after most of them were arrested.

=== KLO (1995–present) ===
The objective of the Kamtapur Liberation Organisation (KLO) is to carve out a separate Kamtapur Nation. The proposed state is to comprise six districts in West Bengal and four contiguous districts of Assam which are Cooch Behar, Darjeeling, Jalpaiguri, North and South Dinajpur and Malda of West Bengal and four contiguous districts of Assam – Kokrajhar, Bongaigaon, Dhubri and Goalpara. The KLO, in the beginning, was an unconcealed organisation, which was formed to address problems of the Koch Rajbongshi people, such as large-scale unemployment, land alienation, perceived neglect of Kamtapuri language, identity, and grievances of economic deprivation.

== Meghalaya ==
The state of Meghalaya was separated from the state of Assam in 1971, in order to satisfy the Khasi, Synteng and Garo for a separate state. The decision was initially praised as an example of successful national integration into the wider Indian state.

This, however, failed to prevent the rise of national consciousness among the local tribal populations, later leading to a direct confrontation between Indian nationalism and the newly created Garo and Khasi nationalisms. A parallel rise of nationalism in the other members of the Seven Sister States further complicated the situation, resulting in occasional clashes between rebel groups.

The state wealth distribution system further fueled the rising separatist movements, as funding is practised through per-capita transfers, which largely benefits the leading ethnic group.

The first militant outfit to emerge in the region was the Hynniewtrep Achik Liberation Council (HALC). It was formed in 1992, aiming to protect the interests of Meghalaya's indigenous population from the rise of non-tribal ("Dkhar") immigration.

A conflict of interest soon led to a split of the HALC. The Garo members formed the Achik Matgrik Liberation Army (AMLA) while the joint Jaintia-Khasi alliance of Hynniewtrep National Liberation Council (HNLC) was formed in 1993. The HNLC claims to represent the Khasi – Jaintia people, and its aim is to free Meghalaya from the alleged domination of the Garos and the outsiders (the "Dkhars").

The AMLA passed into obscurity, while the Achik National Volunteers Council (ANVC) took its place. The Garo-Khasi drift persisted as the HNLC had set up the goal of turning Meghalaya into an exclusively Khasi region; the ANVC, on the other hand, sought the creation of an independent state in the Garo Hills.

A number of non-Meghalayan separatist groups have also operated in the region, including the United Liberation Front of Assam and the National Democratic Front of Bodoland among others.

=== GNLA insurgency (2010–present) ===
The most active outfit in the state is the Garo National Liberation Army (GNLA), which was formed in 2009.

== Other insurgent groups ==
=== In Assam ===
- UPDS (2004–2014): The United People's Democratic Solidarity was formed in March 1999 with the merger of two groups in Assam's Karbi Anglong district, the Karbi National Volunteers (KNV) and the Karbi People's Front (KPF). In 2004, the UPDS (Anti-Talks) renamed itself as the Karbi Longri North Cachar Hills Liberation Front (KLNLF), and its armed wing as the Karbi Longri North Cachar Hills Resistance Force (KNPR). In December 2014, the UPDS disbanded, following the mass surrender of all it cadres and leaders.
- KLNLF (2004–2021): The Karbi Longri N.C. Hills Liberation Front is a militant group operating in the Karbi Anglong and Dima Hasao districts of Assam that was formed on 16 May 2004. The outfit claims to fight for the cause of Karbi tribes, and its declared objective is Hemprek Kangthim, meaning self-rule/self-determination of the Karbi people. It is closely linked with the ULFA (United Liberation Front of Assam)
- DHD (1995–2009): The Dima Halam Daoga (DHD) is a descendant of the Dimasa National Security Force (DNSF), which ceased operations in 1995. Commander-in-Chief Jewel Gorlosa, refused to surrender and launched the Dima Halam Daogah. After the peace agreement between the DHD and the central government in the year 2003, the group further broke out and DHD(J) also known as Black Widow was born which was led by Jewel Gorlosa. The Black Widow's declared objective is to create Dimaraji nation for the Dimasa people in Dima Hasao only. However the objective of DHD (Nunisa faction) is to include parts of Cachar, Karbi Anglong, and Nagaon districts in Assam, and sections of Dimapur district in Nagaland. In 2009 the group surrendered en masse to the CRPF and local police, 193 cadres surrendering on 2009-09-12 and another 171 on the 13th.
- MULTA (1996–2016): The objective of the Muslim United Liberation Tigers of Assam (MULTA) is to establish an Islamic state in India under sharia law. The group composed of migrants and indigenous peoples who practiced Islam. In 2016, it merged into the AQIS.

=== Zomi ===
Zomi is an umbrella term encompassing nine tribes in the state of Manipur. In 1993, the Zomi Re-unification Organisation (ZRO) and its armed wing, the Zomi Revolutionary Army (ZRA), were established in 1997 with the aim of safeguarding and protecting the interests of the Zomi people. Presently, the ZRA is engaged in a Suspension of Operation (SoO) with the Indian government, seeking a political resolution for the Zo community, which has long suffered neglect and suppression at the hands of the dominant tribe in Manipur.

=== Hmar ===
The Hmar People's Convention-Democracy (HPC-D) is an armed insurgency group formed in 1995 to create an independent Hmar State in North East India. It is the offspring of the Hmar People's Convention (HPC), which entered into an agreement with the Government of Mizoram in 1994 resulting in the formation of the Sinlung Hills Development Council (SHDC) in North Mizoram. Their recruited cadres are from the States where the Hmar people are spread – Assam, Manipur, Mizoram, Tripura and Meghalaya. The HPC(D) is demanding a separate administrative unit under the Sixth Schedule of the Constitution of India.

=== Taniland ===
The National Socialist Council of Taniland (NSCT) formerly the National Liberation Council of Taniland, is active along the Assam – Arunachal Pradesh border, and its members belong to the Tani groups of people which are demanding Taniland. The group enjoys no support from the local population of Arunachal Pradesh who are fiercely pro-India and the group is all but defunct now. The Tani groups are one of the ethnic groups of northeast India (variously known as Mising in Assam and Adi, Nyishi, Galo, Apatani, Tagin, in Arunachal Pradesh) in India as well as the Lhoba in China who live along the frontier of India.

== Spillover in Bhutan ==
Following the 1990 Operations Rhino and Bajrang, Assamese separatist groups relocated their camps to Bhutan. In 1996 the Bhutan government became aware of a large number of camps on its southern border with India. The camps were set up by four Assamese separatist movements: the ULFA, NDFB, Bodo Liberation Tigers Force (BLTF) and Kamtapur Liberation Organization (KLO). The camps also harboured separatists belonging to the National Socialist Council of Nagaland (NSCN) and the All Tripura Tiger Force (ATTF).

India then exerted diplomatic pressure on Bhutan, offering support in removing the rebel organisations from its soil. The government of Bhutan initially pursued a peaceful solution, opening dialogue with the militant groups on 1998. Five rounds of talks were held with ULFA, three rounds with DNFB, with KLO ignoring all invitations sent by the government. In June 2001 ULFA agreed to close down four of its camps; however, the Bhutanese government soon realized that the camps had simply been relocated.

By 2003 the talks had failed to produce any significant result. On 14 July 2003, military intervention was approved by the National Assembly. On 13 December 2003, the Bhutanese government issued a two-day ultimatum to the rebels. On 15 December 2003, after the ultimatum had expired, Operation All Clear – the first operation ever conducted by the Royal Bhutan Army – was launched.

By 3 January 2004, the Royal Bhutan Army had killed about 120 militants. They managed to capture several senior ULFA commanders. Large numbers of rebels fled to Bangladesh and India. Militants also were dislodged from all 30 camps and 35 observation posts, with the camps burned and razed to the ground.

Between 2008 and 2011, Royal Bhutan Police and Royal Bhutan Army personnel undertook numerous actions against alleged north Indian militants. Several firefights occurred while Bhutan military personnel were required to dispose of several explosive devices and destroyed a number of guerrilla camps.

== Spillover in Myanmar ==
The Indo-Burmese border was drawn over the homeland of many ethnic groups, such as the Mizos/Chins and the Nagas, with communities with strong ethnic ties living on both sides of the border. Several separatist groups have operated out of Myanmar, crossing into India via the porous border.

India-Myanmar military cooperation dates back to the 1960s when the Tatmadaw intercepted Naga and Mizo rebels heading to China for training. Indian support for the pro-democracy movement in the 1980s had caused the Tatmadaw to stop their operations against the northeastern rebel groups.

After the 2015 Manipur ambush, India conducted surgical strikes against NSCN-K camps inside Myanmar, and leaving 38 Naga insurgents dead and seven others injured.

In February and June 2019, Indian army and the Burmese Tatmadaw carried out joint operations Sunrise and Sunrise II, targeting in coordination several militant groups along the Indo-Burma border including the Kamtapur Liberation Organisation (KLO), the NSCN-K, the United Liberation Front of Assam (I) and the National Democratic Front of Boroland (NDFB). In February, Burmese troops stormed the NSCN-K headquarters at Taga in Hkamti Township. The Indian army reciprocated by starting a major operation against the Arakan Army in south Mizoram.

== Alliances ==
=== CorCom ===
In Manipur the following militant groups have come together as the CorCOM which is a short name for Coordination Committee.

- Kangleipak Communist Party (KCP),
- People's Liberation Army of Manipur (PLA),
- Kanglei Yawol Kanna Lup (KYKL),
- People's Revolutionary Party of Kangleipak (PREPAK), People's Revolutionary Party of Kangleipak-Pro (PREPAK-Pro),
- Revolutionary People's Front (RPF)
- United National Liberation Front (UNLF)
- United People's Party of Kangleipak (UPPK)

CorCom is on the extremist organisations list of the Government of India, and is responsible for many bombings usually associated with Indian holidays and elections.

=== Federal Government of Wesea ===
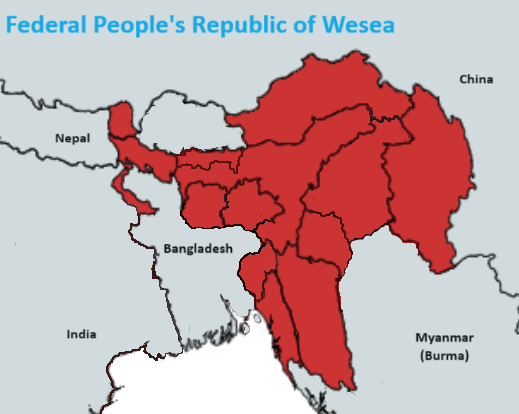
Map claimed by the FGW umbrella.

Some of the aforementioned militant groups have formed an alliance to fight against the governments of India, Bhutan, and Myanmar. They use the term "Western Southeast Asia" (WESEA) to describe the region in which they operate: Northeast India, Bhutan, North Bengal, and Myanmar. These groups include:

- The Kangleipak Communist Party (KCP)
- People's Liberation Army Of Manipur (PLA)
- Kanglei Yawol Kanna Lup (KYKL)
- People's Revolutionary Party of Kangleipak (PREPAK)
- People's Revolutionary Party of Kangleipak-Pro (PREPAK-Pro)
- Revolutionary People's Front
- United National Liberation Front of Manipur (UNLF)
- Hynniewtrep National Liberation Council of Meghalaya
- Kamtapur Liberation Organization, which operates in Assam and North Bengal
- United Liberation Front of Asom (ULFA)
- National Liberation Front of Tripura (NLFT) of Tripura

Additionally, other groups such as the Kachin Independence Army, Chin National Army, and Naga insurgent groups in Myanmar, as well as organizations like the Hmar People's Convention-Democratic, Gorkha Liberation Army, allies against Sikkim's annexation, Kuki Army, Tani National Liberation Council, Tripura Liberation Front, Garo National Liberation Army (GNLA), National Democratic Front of Boroland (NDFB), and Dimasa National Liberation Army (DNLA) are also part of this alliance.

In early 2024, some of these groups have taken advantage of the situation in Myanmar and declared independence, further escalating tensions in the region.

=== United National Liberation Front of WESEA ===
Nine militant groups of the northeast, including the NSCN (Khaplang) and the ULFA faction led by Paresh Baruah, have come together to form a new unified front known as UNLFW during a meeting held in Myanmar in early 2015. Besides the NSCN (K) and ULFA-Independent, other groups that participated in the meeting held at Taga in Sagaing division of Myanmar earlier this month were the Kangleipak Communist Party (KCP), Kanglei Yawol Kunna Lup (KYKL), the People's Revolutionary Party of Kangleipak (PREPAK), the People's Liberation Army (PLA), the United National Liberation Front (UNLF) and the National Democratic Front of Bodoland (Songbijit faction) (NDFB).

== Western Southeast Asia ==
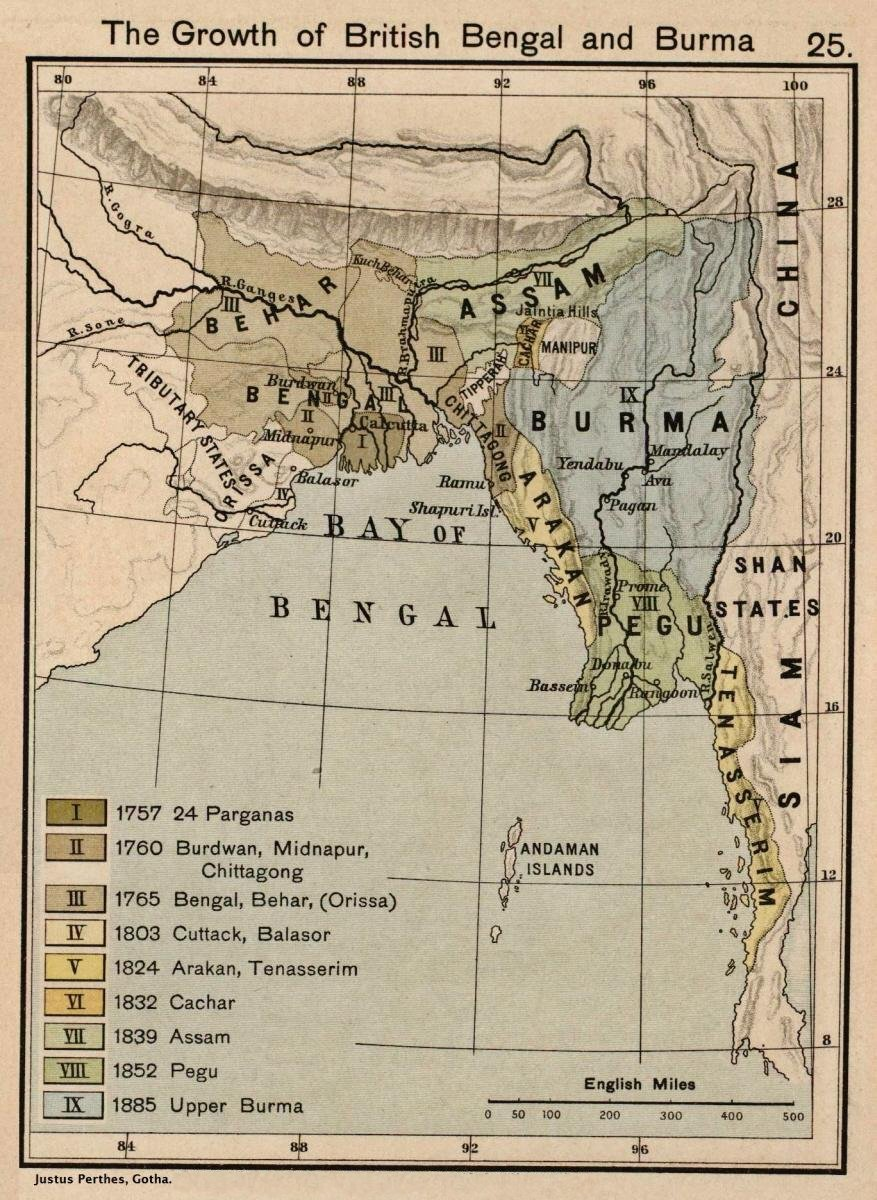
Eastern expansion of British India. Insurgents rejects the imposition of postcolonial Indian state boundaries.

The concept of "Western Southeast Asia" as used by Northeast Indian separatists gained prominence in the early 2010s. Insurgents rejected the label Northeast India and instead cast the region as the westernmost frontier of Southeast Asia. The Coordination Committee (CorCom), an umbrella organization of Meitei insurgent groups in Manipur established in 2011, played a key role in promoting the Western South East Asia (WESEA) terminology. On its third foundation day in 2014, CorCom announced the creation of a Joint Fighting Force to intensify armed activities, framing the move as part of a wider revolutionary effort across the region. The statement had stressed that Manipur's colonial experience was shared with other peoples of WESEA, citing commonalities in geography, ethnicity, and culture. CorCom argued that collective liberation could only be achieved through cooperation with other like-minded groups. Whilst the UNLFW's creation required the culmination of years of discussions, with the concept of a united front first explored in 2011 during meetings between ULFA, NSCN-K, and Manipuri groups, but only realized in 2015 after prolonged negotiations over leadership and organizational structure. UNLFW was the first to explicitly frame the alliance in terms of Western Southeast Asia. The coalition took political steps like forming a government-in-exile for WESEA to seek international support and recognition, Though this remained aspirational.

By 2014, the Manipur-based United National Liberation Front (UNLF) had explicitly adopted the term Western Southeast Asia (WESEA) in its rhetoric, describing the peoples of Northeast India as "exploited and subjugated." In one statement, the group condemned a Bangladeshi court verdict against United Liberation Front of Asom (ULFA) leader Paresh Baruah, framing the decision as an injustice against what it termed the "people of WESEA" engaged in a liberation struggle against Indian rule. The pan-regional concept of Western South East Asia (WESEA) reached its peak with the creation of the United National Liberation Front of Western South East Asia (UNLFWSEA) in April 2015. On 17 April, senior leaders of multiple insurgent groups met in Myanmar's Sagaing Division and agreed to form a unified front advocating independence for Northeast India and adjoining areas in Myanmar. A press release formally announced the coalition, explicitly adopting the WESEA label. The founding members included the Paresh Baruah-led United Liberation Front of Asom (ULFA-Independent), the National Socialist Council of Nagaland (NSCN-Khaplang), the National Democratic Front of Bodoland (NDFB-Songbijit), and the Kamtapur Liberation Organisation (KLO), representing insurgencies in Assam, Nagaland/Myanmar, Bodo territories, and North Bengal. Manipur-based groups such as the United National Liberation Front (UNLF) and the People's Liberation Army of Manipur (PLA-M) were also present at the founding meetings and expressed support, although they did not formally join due to internal leadership divisions.

Since its adoption, the term WESEA has become central to the rhetoric of several separatist groups in Northeast India. It functions as a collective label for identity, with insurgent manifestos and press releases frequently describing WESEA as a "colonized entity" under Indian control. A 2019 joint statement by Manipur's CorCom and ULFA-Independent, for instance, referred to the "colonial occupation by India of all the indigenous peoples of the WESEA Region" and called for unity in opposition to New Delhi. Such statements frame the insurgency as a continuation of decolonization, arguing that when British authority ended in 1947, the region was technically free but was subsequently incorporated into India through "force and coercion". This interpretation positions the insurgency as an effort to complete what they regard as an "unfinished process of liberation in Western Southeast Asia." Boycotts of Indian national holidays have become a recurring platform for separatist groups to invoke a WESEA identity. Insurgent organizations regularly issue joint calls for shutdowns on India's Independence Day (15 August) and Republic Day (26 January), framing these observances as reminders of perceived colonial occupation. For example, prior to Independence Day 2025, the ULFA-Independent and the NSCN (Yung Aung faction) released a joint statement urging strikes "across the region they call WESEA," referring to areas of Assam, Arunachal Pradesh, Manipur, and Nagaland. In their declaration, India's Independence Day was described as "meaningless for the people of WESEA", instead characterized as repression by Indian security forces. Similar coordinated boycott calls have appeared almost annually.

Outside of separatist circles, the usage of "Western Southeast Asia" as a regional unit is not recognized. Key themes in WESEA-related pronouncements consistently revolve around separatist narratives. Insurgent statements accuse Indian authorities for being a colonial power and doing that of resource exploitation, the enforcement of repressive laws such as the Armed Forces (Special Powers) Act (AFSPA), and the use of coercive measures against indigenous communities. Separatist rhetoric often alleges that India is undermining WESEA's identity through demographic change and cultural assimilation, citing issues such as Hindi-language promotion or citizenship legislation as threats to indigenous cultures. For example, a 2019 CorCom–ULFA statement warned that "non-indigenous populations [are] swarming all over WESEA" and framed such policies as intended to erode local identities. Immigration from Bangladesh also has been a concern for indigenous populations in Northeast India, which oppose significant demographic change. This immigration has led to historical movements such as the Assam Movement of the 1980s. In the early 21st century, some people in Assam and other states were deported to Bangladesh on suspicion of having illegally immigrated from Bangladesh (see also: National Register of Citizens for Assam). Insurgent leaders attempt to remove state or tribal boundaries and encourage a collective front by invoking a so called WESEA identity. CorCom has described its mission as a "unified freedom struggle throughout WESEA," while the UNLF in 2014 explicitly recalled the assistance provided by people of "WESEA (especially those of Assam, Meghalaya and Tripura)" to Bangladeshi refugees in 1971 from the Liberation War in a reference to a court verdict against ULFA(I)'s Paresh Barua.

== See also ==
- Timeline of insurgency in Northeast India
- Illegal Migrants (Determination by Tribunals) Act, 1983
- Separatist movements of India
- Insurgency in Jammu and Kashmir
- Naxalite–Maoist insurgency
- Terrorism in India
- Internal conflict in Myanmar
- Human rights in India
- List of organisations banned by the Government of India
- Insurgency in Manipur
- Insurgency in Arunachal Pradesh
