= Insurgency in Manipur =

Ongoing armed conflict between India and multiple separatist rebel groups

- Part of Insurgency in Northeast India
- Map of Manipur
Date	8 September 1980 – Present (46 years, 1 month, 2 weeks and 4 days)
Location	Manipur
Status	Ongoing

Belligerents
India; Myanmar	Insurgent groups; NSCN-IM; MPLF; KCP; MCPM; KYKL; PLA–MP; PREPAK; UNLF

Commanders and leaders
(India) Droupadi Murmu; (India) Narendra Modi; (India) Amit Shah; (India) S. Jaishankar; (India) Ajay Kumar Bhalla; (India) Y. Khemchand Singh; Sujoy Lal Thaosen; N. S. Raja Subramani; Dhiraj Seth; R. Hari Kumar; V. R. Chaudhari; Rajnath Singh; Giridhar Aramane; Former: (India) Neelam Sanjiva Reddy; (India) Zail Singh; (India) R. Venkataraman; (India) Shankar Dayal Sharma; (India) K. R. Narayanan; (India) A. P. J. Abdul Kalam; (India) Pratibha Patil; (India) Pranab Mukherjee; (India) Ram Nath Kovind; (India) Indira Gandhi †; (India) Rajiv Gandhi †; (India) V. P. Singh; (India) Chandra Shekhar; (India) P. V. Narasimha Rao; (India) H. D. Deve Gowda; (India) Inder Kumar Gujral; (India) Atal Bihari Vajpayee; (India) Manmohan Singh; Prakash Chandra Sethi; Shankarrao Chavan; Buta Singh; Mufti Mohammad Sayeed; Murli Manohar Joshi; Indrajit Gupta; L. K. Advani; Shivraj Patil; P. Chidambaram; Sushilkumar Shinde; Bali Ram Bhagat; P. Shiv Shankar; N. D. Tiwari; Vidya Charan Shukla; Madhav Singh Solanki; Sikander Bakht; Jaswant Singh; Yashwant Sinha; Natwar Singh; S. M. Krishna; Salman Khurshid; Sushma Swaraj; Lallan Prasad Singh; S. M. H. Burney; K. V. Krishna Rao; Chintamani Panigrahi; K. V. Raghunatha Reddy; Oudh Narayan Shrivastava; Ved Marwah; Arvind Dave; Shivinder Singh Sidhu; Gurbachan Jagat; Ashwani Kumar; Vinod Kumar Duggal; Krishan Kant Paul; Syed Ahmed; V. Shanmuganathan; Padmanabha Acharya; Najma Heptulla; Ganga Prasad; La. Ganesan; Rajkumar Dorendra Singh; Rishang Keishing; Rajkumar Jaichandra Singh; Rajkumar Ranbir Singh; Wahengbam Nipamacha Singh; Radhabinod Koijam; Okram Ibobi Singh; R N Sheopory; S D Chowdhury; Shival Swarup; J F Ribeiro; T G L Iyer; S D Pandey; P G Harlarnkar; Kanwar Pal Singh Gill; S Subramanian; D P N Singh; S V M Tripathi; M B Kaushal; M N Sabharwal; Trinath Mishra; S C Chaube; Jyoti Kumar Sinha; S I S Ahmed; V K Joshi; A S Gill; Vikram Srivastava; K. Vijay Kumar; Pranay Sahay; Dilip Trivedi; Prakash Mishra; K. Durga Prasad; R. R. Bhatnagar; Anand Prakash Maheshwari; Kuldiep Singh; Bipin Rawat †; Om Prakash Malhotra; K. V. Krishna Rao; Arun Shridhar Vaidya; Krishnaswamy Sundarji; Vishwa Nath Sharma; Sunith Francis Rodrigues; Bipin Chandra Joshi; Shankar Roychowdhury; Ved Prakash Malik; Sundararajan Padmanabhan; Nirmal Chander Vij; J. J. Singh; Deepak Kapoor; V. K. Singh; Bikram Singh; Dalbir Singh Suhag; Bipin Rawat; Manoj Mukund Naravane; Ronald Lynsdale Pereira; Oscar Stanley Dawson; Radhakrishna Hariram Tahiliani; Jayant Ganpat Nadkarni; Laxminarayan Ramdas; Vijai Singh Shekhawat; Vishnu Bhagwat; Sushil Kumar; Madhvendra Singh; Arun Prakash; Sureesh Mehta; Nirmal Kumar Verma; Devendra Kumar Joshi; Robin K. Dhowan; Sunil Lanba; Karambir Singh; Idris Hasan Latif; Dilbagh Singh; Lakshman Madhav Katre †; Denis La Fontaine; Surinder Mehra; Nirmal Chandra Suri; S. K. Kaul; Satish Sareen; Anil Yashwant Tipnis; Srinivasapuram Krishnaswamy; Shashindra Pal Tyagi; Fali Homi Major; Pradeep Vasant Naik; Norman Anil Kumar Browne; Arup Raha; Birender Singh Dhanoa; R. K. S. Bhadauria; Shankarrao Chavan; K. C. Pant; Sharad Pawar; Pramod Mahajan; Mulayam Singh Yadav; George Fernandes; Jaswant Singh; A. K. Antony; Arun Jaitley; Manohar Parrikar; Nirmala Sitharaman; K. P. A. Menon; P. K. Kaul; S. M. Ghosh; S. K. Bhatnagar; T. N. Seshan; Naresh Chandra; Narinder Nath Vohra; K. A. Nambiar; T. K. Banerjee; Ajit Kumar; T. R. Prasad; Yogendra Narain; Subir Dutta; Ajay Prasad; Ajai Vikram Singh; Shekhar Dutt; Vijay Singh; Pradeep Kumar; Shashi Kant Sharma; R. K. Mathur; G. Mohan Kumar; Sanjay Mitra; Ajay Kumar	RK Meghen (POW); N. Bisheshwar Singh; Achou Toijamba; Senggoi Meetei; R. K. Tulachandra †; Irengbam Chaoren; Thang Lian Pau; Thuingaleng Muivah; S. S. Khaplang

Strength
1,325,000	1,500; 2,500; 500 PREPAK; 600 KYKL; 100 KCP; 4,500 NSCN-IM; 2,000 NSCN-K

Casualties and losses
Since 1992; 1,081+ Killed	Since 1992; 2,895+ killed
- 2,253+ civilians killed since 1992; 152 unspecified killed since 2000 50,000+ killed in total (1950–Present)

The Insurgency in Manipur is an ongoing armed conflict between India and several separatist rebel groups, taking place in the state of Manipur. The insurgency in Manipur is part of the wider insurgency in Northeast India; it displays elements of a national liberation war as well as an ethnic conflict.

== Background ==
Manipur has been an "independent kingdom" since at least 33 AD. The Kingdom of Manipur was integrated as a princely state of India following the brief Anglo-Manipur War of 1891.

After Manipur signed the Instrument of Accession at the time of Indian independence in 1947, it was merged into India in October 1949, and governed as a centrally-administered Chief Commissioner's Province. The status insulted Manipur's historical imagination of independence, which turned into resentment after the Naga Hills district was granted statehood in 1962.

The road to the statehood of Manipur has been violent. On 23 October 1969, when Indira Gandhi visited Manipur, members of the public pelted stones at her when she was delivering her speech. People set one police vehicle and an ambulance on fire. One police driver died and 66 police personnel were injured. The police also killed 4 civilians and injured 6 others. On 16 February 1970, the UAC (United Action Committee) launched a major strike across all constituencies. In March 1970, they launched pickets at the Secretariat and DC office for the cause of statehood. Police arrested 521 persons and registered 21 cases. As they could not be lodged in the jail, they were taken to the sub-jail at Pallel. The self-styled President of Meitei State W. Tomba was arrested with 4 members. They were sentenced to life imprisonment.

The neglect of statehood of Manipur, the Nagaland statehood in 1963 via violence and foreign support from then East Pakistan and China, helped the formation of many insurgent groups in North-East India including Manipur.

Manipur's incorporation into the Indian state soon led to the formation of many insurgent organizations, seeking the creation of an independent state within Manipur's borders and dismissing the merger with India as involuntary.

During the post-colonial period, as ethnic identities became increasingly politicised and separate from cultural context, tribes such as Anal, Moyon, Monsang and Maring, who share cultural similarities with the other Kuki tribes, started identifying themselves as Naga. This is seen as a milestone for the consolidation of Naga nationalism by United Naga Council and National Socialist Council of Nagaland-Isak Muivah.

== History ==
The annexation of Manipur in 1949 led to a split in the polity of Manipur. Political organizations such as Manipur State Congress actively campaigned for union with India while organizations such as Praja Sangh and other parties opposed the union. During this time, Hijam Irabot, a leader of the Communist Party of Manipur was in touch with the Communist Party of Burma to arrange for the training of the militant wing of the party, the Red Guards. After Irabot's death, the movement split into various factions.

In the second wave of the insurgency, the first separatist faction, known as United National Liberation Front (UNLF), was founded on 24 November 1964. However, they did not take armed action until 1991. Between 1977 and 1980, the People's Liberation Army of Manipur (PLA), People's Revolutionary Party of Kangleipak (PREPAK) and the Kangleipak Communist Party (KCP), were formed, immediately joining the war.

Naga insurgency began in 1980s with the founding of the National Socialist Council of Nagaland. This was followed by the formation of Kuki National Front and the Kuki National Organisation, and its armed wing, the Kuki National Army, in 1987 and 1988 respectively.

On 8 September 1980, Manipur was declared an area of disturbance when the Indian Government imposed the Armed Forces (Special Powers) Act, 1958 on the region; the act currently remains in force. The provision was lifted in various parts of Manipur in March 2023.

The parallel rise of Naga nationalism in neighboring Nagaland led to the emergence of National Socialist Council of Nagaland (NSCN) activities in Manipur. Clashes between the Isak-Muivah and Khaplang factions of NSCN further aggravated tensions, as Kuki tribals began creating their own guerrilla groups in order to protect their interests from alleged Naga violations. Other ethnic groups such as Paite, Vaiphei, Pangals and Hmars followed suit, establishing militant groups.

== Current situation ==
In contrast with the other insurgencies in Northeast India, Manipur-based militants are characterized by a low level of defections and a well organized intelligence network. They have also avoided targeting local police personnel, thus aiming to secure popular support.

Extortion remains the main source of funding for militant groups. Hindu Temples, educational institutions and businesses are known to have been targeted with illegal taxation. As many as 26 permanent tax collection checkpoints have been set up on the NH-39 and NH-53 National Highways. Militants have also resorted to abducting children and later employing them as child soldiers.

The first suspension of operations (SoO) was signed in 2005 between Kuki militant organizations and the Indian army. In August 2008, a tripartite suspension of operations (SoO) agreement was signed between the Government of India, the Government of Manipur and 25 Kuki militant organizations to establish a ceasefire. The agreement lead to a ceasefire and laying down of arms by Kuki militant groups and began the process of negotiations. On 10 March 2023, the Government of Manipur withdrew from the suspension of operations agreement with Kuki National Army and Zomi Revolutionary Front.

From 3 May 2023, Manipur witnessed ethnic violence, which led to a separation of valley and hill areas with purging of Kukis and Meiteis from respective areas. This marked a new era in Manipur's insurgency, where the militant groups of respective ethnic communities witnessed a resurgence in membership.

== List of militant organizations as per ethnicity ==
Militant organizations in Manipur display different ethnic loyalties and a range of ideologies.

Ethnic-based militant groups in Manipur
Ethnic Group	Militant Groups/Factions
Meitei	1. United National Liberation Front (UNLF); 2. People's Liberation Army Of Manipur (PLA/PLAM/PLA-MP); 3. People's Revolutionary Party of Kangleipak (PREPAK) (Note: The above-mentioned three groups now operate from a unified platform under the Manipur People's Liberation Front); 4. Kangleipak Communist Party (KCP); 5. Kanglei Yawol Kanna Lup (KYKL); 6. Manipur Liberation Tiger Army (MLTA); 7. Iripak Kanba Lup (IKL); 8. People's Republican Army (PRA); 9. Kangleipak Kanba Kanglup (KKK); 10. Kangleipak Liberation Organisation (KLO)
Kuki	1. Kuki National Army; 2. Kuki National Front (Military Council); 3. Kuki Liberation Army (Manipur); 4. Kuki National Front (Kukiland); 5. Kuki Revolutionary Army (Unification); 6. United Old Kuki Liberation Army; 7. United Komrem Revolutionary Army; 8. United Socialist Revolutionary Army; 9. Kuki National Front (Samuel); 10. Kuki Revolutionary Army; 11. Kuki National Front (President); 12. Hmar People Convention (Democratic); 13. Kuki Liberation Army (UPF); 14. United Kuki Liberation Front; 15. United Komrem People Council; 16. Hmar People's Convention-Democracy (HPC-D); 17. Chin Kuki Revolutionary Front (CKRF)
Naga	1. National Socialist Council of Nagaland-Isak-Muivah (NSCN-IM); 2. National Socialist Council of Nagaland (Khaplang)
Zo	1. Zomi Revolutionary Army (ZRA); 2. Hmar People's Convention-Democracy (HPC-D)

== Timeline ==
The following is an incomplete list of events relating to the insurgency in Manipur. Most of these events cannot be independently verified because news journalists usually have very limited access to reaching the areas where the fighting takes place.

- 24 November 1964, Arambam Somorendra founded United National Liberation Front.
- 19 January 1982, Sikh Regiment Jawans coming in three vehicles were ambushed at Namthilok along Imphal-Ukhrul Road to Imphal. In that 21 Jawans were killed and 5 were injured.
- 13 April 1982, 9 PLA active members, including chairman Kunjabihari, were killed at Kodompokpi, Nambol.
- 15 March 1984, UGs snatched 2 SLRs from the CRPF camp at Heirangoithong. In the tussle 1 UG and 1 Jawan died. 12 civilians who were playing and watching Volleyball on the ground got killed by indiscriminate firing, 27 others sustained injury.
- 30 January 1984, the hill UGs murder Yangmaso Shaiza, Ex CM Manipur.
- 12 November 1985, R.K .Tulachandra Singh, Chairman of PREPAK was killed in action.
- 4 July 2000, 18 insurgents surrendered to the authorities of Imphal in the presence of Manipur Chief Minister Nipamacha Singh.
- 18 September 2001, the Indian military killed 5 PLA members during a shootout in the Khoupum valley, Tamenglong district.
- 10 February 2003, a KYKL ambush leads to the death of 5 Border Security Force personnel, in Leingangtabi along the Imphal-Moreh road.
- 16 January 2005, security forces uncovered a PLA camp in Theogtang Zoukanou, Churachandpur district. A total of 76 rifles, 20 small arms, and large amounts of ammunition were seized.
- 30 June 2005, 5 policemen and 4 PLA rebels were slain in a clash, in Thangjng Ching, Churachandpur district. A radio set, weapons, as well as documentation were confiscated from the dead guerrillas.
- 16 August 2006 ISKCON Bomb blast killed 5 people and injured 30.
- 17 August 2007, police arrested 12 rebels from the official residences of three Members of the Legislative Assembly in Imphal.
- 31 November 2010, authorities detained UNLF chairman Rajkumar Meghen, the incident took place in Motihari, Bihar.
- 15 April 2011, a NSCN-IM ambush resulted in the death of 8 people and the injury of 6 others; the victims belonged to the Manipur Legislative Assembly and the Manipur police. The incident took place in Riha, Yeingangpokpi 12 km from Imphal after the then MLA Wungnaoshang Keishing conference meeting, Ukhrul district.
- 1 August 2011, 5 people were killed and 8 others injured when National Socialist Council of Nagaland-Isak Muivah rebels detonated a bomb outside a barber shop in the Sanghakpam Bazaar, Imphal.
- 30 April 2012, 103 rebels belonging to UNLF, PULF, KYKL, PREPAK, KNLF, KCP, PLA, UNPC, NSCN-IM, NSCN-K, UPPK and KRPA and KRF, surrendered before the Chief Minister Ibobi Singh during a ceremony at Mantripukhri in the Imphal West District.
- 14 September 2013, an IED detonated in a tent housing migrant workers in the city of Imphal, killing at least 9 and injuring 20 people.
- 20 February 2015, security forces conducted a number of raids in the areas of Wangjing and Khongtal, arresting 5 PREPAK cadres.
- 23 May 2015, security forces carried out a joint operation in the village of Hingojang, Senapati district. Three rebels were killed, and one was detained after the rebels offered armed resistance.
- 4 June 2015 - 2015 Manipur ambush: Guerrillas ambushed a military convoy in Chandel district, killing 18 soldiers and wounding 15 others. UNLFW claimed responsibility for the attack.
- 9 June 2015 - 2015 Indian counter-insurgency operation in Myanmar: Operators of the 21st Para SF Battalion of the Indian army carried out a cross border operation into Myanmar, which resulted in the death of approximately 20 rebels including those who attacked an army convoy on 4 June. Commandos went a few kilometers inside the Myanmar territory to destroy two camps of insurgents hiding there after their attacks in Manipur and Arunachal Pradesh on 4 June by NSCN(K) and KYKL outfits.
- 22 May 2016, rebels ambushed and killed six Indian paramilitary soldiers in Manipur, India near the northeastern region bordering Myanmar.
- 13 November 2021, rebels ambushed a convoy belonging to the Assam Rifles, killing five Indian soldiers and two civilians in Churachandpur district, Manipur. The deceased also included an Indian Army Colonel Viplav Tripathi and his family. Indian police suspect that rebels belonging to People's Liberation Army of Manipur (PLA) were responsible for the ambush.
- 3 May 2023 — 2023 Manipur violence : Ethnic violence breaks out between the Meitei people and the –-Zo people in the state of Manipur. The violence killed 258 people and injured more than 3000 people. The violence was accompanied by a resurgence of insurgency groups in the region.
- 19 September 2025, Two Assam Rifles personnel are killed and five are injured in an ambush by People's Liberation Army of Manipur militants in Bishnupur district, Manipur.

== See also ==
- Kuki–Naga conflict
- Kuki–Paite ethnic clash of 1997–1998
- 1993 Manipur riot
- 2015 Manipur ambush
- 2015 Indian counter-insurgency operation in Myanmar
- 2016 Manipur unrest
- Viplav Tripathi
- Human rights abuses in Manipur
- Child soldiers in India
- Separatist movements of India
- Insurgency in Northeast India
- Insurgency in Nagaland
