= People's Democratic Council of Karbi Longri =

Militant group in India (2016–2021)

The People's Democratic Council of Karbi Longri (PDCK) was an armed militant outfit which sought to obtain sovereignty for the Karbis in India.

PDCK was disbanded on 23 February 2021, and all its members surrendered to state authorities.

== Formation ==
It was formed on 27 October 2016 at an undisclosed location.

A statement was given by the leaders:

"Concurring individuals believing in sovereignty of the Karbis held various discussions earlier this month where the need for a new armed outfit in the district to fight for the rights of the Karbis was strongly felt. Thus, a unanimous decision was taken to give birth to PDCK which was formally formed."

== Leaders ==
- Chairman: Jeksai Kangtang Lijang
- General Secretary: Nongme Tungjang
- Chief of Army Staff: Captain David Mukrang

== Affiliations ==
PDCK was affiliated with United National Liberation Front of Western South East Asia (UNLFWSEA), which comprises other militant outfits of the region such as KCP, KLO, KYKL, NDFB, NLFT, NSCN, PREPAK, PREPAK (Pro), RPF and UNLF.
