= KYKL =

KYKL may refer to:

- KYKL (FM), a radio station (90.7 FM) licensed to serve Tracy, California, United States
- KLHQ (FM), a radio station (99.5 FM) licensed to serve Hotchkiss, Colorado, United States, which held the call sign KYKL from 2012 to 2016
- Kanglei Yawol Kanna Lup, a Meitei revolutionary organisation in the state of Manipur in India
