= Indian Civil War =

Indian Civil War may refer to:

- Indian Rebellion of 1857
- Partition of India
- Separatist movements of India
