= Muslim United Liberation Tigers of Assam =

Islamist militant organization in India

- অসমৰ মুছলিম সংযুক্ত মুক্তি বাঘ
- The Black Standard used by (MULTA)
- Dates active: 1996 - 2016
- Allegiance: Al-Qaeda in the Indian Subcontinent (In 2016)
- Headquarters: Assam
- Active regions: Assam, India
- Ideology: Islamism; Jihadism; Islamic extremism Islamic fundamentalism Sunni Islamism; Qutbism; Separatism
- Part of: Tariqah-i-Muhammadiya movement in Bengal (In 2024)
- Wars: Insurgency in Northeast India
- Website: https://assamiya.alemarah.rc

Muslim United Liberation Tigers of Assam (MULTA) was an Islamist extremist organization founded around 1996 in the eastern Indian state of Assam by mostly Bengali-origin Muslims and indigenous Muslims in Assam after being influenced by the Taliban victory in 1996 and establishment of Islamic emirate in Afghanistan. The organization demands Assam as an Islamic state under Sharia and separate from India for the Muslims of Assam. The South Asia Terrorism Portal (satp.org) describes it as part of the All Muslim United Liberation Forum of Assam (AMULFA), and that Muslim United Liberation Front of Assam (MULFA) is a sister organization under the AMULFA umbrella.

According to Indian authorities), the organization is tied to terrorist operations and criminal activity throughout Assam, primarily in Dhubri district, but also in Nagaon, Morigaon and Darrang districts. It sells weapons illegally, and conducts kidnapping and extortion to fund its activities.

It operates in conjunction with other extremist organizations, such as a 20 April 2009 gun battle near Lokra against Indian police, in which the Indian Red Horns division killed three members of the National Democratic Front of Bodoland (NDFB) along with two MULTA members, Baul Ali and Yunis Ali.

It is also asserted by SATP.org to cooperate with the Maoist National Socialist Council of Nagaland-Isak Muivah (NSCM-IM).
