= 1993 Pangal massacre =

1993 riot in Manipur, India

1993 Pangal massacre Meitei–Pangal clash
- Part of Religious violence in India
- Date: 3–4 May 1993
- Location: Imphal Valley, Manipur, India; 24.72046°N 93.94098°E
- Caused by: Rumours, land issues, suspicions of illegal immigration
- Methods: stabbing, burning alive, arson

Parties
Meiteis: Poramelan Apunba; People's Republican Army	Meitei Pangals (Meitei Muslims)

Casualties and losses
4 killed	96–130 killed

Casualties
- Deaths: 100–130
- Injuries: 300
- Arrested: 423
- Damage: 3000
- Location of Lilong Bridge 1993 Pangal massacre (India)

The 1993 Pangal massacre, also called Meitei–Pangal clash, in the state of Manipur, India, involved the killing of over 100 Meitei Pangals, including 20 women and children, at the hands of the Meitei community members, during 3–4 May 1993.

== Background ==
Meitei Pangals represent an "indigenised" Muslim community of Manipur, who speak the native Meitei language and have a consistent record of participating in the political processes of Manipur. However, some tensions between the Meitei community and the Pangals emerged in the years before 1993, caused by Meitei revivalism and anti-minority sentiments resulting from alleged Bangladeshi settlements in Jiribam.

The former leader of the Meitei nationalist insurgent group People's Liberation Army (PLA), N. Bisheshwar Singh, who had been captured by Indian security forces and was out on bail, founded an organisation called Poramelan Apunba in 1992. (Note: Alternative spellings: Puramlan Apunba, Poromlen Apunba, and Poramlen Apunba.) The organisation initially targeted the "outsiders" in Manipur (Indian settlers, called mayangs in Meitei language), but after having formed an alliance with the Hindu nationalist Bharatiya Janata Party (BJP), changed its target to the Meitei Pangals. According to India Today, it had the goal of driving the Meitei Pangals out of the Imphal Valley. It had demanded to build a Meitei temple at the Chingei Ching hillock, (Note: The survey map shows Chingei Ching within the Lilong Pt village at roughly the coordinates 24.6835°N 93.9443°E. However, in other maps the hill is called "Chingkham Hill". There is another hill to the south of it, which is marked as "Chingjao Hill", which has an idgah and a burial ground.) on a site claimed by local Pangals as their burial ground. Also involved in the tensions was the newly formed People's Republican Army (PRA), a splinter group of PLA set up by its dissidents. It is said to have had the goal of countering PLA. The two splinter groups appear to have had bad blood between them.

== Initial incident ==
On 1 May 1993, three Meitei youth belonging to People's Republican Army went to Lilong Sambrukhong, a village in Thoubal district in the Pangal-dominated Lilong area, to meet a gun-runner for collecting promised items. An argument developed and turned into a scuffle, leading the villagers to come to the aid of the Pangal man. The Meitei youth were allegedly roughed up, after which the villagers handed them over to the security personnel of a local politician. They were detained for some time and then released without any further enquiries.

Meanwhile rumours started circulating in the neighbouring Meitei-inhabited areas of Lilong in the Imphal West district that the Meitei youth were severely beaten up by the Pangals and one of them succumbed to the injuries. Communalism Combat reported that a "Boycott Muslim Day" was observed the following day (2 May), instigated by Poromalen Apunba. Rumours were spread claiming that Meitei college students, including girls, were taken hostage and that many Meiteis were killed with their bodies being thrown into the river. Even the police wireless network relayed the rumours.

== Violence ==
On 3 May, a clash developed near the Lilong bridge that separates the Meitei- and Pangal-dominated areas of Lilong, which was described as a "pitched battle" between the Meiteis and Pangals. According to former IPS officer John Shilshi, senior officials reached the spot, but even as they were conferring, one man among the warring groups was killed, probably Meitei. The incident led to further rumours, which took on "alarming proportions" according to commentators.

Violence spread to the Imphal City, which is some 13 km away from Lilong, and the Pangals living or working there were targeted. Crowds slaughtered Pangal rickshaw pullers, pedestrians, bus passengers, and burned their homes and shops. Most victims were stabbed or burned alive, according to the state police chief Alfred Liddle. Four students and an employee of the Manipur University were burned alive, according to a government spokesman. Pangals travelling in buses were pulled down and hacked. They included women with babies in arms, according to a video report from the Hindustan Times Group. One bus was set alight with Pangal passengers locked inside, with sixty people dying in just this one incident.

Violence continued on 4 May, despite a curfew having been declared in the Imphal and Thoubal districts. Villages were torched and hundreds of residents wounded. The New York Times also revealed that at least 20 women and children had died in the violence. 3,000 people were reported to have been displaced and taking shelter in government camps.

The official death toll was 96 Pangals and 4 Meiteis having been killed. But Pangals have reported 130 people having died, and called it a "genocide". Some 300 people were reported injured. The state's top civil servant was reported as admitting, "I am ashamed to talk about the gruesome manner in which [the victims] were killed".

== Aftermath ==
The government brought the situation under control by 5 May. Some 200 people were arrested by 5 May, with the eventual number climbing to 423 persons. Over 100 police cases were registered. Union Minister of State for Home Affairs, Rajesh Pilot, visited Imphal to take stock. He criticised the state government's handling of the situation.

The Organiser (magazine) magazine associated with the Rashtriya Swayamsevak Sangh (RSS) published an analysis towards the end of May, claiming that illegal immigration into Manipur and its "Bangaldeshisation" were the causes of the violence. It put the blame on the votebank policies of the ruling Indian National Congress government in allowing "massive infiltration of Bangladeshis". In contrast Lt. Gen. V. K. Nayar, who was appointed as the Governor in August 1993, alleged that the state's chief minister R. K. Dorendra Singh was supporting Meitei extremist groups and recommended the imposition of President's Rule. In any event, Dorendra Singh government collapsed in December 1993, and President's Rule was imposed, which lasted roughly a year.

The Meitei community rallied to support the victims of the violence, lending a helping hand to rehabilitate them. However their enthusiasm was short-lived. A scholar researching the aftermath noticed villagers living in temporary tents even a decade after the clashes. The relief assistance promised to the victims by the government also appeared not to have reached them. The Sunday magazine commented in 1995 that the 1993 riots appeared to have made the Meitei–Pangal divide unbridgeable.

According to an official of the Indian Government, around 100 people died in the riots. The commission called for increased security and increasing the compensation award to the victims. The Pangal (Manipuri Muslim) Political Forum claimed 140 people were killed. After the Government of India awarded compensation to the victims of the 1984 Punjab riots, the Pangal (Manipuri Muslim) Political Forum demanded compensation from the government in January 2015 at the Manipur Press Club.

== Legacy ==
The date of 3 May 1993 is marked as a Black Day/Sahidee Memorial Day by the Pangals. Observances are held by the All Manipur Muslim Students’ Organization, the Pangal (Manipur Muslim) Political Forum, and the All Manipur Muslim Girl Students’ Organization. Harsh Mander referred to the incident as the "first Major rupture" in communal relations in the Manipur State.

== Bibliography ==
- Mangi Singh, S. (2008), "A Case Study of the May 1993 Riot Victims of Purum Pangaltabi", in Samir Kumar Das (ed.), Blisters on their feet : Tales of internally displaced persons in India's North East, SAGE – via archive.org
- Shilshi, John S. (2020), Vale of Tears - untold stories of violence in Manipur, Blue Rose Publishers
- Tarapot, Phanjoubam (2003), Bleeding Manipur, Har-Anand Publications, ISBN 978-81-241-0902-1
- Verghese, B. G. (1996), India's Northeast Resurgent: Ethnicity, Insurgency, Governance, Development, Konark Publishers
- Thoubal District Census Handbook (PDF), Directorate of Census Operations, Manipur, 2011, archived from the original (PDF) on 13 August 2023
