= Karbi Longri North Cachar Hills Liberation Front =

- Flag of the Karbi Longri N.C. Hills Liberation Front
- Leaders: Pradip Terang (Pongbi Dilli); Men Sing Tokbi (Willingson Timung); Thong Teron
- Dates active: 16 May 2004 – 23 February 2021 (22 years, 4 months, 1 week and 3 days)
- Active regions: Assam, India: Dima Hasao district; Karbi Anglong district
- Ideology: Karbi self-determination (Hemprek Kangthim)
- Size: 100–350
- Wars: the Insurgency in Northeast India

Karbi Longri N.C. Hills Liberation Front was a militant group operating in Karbi Anglong district and Dima Hasao district (formerly known as the North Cachar Hills district) of Assam, India. Thong Teron was the general secretary of KLNLF. Karbi Anglong NC Hills People's Resistance was the armed wing of the organization. KLNLF emerged from the United People's Democratic Solidarity, being against the peace talks between the UDPS and the government. After the split, there have been turf wars between the two groups.

In July 2008, the Assam government estimated that KLNLF had a membership of 225. KLNLF was closely linked to the United Liberation Front of Asom. 6 December was the foundation day of KLNLF.

On 23 February 2021, KLNLF was disbanded. All its members surrendered to state government.

== Objectives ==
The outfit claimed to fight for the cause of Karbi tribes and its declared objective was Hemprek Kangthim, meaning self-rule/self-determination of the Karbi people.

== Leadership, cadre and area of operation ==
Pradip Terang alias Pongbi Dilli was the ‘Chairman’ of the outfit. Har Sing Timung was the General Secretary till 2 January 2005, when he resigned from his position following serious differences with the ‘Commander-in-Chief’ Men Sing Takbi alias Willingson Timung. Laden Ronghang is the ‘Publicity Secretary’ of the group and ‘Incharge Central Publicity Cell’ is Thong Teron alias Rupsing Teron. The Assistant Foreign Secretary/ Revenue/Finance/Taxation of the outfit is Biren Lekthe alias Risso Tokbi.

The outfit had around 200 militants operating in the Karbi Anglong district. The KLNLF Commander-in-Chief, Willingson Timung, was killed along with two other cadres by the General Secretary, Hor Sing Timung, on 2 February 2005. Later on 29 April 2005, Hor Sing Timung along with other four associates was executed by the outfit at a camp in Bangladesh for their involvement in the murder of Timung.

While the group’s stronghold was Karbi Anglong district, its presence had also been reported from Dima Hasao and Nagaon districts.

In January 2011, the Karbi People's Liberation Tigers split to the KLNCHLF, starting seeking to continue the armed struggle, categorically opposing the peace talks.

== Linkage ==
The outfit maintained close links with the United Liberation Front of Asom (ULFA). The ULFA’s ‘709th battalion’ operated out of two major bases in Karbi Anglong, with the KLNLF providing it with logistic support in return for weapons and ammunition.

It also reportedly had links with the Nagaland-based National Socialist Council of Nagaland - Isak-Muivah (NSCN-IM). On 11 May 2004, 31 KLNLF militants along with five NSCN-IM militants were arrested from a bus on the Paren-Ghaspani Road on their way to Dimapur. These militants had undergone training at a NSCN-IM camp and were reportedly part of the recent batch that passed out from there. On 13 October 2007, security forces neutralized a joint camp of the NSCN-IM and KLNLF inside Kaki Reserve Forest area in the Karbi Anglong district.

== Funds ==
Abductions for ransom and extortion were the main sources of funds for the group. According to official sources, the outfit generated a considerable amount of revenue by targeting the ginger producing Kukis in the Singhason Hills area. The non-Karbi Hindi – speaking traders are also targeted for extortion. In some cases, even the Karbis were targeted for extortion.

== See also ==
- Insurgency in Northeast India
