= Jagran Josh =

Indian website

- Website type: Education, Jobs, and Career Portal
- Available in: Hindi, English
- Owner: Jagran New Media
- Parent: MMI Online Limited
- Website: jagranjosh.com
- Launched: 2008
- Current status: Active
- Content license: Standard Copyright

Jagran Josh is an Indian website that covers topics related to education, employment, and competitive examinations. It includes content on current affairs, general knowledge, exam notifications, results, and study materials for exams such as Banking, MBA, CBSE, IAS/PCS, and SSC.

== History ==
Jagran Josh was launched on December 28, 2008 as a web platform focused on examinations and educational content in India. It is part of Jagran New Media, the digital division of Jagran Prakashan Limited, which operates online news portals, informational websites, video content platforms, and a digital production unit.

In 2023, Jagran Josh partnered with the Embassy of the United States to conduct a campaign related to U.S. student visa information. The same year, it collaborated with the CARE Lab at Temple University to launch the 'Being Cyberwise' campaign, which aimed to raise awareness about cybercrime in India. The initiative included informational videos featuring cybersecurity professionals and addressed topics such as personal security, phishing, ransomware, and online scams. The campaign ran for three weeks.

== Awards ==
- Global Digital Marketing Awards
