= United People's Democratic Solidarity =

- Leader: Kiri Rongphar (founder)
- Dates active: March 1999–2014
- Active regions: Assam, India: Karbi Anglong district; Dima Hasao district (minor activity)
- Ideology: Karbi self-determination (Hemprek Kangthim)
- Wars: the Insurgency in Northeast India

United People's Democratic Solidarity was formed in India in March 1999 with the merger of two insurgent outfits in the state of Assam's Karbi Anglong district, the Karbi National Volunteers (KNV) and Karbi People's Front (KPF).

The outfit signed a ceasefire agreement for one year with the Union Government on 23 May 2002. However, this led to a split in the UPDS, with one faction deciding to continue with its subversive activities while the other commenced negotiations with the Government. Currently, there are two factions: pro-talks and anti-talks. On 16 May 2004, the UPDS (Anti-Talks) rechristened itself as the Karbi Longri North Cachar Hills Liberation Front (KLNLF) and its armed wing as the Karbi Longri North Cachar Hills Resistance Force (KNPR).

== Leadership ==
Kiri Rongphar was the founder ‘chairman’ of the outfit. He was arrested on 22 October 1999. On 22 August 2002, UPDS 'commander-in-chief' Long Kumar Kiling died of injuries sustained during a feline attack in the forests of Karbi Anglong district. Although this has not been proven.

After that, the outfit was headed by its Chairman Longder Singner alias H E Kathar and General Secretary Horen Singh Bey. T Nongloda was the outfit's Publicity Secretary and Lindok Ronghang its Finance Secretary.

The total cadre strength of the UPDS was estimated to be a little more than 150, of which at least 50 were believed to be armed with sophisticated weapons.

== Areas of operation ==
The outfit's main area of operations was in the Karbi Anglong district, with a relatively minor presence in Dima Hasao district.

== Linkages ==
The outfit was known to have grown with the active assistance of the National Socialist Council of Nagaland-Isak-Muivah (NSCN-IM), which provided it with arms and ammunition. It was also reported to have procured arms and ammunition from Bhutan and Bangladesh.

The UPDS also shared a ‘working relationship’ with the National Democratic Front of Bodoland (NDFB) and the United Liberation Front of Asom (ULFA).

== Funds ==
Abductions for ransom and extortion were the main sources of income for the UPDS. The outfit generates a considerable amount of revenue by targeting the ginger-producing Kukis in the Singhason Hills area. The non-Karbi traders were also targeted for extortion. In some cases, even Karbi's had been the targets.

== Peace talks ==
The outfit held six rounds of peace talks with the State and Union Government representatives between 2002 and 2006. The last round of talks was held on 26 July 2006. Subsequently, the outfit pulled out of the talks process, complaining of a lack of progress on its core demands. The outfit's cadres are lodged in one government-guarded designated camp at Diphu with 60 cadres, two main camps and several sub-camps.

In August 2011, the Government of India released a statement wherein it planned to sign peace pacts with UPDS.

As of 25 November 2011, the Outfit has signed a tripartite peace accord with the Government Of India for reorganizing the existing autonomous district (Karbi Anglong) under the Sixth Schedule of the Constitution into four administrative districts for better administrative and developmental administration.

As part of the restructuring and empowerment process, the existing autonomous council will be renamed the Karbi Anglong Autonomous Territorial Council.

The proposed Karbi Anglong Autonomous Territorial Council will have 50 members to give greater representation to people living in remote and isolated clusters of villages.

Of these, 44 will be elected members, and six will be nominated by the governor of Assam.

According to the MoS, the increase in seats will be applicable from subsequent elections, due in the year 2016-17 or mid-term poll, if any, whichever is earlier.

Altogether 39 subjects will be transferred to the proposed Karbi Anglong Autonomous Territorial Council and its chief and deputy chief will have status equivalent to that of the cabinet minister and the other executive council members equivalent to the minister of state.

In the MoS, it was also mentioned that the state government would provide support for relief and rehabilitation of the members of the UPDS, besides organising vocational classes for them.

It stated that special psychological counselling and career guidance classes would also be held at the designated camps of UPDS to facilitate rehabilitation of its cadres.

As of 14 December 2014, the UPDS has formally disbanded following the mass surrender of all its cadres and leaders.

On 23 February 2021, KLNLF was disbanded. All its members surrendered to the state government.
