= Dima Halam Daogah =

Dima Halam Daogah was an Indian extremist group operating mainly in the northeastern Assam and Nagaland states. The group laid down their arms in January 2013, and claimed to represent the Dimasa and their goal to create a Dimaland or Dimaraji in the two states.

== Objective ==
The Dima Halam Daoga (DHD) is a descendant of the Dimasa National Security Force (DNSF), which ceased operations in 1995. Commander-in-Chief Jewel Gorlosa refused to surrender and launched the Dima Halam Daogah. After the peace agreement between the DHD and the central government in the year 2003, the group splintered further and DHD(J) also known as Black Widow was born which was led by Jewel Gorlosa. The Black Widow's declared objective is to create Dimaraji for the Dimasa people in Dima Hasao district only. However The objective of DHD (Nunisa faction) is to include parts of Cachar, Karbi Anglong, and Nagaon districts in Assam, and sections of Dimapur district in Nagaland.

== Activities ==
Th DHDs are active mainly in the district of Dima Hasao of Assam. Their presence can be felt in all the territories demanded by them to be included in Dimaraji. Their activities included extortion to fund their movement and a regular volleys and parleys with the representatives of the state government and the central government to fulfill their demands.

== Organization ==
In 2009, despite hemorrhaging troops to surrenders and captures, the DHD(J) faction was estimated to have around 400 active cadres while the DHD(N) was estimated to have around 800-1200 active cadres. The chairman of the DHD(N) is Pranab Nunisa who came to power on 24 June 2004, after a takeover which ousted founder Jewel Garlossa. The chairman of the DHD is Dilip Nunisa. Other major figures include Kanta Langthasa, Yathong Dimasa, and Rongsling Dimasa.

The DHD has been linked to many other separatist organizations in India, including the National Democratic Front of Bodoland, NSCN and the ULFA.

India banned the Dima Halam Daogah (DHD)-Black Widow militant group in the wake of its involvement in several incidents of violence in Assam on 2 July 2009.

== Mass Surrender in September 2009 ==
The group surrendered en masse to the CRPF and local police, prior to a deadline, with 193 cadres surrendering on 2009-09-12 and another 171 on the 13th. This may include 138 armed cadre of DHD-J. Arms surrendered included 37 AK series assault rifles, ten M-16 rifles, 11 US carbines, two each of Self-Loading Rifles (SLR) and M-21 rifle, one each of Ins as rifle, sten gun, 40-mm gun, Universal Machine Gun (UMG), Rocket Propelling Gun (RPG) and 9-mm pistols. In addition, 7,303 grenades and over 10,000 assorted ammunition were surrendered.

== Ceasefire and End of Operations ==
DHD-N had been in a somewhat tenuous truce with the central government since 2003, but this truce was mired with conflict and skirmishes and only served to demonstrate the lack of GOI interest in the issue.

Both DHD factions entered into new talks and truces with the GOI in late 2009 following incidents of surrender and capture, and the issue of settlement of these militants caused tensions between rival KLNLF and DHD. Nevertheless, a tense peace emerged as various domestic and inter-state civilian and militant groups called on the Indian Government as well as the DHD to expedite talks and resolve the fighting. However, the DHD accused the GOI of not showing enthusiasm during the talks, and they began to show signs of stalling by mid-2010. The Dima National Democratic Front also surrendered to the govt after the DHD factions entered talks.

On 4 September 2010, a new militant group called the Dima National Democratic Front announced its formation, alleging that the truce between the DHD factions and the GOI have caused the Dimasa people to be unprotected from other non-Dima tribes and militias. Around the same time, the Hill Tiger Force, a militia drawing from the Naga, Kuki, and Hmar peoples, was formed in the region. Several activists condemned the new militant groups, and accused other rebel groups such as NSCN of backing the rebels and attempting to restart the violence in the North Cachar Hills.

On 18 August 2011, the formation of a new police battalion composed of surrendered DHD-N and Black Widow/DHD-J militants was announced by the Central Govt, but this was hindered by stalled peace talks. On 20 December 2011, the National Dimasa Protection Army was also formed, due to dissatisfaction with the ongoing talks. By mid-2012, though talks were said to have reached their 'final stage', dissatisfaction and disagreement about the terms caused the peace process to be further lengthened, with Dimasa organizations advocating for the expansion of the soon-to-be-created Dima Hasao Autonomous District Council. For similar reasons, another Dima militant group, the Dima Jadi Naiso Army was created sometime in October 2012. Despite these issues, DHD-J was disbanded on 27 November 2012, with 100 of its cadres being absorbed into the Assamese police, 200 others being educated on re-integration, and the rest also laying down arms.

Following this, the DHD-N also laid down their arms, and in October 2012 plans were made for 1,152 DHD-N cadres to lay down arms and re-integrate into the mainstream. This was fulfilled in January 2013.

Dissatisfaction within the ranks of Dima groups also led to the rise of the Dima Hasao National Army, which began operations sometime in early 2014. Violent incidents regarding dissident DHD members continued to be reported into 2015.

Lingering issues with the settlement would eventually lead to the outbreak of the DNLA uprising in 2019.

== See also ==
- Insurgency in Northeast India
