= G. Bidai =

Bodo militant

- Born: Bishnu Basumatary; Oxiguri Gaon (Moinamata), Kahitama, Baksa district, Assam
- Organization: National Democratic Front of Boroland
- Judicial status: Absconder
- Reward amount: ₹ 5 Lakh ($6,433)
- Wanted by: National Investigation Agency

G Bidai (also known as Bishnu Gayari and Bishnu Goyari) is the Commander and Vice-president of the militant outfit National Democratic Front of Boroland (NDFB). He is on the National Investigation Agency's (NIA)'s most wanted list, a primary counter-terrorist task force of India, with a bounty of Rupess 0.5 Million.

The Indian Army led several unsuccessful operations to kill or capture Bidai.

== Criminal acts ==
In 2014, while Bidai was deputy Army chief of the NDFB, killed Priya Basumatary, a class 10 student, on suspicion of being a police informer, at Dwimuguri village in the Chirang district of Assam. Her killing was video graphed by Bidai's partners, and the villagers were warned not to touch her body, otherwise they would face the same fate.

The killing of Priya Basumatary was widely protested and several civic bodies condemned and demanded a bravery award for her. All Assam Students Union (AASU), All Bodo Students Union (ABSU), All Bodo Women's Welfare Federation, and Bodoland People's Front (BPF) arranged protested over the brutal killing.

Bidai was also involved in the massacre in Kokrajhar districts on 23 December 2014. Also, He was involved in the serial bombings in Assam on 31 October 2008.

== Wanted status ==
Speaking to The Indian Express, in 2016, the then Director general of police (DGP) of Assam, Mukesh Sahay and Additional director general of police (ADGP) R. M. Singh announced an Rs. 5 Lakh of reward for Bidai.

Bidai was also involved in the 2008 Assam bombings that killed 88 civilians, injuring nearly 500 civilians, in which 13 other NDFB leaders, cadres, and helpers including the NDFB Chairman Ranjan Daimary were convicted by the CBI (Central Bureau of Investigation) court. Bidai was declared as an absconder.

Though Bidai is likely to come to the mainstream as per media reports, the NIA still has listed him as most wanted.
