= Jyoti Kumar Sinha =

Indian police chief (born 20th century

Jyoti Kumar Sinha (born 20th century) is an Indian government official.

He served as director general of the Central Reserve Police Force and later as a member of the National Disaster Management Authority and Research and Analysis Wing chief. He is a Bihar cadre Indian Police Service officer of the 1967 batch.

== Early life ==
J.K. Sinha was born in Patna, Bihar. He completed his schooling from St. Xavier's High School, Patna and then graduated with honours in history from Patna College. He joined the Indian Police Service in 1967 following in the footsteps of his father and grandfather. His grandfather, late Shri A.K. Sinha, was the first Indian to become IG of Police, Bihar way back in 1939. J.K. Sinha's father was also an IP officer who also rose to head Bihar Police as IG.

== Awards ==
In 2019, he received the Padma Shri honour for his contribution in the field of social work.
