= Anand Prakash Maheshwari =

Indian civil servant

Dr. Anand Prakash Maheshwari
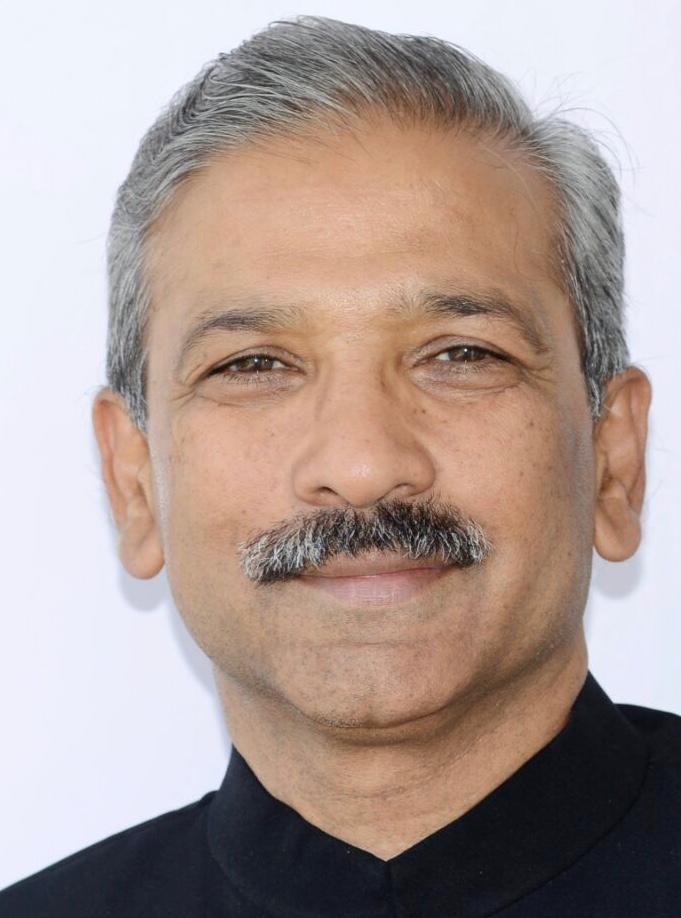
- Dr. Anand Prakash Maheshwari, Former Advisor to Lt. Governor, Puducherry
- Born: 24 February 1961 (age 65)
- Education: Shri Ram College of Commerce
- Police career
- Country: India
- Department: Former Advisor to Lt. Governor, Puducherry
- Rank: Director General of Police(Retd.)
- Website: www.apmaheshwari.me

Dr. Anand Prakash Maheshwari (born 1961) is an IPS officer of 1984 batch, Uttar Pradesh cadre. His professional career as a soldier and policeman culminated as the Head of the largest paramilitary force in India - The Central Reserve Police Force. Post retirement, he was appointed as the Advisor to Hon'ble Lieutenant Governor, Puducherry. He worked in this capacity till the formation of the State government.

== Education ==
An alumnus of Sri Ram College of Commerce, Maheshwari post graduated as MBA, ACS and ACWA before getting inducted into IPS. Later on, during the service, he completed his Doctorate (Ph.D) in Sociology on the subject ‘Management of Communal Violence-Social Conflict Resolution’.

== Career ==
Maheshwari has spent most of his professional career in Uttar Pradesh working as Police Chief in towns of Moradabad, Kanpur, Allahabad and Gorakhpur and also headed Law & Order as well as Vigilance wings of UP Police. He has also worked in Intelligence, Security, Economic Offences, CID, Training & Human Rights divisions of the State Police. He has worked with CRPF on counter insurgency grids of Assam, Kashmir and the states affected by left wing extremism. He has worked in BSF as ADG, BSF Academy/Training and SDG Operations. He has also served as the Director General of Bureau of Police Research & Development, New Delhi and as the Special Secretary (Internal Security), in the Ministry of Home Affairs, Government of India.

== Specializations ==
Dr. Maheshwari specialises in a range of subjects that include leadership, interpersonal relationships, human rights, communal harmony, besides Police Operations from institutions such as London Business School, IIM Ahmadabad, IIPA New Delhi and National Police Academy, Hyderabad. In addition, he is experienced in policing domains such as Counter Insurgency, Homeland Security, Crisis Management, Correctional Administration and Community Policing to Border management.

As part of his self internalization process, he underwent programs on ‘Inner Engineering’ and ‘Bhav Spandan’ from the Isha Foundation, Coimbatore as well as on ‘Yoga and Naturopathy as a Way of Life’ from the Haridwar-based Patanjali Yoga Peeth.

== Decorations ==
Dr. Maheshwari has been the recipient of a number of recognitions which include the President’s Police Medal for Distinguished Service, Police Medal for Gallantry and Police Medal for Meritorious Service. As Head of CRPF, he was also felicitated by President of India on behalf of ECI for excellence in security management during General Elections.

== Community Connections ==
Maheshwari put his activity based services in the assembly line of many NGOs that included ANKUR, AIHASAS (UP), ARUSHI (New Delhi), and RAHAT GHAR project of Jammu & Kashmir for the cause of neglected segments of society such as street children, orphans and widows of militancy, drug addicts and senior citizens. Its aim was to recognise their struggles, channeling socio-economic efforts for their betterment.

== Creative Pursuits ==
Maheshwari has also explored the fields of photography, rural craft, creativity from waste and organic farming, with his fondness for these disciplines rooted in his childhood connection to villages in Rajasthan, ‘Kadel’ in particular.

== Literary life ==
Penning down his real life experiences, Dr. Maheshwari has authored more than a dozen books, the latest one being "HUKUM"- 2020 (LiFi Publications, New Delhi). A recipient of the Govind Ballav Pant Award, his books and anthologies have been fore-worded by luminaries like Dr. APJ Abdul Kalam, former President of India, Ved Marwah, former Governor of Manipur, Gen. V K Singh, former Army Chief, Ruskin Bond, and Kuldeep Nayar and Chandan Mitra, well known journalists. He has devoted two books each to the subjects of Communalism, Insurgency and Cancer patients. "Into the Oblivion" is a narrative on the real-life story of a cancer patient with a focus on life style management and tips for the care takers. He has also dedicated one book each to old age (Salt ‘n’ Pepper) and childhood memories in the eponymous ‘Childhood Nostalgia’. Fluent in English and Hindi, Maheshwari has also published over 40 articles in newspapers and journals like Times of India, Hindustan Times, Indian Police Journal and National Police Academy Journal.
