= People's Revolutionary Party of Kangleipak =

Insurgent group in Manipur, India

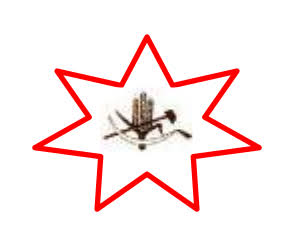
- Flag of PREPAK
- Leader: RK Tulachandra
- Dates active: 19 October 1977 – Present
- Headquarters: Manipur
- Active regions: Northeast India
- Ideology: Communism; Mao Zedong Thought; Separatism
- Size: 200 (2008); 800 (2023); 600 (2026)

The People's Revolutionary Party of Kangleipak (PREPAK) is an armed insurgent group in Manipur demanding a separate and independent homeland. PREPAK was formed under the leadership of R. K. Tulachandra in 1977.

== History ==
PREPAK was formed, in a meeting held on Cheirouching, Imphal, on 9 October 1977. The meeting was attended by R.K. Tulachandra, S. Wanglen, Achamba, Tajila, Meiraba, Meipaksana, Y. Ibohanbi and Paliba, (who were the founding members of PREPAK). After its formation, it launched a series of attacks and ambushes against Manipur Police and Manipur Rifles personnel during the late seventies and early eighties. In 1980, a small group split off from PREPAK and formed the Kangleipak Communist Party (KCP) led by its late leader Y. Ibahanbi.

The founding leader, RK Tulachandra, was killed in an encounter in Kabowakching on 12 November 1985. After his death, S. Wanglen became the Commander-in-Chief of the group. In the late eighties, the group suffered its first factionalism as it split into many small groups. Some of these groups joined other insurgent groups of the state like the PLA and United National Liberation Front (UNLF). The late leader of the group, Urikhingbam Sarat alias Meiraba, with the help of the UNLF and PLA, played a crucial role in reuniting the group.

After unification, PREPAK, along with PLA/RPF and UNLF, launched a social reformation campaign in the state of Manipur. The campaign was aimed at eradicating crimes against women, drug and alcohol addictions etc.

The group's General Secretary L. Masunga was killed on 19 May 1993. After the death of L. Masunga, Subash alias Paliba was elected as the General Secretary, Achamba as Chairman, Naba as Vice-Chairman, Tajila as Commander-in-chief, Chinglemba Mangang as the Defence Secretary. However, Achamba was removed from Chairmanship soon after.

In the early 2000s, the group again split into two factions - one headed by its General Secretary, the other by the Vice-Chairman. Efforts were made by the UNLF, PLA/RPF, KYKL, and KCP to reunite the two factions. Many cadres of both factions lost their lives in factional clashes.

In, 2006/2007, both the factions of PREPAK were re-united. However, another faction led by Defence Secretary Chinglemba Mangang of the General Secretary faction split off to form the United People's Party of Kangleipak (UPPK).

== Area of operation ==
As the cadres are drawn from the Meitei people and the Pangal people, the group operates mainly in the Imphal valley of India and the neighbouring Kabaw Valley in the conflict zone of Myanmar.

It is believed that the group has camps in Myanmar for training in understanding with the NSCN-K.
