= Kanglei Yawol Kanna Lup =

Separatist group in Manipur, India

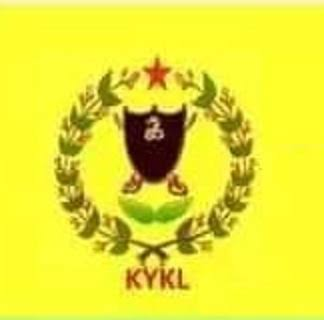
- Flag of kykl
- Leader: Achou Toijamba
- Dates active: 1994 – Present
- Headquarters: Manipur
- Active regions: Northeast India
- Ideology: Communism; Marxism-leninism; Maoism; Separatism
- Size: 900 (2008) 2,400(2023)

Kanglei Yawol Kanna Lup (or Kanglei Yaol Kanba Lup, trans.: "the Organisation to save the revolutionary movement in Manipur") is a Meitei insurgent group that operates in the state of Manipur in India. It was formed in January 1994 by a faction of the United National Liberation Front (UNLF) led by Namoijam Oken in conjunction with splinter groups of Kangleipak Communist Party (KCP) and People's Revolutionary Party of Kangleipak (PREPAK). It is a secessionist organisation and banned by the Government of India. The group displays a strong ethnonationalist and nativist rhetoric in their announcements. (Note: "According to the KYKL Chairman, the incessant influx of non-local people is a strategy of the alien rule.")

== History ==
The United National Liberation Front (UNLF) was formed in 1964 by Arambam Samarendra, with the objective of achieving an independent and socialist Manipur. Following its loss of bases in Bangladesh after the latter's independence, it became a social organisation, and took up arms again in the early 1990s. The Namoijam Oken's faction of UNLF split off from the parent organisation at this stage. In January 1994, it merged with the Ibopishak faction of Kangleipak Communist Party (KCP) and the Meiraba faction of People's Revolutionary Party of Kangleipak (PREPAK) led by Meiraba, to form the KYKL. From the beginning, the organisation appeared to have been allied with the Naga group NSCN-IM, which armed KYKL.

In 1994, N. Oken and another leader Achou Toijamba clashed over organisational matters and the organisation split into two factions: KYKL (O) and KYKL (T). The Toijamba faction tied up with NSCN-K and used its camps in north Myanmar. After five years, the two factions are said to have come together again, with the objective of achieving unity of insurgent groups in the region.

== Activities ==
According to the South Asia Terrorism Portal, the organisation is known for its ruthless measues against civilians and its campaigns to 'cleanse' the education system of Manipur.

The organisation witnessed a resurgence during the 2023 Manipur violence.
