= Kangleipak Communist Party =

- South Asian Communist Flag
- Chairperson: Ibungo Ngangom
- Founded: 14 April 1980
- Preceded by: Kangleipak Communist Party
- Headquarters: Kangleipak (Manipur)
- Armed Wings: Paona Armed Guerrillas (Jungle Warfare Wing) Thangal Armed Guerrillas (Urban Warfare Wing) Bir Tikendrajit Armed Guerrillas (Contingency Response Wing) Miyamgi Fingang Lanmi (Red Army)
- Ideology: Communism; Marxism–Leninism–Maoism

Kangleipak Communist Party is a Maoist separatist militant group in Manipur, India. Named after Kangleipak, the ancient name of Manipur, it was initially led by the communist ideologues — Ibohanbi and Ibopishak. The Kangleipak Communist Party (KCP) has been engaged in an armed conflict against the Government of India.

== Splinter factions ==
The KCP has now been divided into numerous factions, of which the known are:

1. Kangleipak Communist Party (Ibungo Ngangom)
2. Kangleipak Communist Party (People's War Group)
3. Kangleipak Communist Party (Maoist)
4. Kangleipak Communist Party (KK Nganba)
5. Kangleipak Communist Party (Lamyanba Khuman)
6. Kangleipak Communist Party (Noyon)
7. Kangleipak Communist Party (Apunba City Meitei)
8. Kangleipak Communist Party (Military Council)
9. Kangleipak Communist Party (Military Council - Progressive)
10. Kangleipak Communist Party (Military Council - Nongdrenkhomba)
11. Kangleipak Communist Party (Military Council - Taibanganba)

== Background ==
This faction of the Kangleipak Communist Party came into existence in the late 2000s following the failure of certain party leaders to commit themselves to Marxism and Maoism. The incumbent chairman of its Politburo Standing Committee (highest decision-making body), Ibungo Ngangom, who used to head the Information and Public Relations Department of the Kangleipak Communist Party, was the main force behind the emergence of this faction, which has now become the most prominent among the KCP factions. Though it came up as a separate group around 2010, it still sticks to 14 April 1980 as its rising day, because the Kangleipak Communist Party was established on this date.

== Ideology ==
The Kangleipak Communist Party under Ngangom is a group that follows Marxism and Maoism. Its chairman has often spoken about ideological flexibility and adopting the so-called bamboo policy. According to Ngangom, communism is a living ideology and nobody must hesitate to 'adjust' in order to make it realistic and successful. He has also talked about trying to achieve a higher level of compatibility between Marxism and Maoism. The group especially promotes the principle 'from each according to their abilities, to each according to their needs'.

== Organisational structure ==
The Kangleipak Communist Party (Marxist-Leninist-Maoist) under the leadership of Ibungo Ngangom has two main organs: Politburo Standing Committee (PSC), which is a combination of its legislative and judiciary bodies; and General Administrative Council (GAC), which is the executive branch of the group.

=== Politburo Standing Committee ===
The Politburo Standing Committee consists of Ibungo Ngangom (Chairman), Amumacha Mangang (Deputy Chairman), Thoiba Meetei (Senior Member), Wangba Angomcha (Senior Member), Angousana Moi-rangcha (Senior Member), James Paomei (Member), Sanatombi Chanu Lourembam (Member), Moramba Meetei (Member), Tomthin Mangang (Member), Sanatomba (Member), Wangthoi (Member). Initially, it was a five-member committee. But it was expanded into an eleven-member committee during its recent bi-annual conference.

=== General Administrative Council ===
Following the expansion of the politburo standing committee, the general administrative council of the outfit has also been reshuffled as Ibungo Ngangom (Secretary-in-Chief, also heading Foreign Affairs Department, Fund-raising Department and Central Intelligence Wing), Amumacha Mangang (Deputy Secretary-in-Chief), Wangba Angomcha (Secretary, Public Affairs Department), Angousana Moirangcha ( Secretary, Finance & Budgetary Affairs Department), Sanatombi Chanu (Secretary, Information & Public Relations Department), James Paomei (previously Secretary, Public Affairs Department, he will now be Central Liaison Officer, Intra- Departmental Liaison Centre), Thoiba Meetei (previously Secretary, Finance & Budgetary Affairs Department, he will now be Auditor-in-Chief, Audit Commission), Sanatomba Khumancha (previously Commander, Bir Tikendrajit Cadre, i.e. Special Contingency Response Wing, he is now Commander, Paona Cadre, i.e. Jungle Guerrilla Warfare Wing), Moramba Meetei (previously Commander, Paona Cadre, i.e. Jungle Guerrilla Warfare Wing, he is now Commander, Thangal Cadre, i.e. Urban Guerrilla Warfare Wing), Tomthin Mangang (previously Commander, Thangal Cadre, i.e. Urban Guerrilla Warfare Wing, he is now Commander, Bir Tikendrajit Cadre, i.e. Special Contingency Response Wing), Wangthoi ( previously Chief Intelligence Officer, Central Intelligence Wing, he is now Secretary, Capitalistic Concerns Regulation and Taxation Cell), announced the outfit.

== Legal status ==
The Kangleipak Communist Party (Marxist-Leninist-Maoist) is an organization that has been continuously banned under section 35 of the Unlawful Activities (Prevention) Act, 1967 by the Government of India for 'waging war' against the Indian State.

== Relations with other groups ==
The Foreign Affairs Department of the group, which is led by none other than its PSC Chairman has been endeavouring to establish contacts and relations with many communist parties throughout the world. The group is also said to have established some links with certain Maoist groups of Nepal, though it has not openly admitted it. Moreover, in a recent press release, the group has expressed its willingness to cooperate and coordinate with the Communist Party of India (Maoist).

The party used to maintain operational linkages with the National Socialist Council of Nagaland (Khaplang) and the United Liberation Front of Asom.

== Role in 2023 Manipur violence ==
During the 2023 Manipur violence, the Kangleipak Communist Party collaborated with other militant Meitei groups such as United National Liberation Front of Manipur.

== Ban on the Indian Independence Day and Republic Day ==
The Kangleipak Communist Party (Marxist-Leninist-Maoist) has "imposed" a so-called "permanent ban" on the celebrations of Indian Independence Day and Republic Day in Manipur. According to this group, Kangleipak was "annexed" by the Union of India under the guise of the Manipur Merger Agreement, which was signed by the then King of Kangleipak, who no longer had any authority to ink such an agreement as Kangleipak was already a democratic society under the command of an elected body of legislators. So it has been struggling to "reclaim" the "robbed sovereignty" of Kangleipak (Manipur).

== Kangleipak Communist Party (Maoist) ==
In 2009, numerous comrades of the KCP coalesced and organised a convention, and reconstructed the party's Central Committee. Forthwithly after the plenum, they named the faction as "Kangleipak Communist Party (Maoist)," which has now evolved into the Maoist Communist Party of Manipur. However, the Kangleipak Communist Party led by Ibungo Ngangom has emerged as the leading group at least in terms of ideological positions and changes brought about within the group following his release from prison on 4 April 2015 after spending about 12 consecutive years in various prisons in India, including Tihar Jail. According to recent press releases of this group, led by Ibungo Ngangom, the group's primary goal is not only to liberate Kangleipak (Manipur) but also establish communism in Kangleipak through the scientific socialism of Karl Marx. This makes this group a unique communist party of Manipur.

== See also ==
- Insurgency in Northeast India
- Insurgency in Manipur
- 2023 Manipur violence
- People's Liberation Army of Manipur
