= People's Liberation Army of Manipur =

Militant organization

- Yawoll lanme
- Flag of the People's Liberation Army of Manipur
- Leaders: N. Bisheshwar Singh (POW) (1978–1981); Thoudam Kunjabehari † (1981–1982); Irengbam Chaoren #(1982–2023); Manoharmayum Ngouba (2023–present)
- Dates active: September 1978-Present
- Group: Salai Taret 7 clans
- Headquarters: Manipur
- Active regions: Northeast India
- Ideology: Communism; Marxism-Leninism; Mao Zedong Thought; Separatism
- Size: 3,800 (2008); 2,000 (2023)
- Wars: Insurgency in Northeast India; Insurgency in Manipur; 2023-2025 Manipur violence; Naxalite-Maoist insurgency
- Website: plamanipur.com/about/

The People's Liberation Army of Manipur (PLA-MP or PLAM), often shortened to the People's Liberation Army, is a separatist militant group fighting for the creation of an independent and socialist Manipur, a state in northeastern India. It has been waging an armed insurgency against the Indian state. It has a political wing called Revolutionary People's Front.

== History ==
The group founded by N. Bisheshwar Singh on 25 September 1978. Since its founding, it has been waging guerrilla warfare as part of the Insurgency in Manipur against the Indian Armed Forces, and has targeted the Indian Army, Indian Paramilitary Forces and the State Police Force. However, during the late nineties, it declared a unilateral decision not to target the Manipur Police. In 25 February 1979, a political wing called the Revolutionary People's Front (RPF) was formed.

The death of some top leaders in combat (like President Thoudam Kunjabehari in 1982), and the arrest of others (like N. Bisheshwar, arrested in 1981) decreased its military activity in the eighties. The RPF formed a government in exile in Bangladesh, led by Irengbam Chaoren, and began a restructuring of the organisation. The Organisation become very active. Its operation was divided into four sections: Sadar Valley West Hill areas of Manipur, Sadar Hill areas in the east Valley, Hill areas of Manipur and Imphal valley, each with a commander, and other ranks.

On July 13th, 2025, the PLA announced an alliance with the United Liberation Front of Asom and a faction of the National Socialist Council of Nagaland.

== Organisation ==
In 2019, a confession by a PLAM member suggested that PLAM was in touch with Chinese People's Liberation Army. Sixteen platoons of PLAM returned to Manipur after receiving their training in China.

Through the 2023 Manipur violence, the separatist PLAM as well as Kanglei Yawol Kanna Lup (KYKL) witnessed a surge in recruitment of new and previously surrendered soldiers.

On 25 February 2023, after the original chairman Irengbam Chaoren died of illness, Vice Chairman Manoharmayum Ngouba took over Irengbam's position as chairman.

== See also ==
- Communist Party of India (Maoist)
- Maoist Communist Party of Manipur
- National Democratic Front of Bodoland
- People's Liberation Guerrilla Army (India)
