= Assam separatist movements =

Insurgency in Assam, India

Insurgency in Assam
- Part of the Insurgency in Northeast India
- State of Assam
Date	27 November 1990 – present (35 years, 11 months and 2 days)
Location	Assam, India
Status	Ongoing as a low-level insurgency

Belligerents
India; Border conflicts: Bangladesh; Bhutan	ULFA (since 1979); KLO (1995–2023); KLNLF (1990–2021); NDFB (1990–2020); DHD (1990–2013); UPDS (1990–2014)	ACF (1996–2012); ACMA; ANLA	MULTA (1996–2016); AQIS (since 2016)

Commanders and leaders
(India) Droupadi Murmu; (India) Jagdeep Dhankhar; (India) Narendra Modi; (India) Amit Shah; (India) S. Jaishankar; Anish Dayal Singh; Anil Chauhan; Manoj Pande; M. V. Suchindra Kumar; R. Hari Kumar; Dinesh K Tripathi; Vivek Ram Chaudhari; Amar Preet Singh; Nitin Agarwal; Rajnath Singh; Giridhar Aramane; (Bangladesh) Shahabuddin Chuppu; (Bangladesh) Sheikh Hasina; (Bhutan) Jigme Khesar; (Bhutan) Tshering Tobgay; Former: Ramaswamy Venkataraman; Shankar Dayal Sharma; Kocheril Raman Narayanan; Avul Pakir Jainulabdeen Abdul Kalam; Pratibha Patil; Pranab Mukherjee †; Ram Nath Kovind; (India) Krishan Kant; (India) Bhairon Singh Shekhawat; (India) Mohammad Hamid Ansari; (India) Venkaiah Naidu; Chandra Shekhar; Pamulaparthi Venkata Narasimha Rao; Atal Bihari Vajpayee; Haradanahalli Doddegowda Deve Gowda; Inder Kumar Gujral; Manmohan Singh; Shankarrao Chavan; Murli Manohar Joshi; Indrajit Gupta; L. K. Advani; Shivraj Patil; P. Chidambaram; Sushilkumar Shinde; M. C. Chagla; Dinesh Singh; Swaran Singh; Shyam Nandan Prasad Mishra; Bali Ram Bhagat; P. Shiv Shankar; N. D. Tiwari; Vidya Charan Shukla; Madhav Singh Solanki; Dinesh Singh; Sikander Bakht; Jaswant Singh; Yashwant Sinha; Natwar Singh; S. M. Krishna; Salman Khurshid; Sushma Swaraj; Kanwar Pal Singh Gill; S Subramanian; D P N Singh; S V M Tripathi; M B Kaushal; M N Sabharwal; Trinath Mishra; S C Chaube; Jyoti Kumar Sinha; S I S Ahmed; V K Joshi; A S Gill; Vikram Srivastava; K. Vijay Kumar; Pranay Sahay; Dilip Trivedi; Prakash Mishra; K. Durga Prasad; R. R. Bhatnagar; Anand Prakash Maheshwari; Kuldiep Singh; Bipin Rawat †; Sunith Francis Rodrigues; Bipin Chandra Joshi; Shankar Roychowdhury; Ved Prakash Malik; Sundararajan Padmanabhan; Nirmal Chander Vij; J. J. Singh; Deepak Kapoor; V. K. Singh; Bikram Singh; Dalbir Singh Suhag; Bipin Rawat †; Manoj Mukund Naravane; V. K. Sood; Vijai Singh; Surinder Nath; M. L. Dar; Ved Prakash Malik; Chandra Shekhar; Vijay Oberoi; Nirmal Chander Vij; Shantonu Choudhry; Bhupinder Singh Thakur; S. Pattabhiraman; Deepak Kapoor; Milan Lalitkumar Naidu; Noble Thamburaj; Prabodh Chandra Bhardwaj; Arvinder Singh Lamba; S. K. Singh; Dalbir Singh Suhag; Philip Campose; Man Mohan Singh Rai; Bipin Rawat; Sarath Chand; Devraj Anbu; Manoj Mukund Naravane; Satinder Kumar Saini; Chandi Prasad Mohanty; Manoj Pande; B. S. Raju; Jayant Ganpat Nadkarni; Laxminarayan Ramdas; Vijai Singh Shekhawat; Vishnu Bhagwat; Sushil Kumar; Madhvendra Singh; Arun Prakash; Sureesh Mehta; Nirmal Kumar Verma; Devendra Kumar Joshi; Robin K. Dhowan; Sunil Lanba; Karambir Singh; H. Johnson; Suren P. Govil; Vijai Singh Shekhawat; S. K. Chand; Kailash K. Kohli; Sushil Kumar; P. J. Jacob; Madhvendra Singh; John Colin De Silva; Arun Prakash; Yashwant Prasad; Venkat Bharathan; Nirmal Kumar Verma; R. P. Suthan; D. K. Dewan; Robin K. Dhowan; Sunil Lanba; Parasurama Naidu Murugesan; Karambir Singh; Ajit Kumar P; G. Ashok Kumar; Satishkumar Namdeo Ghormade; Sanjay Jasjit Singh; Surinder Mehra; Nirmal Chandra Suri; S. K. Kaul; Satish Sareen; Anil Yashwant Tipnis; Srinivasapuram Krishnaswamy; Shashindra Pal Tyagi; Fali Homi Major; Pradeep Vasant Naik; Norman Anil Kumar Browne; Arup Raha; Birender Singh Dhanoa; R. K. S. Bhadauria; Nirmal Chandra Suri; Palamadai Muthuswamy Ramachandran; Pondicherry Jayarao Jayakumar; Pratap Rao; Satish Sareen; Satish Sareen; Trevor Raymond Joseph Osman; Anil Yashwant Tipnis; Prithvi Singh Brar; Vinod Patney; Srinivasapuram Krishnaswamy; Satish Govind Inamdar; Michael McMahon; Sunil Kumar Malik; Ajit Bhavnani; B. N. Gokhale; Pradeep Vasant Naik; Pranab Kumar Barbora; Norman Anil Kumar Browne; Krishan Kumar Nohwar; Dinesh Chandra Kumaria; Arup Raha; Ravi Kant Sharma; Birender Singh Dhanoa; Shirish Baban Deo; Anil Khosla; R. K. S. Bhadauria; Harjit Singh Arora; Vivek Ram Chaudhari; Sandeep Singh; T. Ananthachary; Prakash Singh; D.K. Arya; Arun Bhagat; A.K. Tandon; E. N. Rammohan; Gurbachan Singh Jagat; Ajay Raj Sharma; Ranjit Shekhar Mooshahary; A.K. Mitra; M.L. Kumawat; Raman Srivastava; U.K. Bansal; Subhash Joshi; D.K. Pathak; K.K. Sharma; Rajni Kant Mishra; V.K. Johri; Surjeet Singh Deswal; Rakesh Asthana; Pankaj Kumar Singh; Sujoy Lal Thaosen; Swaran Singh; Jagjivan Ram; Bansi Lal; Chidambaram Subramaniam; Shankarrao Chavan; K. C. Pant; Sharad Pawar; Pramod Mahajan; Mulayam Singh Yadav; George Fernandes; Jaswant Singh; A. K. Antony; Arun Jaitley; Manohar Parrikar; Nirmala Sitharaman; Narinder Nath Vohra; K. A. Nambiar; T. K. Banerjee; Ajit Kumar; T. R. Prasad; Yogendra Narain; Subir Dutta; Ajay Prasad; Ajai Vikram Singh; Shekhar Dutt; Vijay Singh; Pradeep Kumar; Shashi Kant Sharma; R. K. Mathur; G. Mohan Kumar; Sanjay Mitra; Ajay Kumar; (Bangladesh) Hussain Muhammad Ershad; (Bangladesh) Shahabuddin Ahmed; (Bangladesh) Abdur Rahman Biswas; (Bangladesh) Badruddoza Chowdhury; (Bangladesh) Muhammad Jamiruddin Sircar; (Bangladesh) Iajuddin Ahmed; (Bangladesh) Zillur Rahman; (Bangladesh) Muhammed Abdul Hamid; (Bangladesh) Kazi Zafar Ahmed; (Bangladesh) Muhammad Habibur Rahman; (Bangladesh) Khaleda Zia; (Bangladesh) Latifur Rahman; (Bangladesh) Fazlul Haque; (Bangladesh) Fakhruddin Ahmed; (Bhutan) Jigme Singye Wangchuck; (Bhutan) Jigme Palden Dorji; (Bhutan) Lhendup Dorji; (Bhutan) Jigme Thinley; (Bhutan) Sangay Ngedup; (Bhutan) Yeshey Zimba; (Bhutan) Khandu Wangchuk; (Bhutan) Kinzang Dorji; (Bhutan) Sonam Tobgye; (Bhutan) Tshering Wangchuk; (Bhutan) Lotay Tshering; (Bhutan) Chogyal Dago Rigdzin	Paresh Baruah; Arabinda Rajkhowa (POW); Pradip Gogoi (POW); Anup Chetia (POW); Raju Baruah (POW); Chitrabon Hazarika (POW); Ashanta Baghphukan (MIA); Ramu Mech (POW); Sashadhar Choudhury (POW); Bhimkanta Buragohain (POW); Mithinga Daimary (POW); Pranati Deka (POW); Drishti Rajkhowa (POW); Sabin Boro (POW); Men Sing Takbi (POW); Pradip Terang (POW)	Unknown	Asim Umar †; Osama Mahmood

Strength
1,325,000	700 (2005); 3,500 (2005); 225 (2008)	100	Unknown

Casualties and losses
1992–2014: 1679	1992–2019: 3169		
- Civilian casualties: 4305

The Insurgency in Assam refers to a series of multiple insurgent and separatist movements that had been operated in the Northeast Indian state of Assam. The conflict started in the 1970s following tension between the native indigenous Assamese people and the Indian government over alleged neglect, political, social, cultural, economic issues and increased levels of illegal immigration from Bangladesh. The conflict has resulted in the deaths of 12,000 United Liberation Front of Assam (ULFA) militants and 18,000 others.

Several organisations contribute to the insurgency including the ULFA, the Adivasi National Liberation Army, Karbi Longri N.C. Hills Liberation Front (KLNLF) and the National Democratic Front of Bodoland (NDFB) with ULFA perhaps the largest of these groups, and one of the oldest, having been founded in 1979. The ULFA has attacked Hindi-speaking migrant workers and a movement exists favouring secession from the Republic of India. The alleged neglect and economic, social, cultural and political exploitation by the Indian state are the main reasons behind the growth of this secessionist movement.

The ULFA seeks to establish a sovereign Assam via armed struggle. MULTA (Muslim United Liberation Tigers of Assam), on the other hand, seeks to establish an Islamic state in India via the jihadist struggle of Muslims of both indigenous and migrant origin. The Government of India banned the ULFA in 1990 and classifies it as a terrorist group, while the US State Department lists it under "other groups of concern".

Founded at Rang Ghar, a historic structure dating to the Ahom kingdom on April 7, 1979, the ULFA has been the subject of military operations by the Indian Army since 1990, which have continued into the present. In the past two decades some 30,000 people have died in clashes between the rebels and the government. Assertions of Assamese nationalism are found in Assamese literature and culture. The neglect and exploitation by the Indian state are common refrains in the Assamese-language media with some reports casting the ULFA leaders as saviors.

Internationally acclaimed Assamese novelist Indira Goswami has tried to broker peace for several years between the rebels and the government. In October 2010, Hiren Gohain, a public intellectual, stepped in to expedite the process.

== Notable incidents ==
On 7 June 2007, Dilip Agarwal, an Indian businessman (grocer) and his son, Rajat Agarwal were kidnapped by four suspected Adivasi National Liberation Army (ANLA). In December of the same year, an improvised explosive device planted in a train compartment on its way from Dibrugarh to Delhi, India, blast killing 5 civilians and wounded five more. The ANLA claimed the attack to the media asking for more rights and recognition for the community in the state.

On 23 December 2008, armed militants of the ANLA shot dead the Deputy Manager Gautom Kotoky a senior tea executive in Carramore tea estate (owned by McLeod & Russell Group) along the India-Bhutan border under Harisinga Police Station in Odalguri, Assam. In the next day, a bomb blasts on railway tracks between Khatkhati and Bokajan. The attack left only material damage, and were attributed to the ANLA.

On 10 July 2011, an explosion was registered in the Guwahati-Puri Express train. Four of the train's coaches were derailed and over 100 people were wounded, and the attack caused an unknown amount of property damage to the tracks and train. Authorities said the bomb was placed on the track with wires and other trigger materials, which were found after the bombing. The Adivasi People's Army (APA) claimed responsibility for the attack through an email, and the police suspected that National Democratic Front of Bodoland for the bombing. Suspected APA militants attacked and wound Zakir Hussain, leader in the Assam Minorities Students' Union (AMSU); he held the position of Kamandanga unit assistant secretary. The attack took place in Kokrajhar district, Assam. The APA carried out other similar attacks in train tracks.

In 21 December, the businessman Ratan Saha was kidnapped by members of the Adivasi Cobra Militants of Assam (ACMA) in Kokrajhar, Assam. In response, locals violently protested the kidnapping and demanded that Saha be released in one day. There were no reports of the outcome of the kidnapping.

During 2012, all Adivasi militants including those of Adivasi Cobra Force surrendered. In December of the same year, armed militants of the ANLA kidnapped Gobin Goswami, the headmaster of Kuwoni Lower Primary School in Golaghat, the motive of the abduction and the outcome of the kidnapping is unknown.

Suspect members of the ANLA abducted a grocery store owner and his employee in Majuli area, Sonitpur. The attackers claimed the kidnapping because they had failed to make ransom payments.

On 15 May 2019, twelve people were injured after a grenade exploded in front of a shopping mall in Guwahati. Days later the United Liberation Front of Assam claimed responsibility for the attack, and the authorities arrested the main suspects.

In 2020 and 2021, all Bodo, Karbi, Kuki and Dimasa militants surrendered to the government of India.

In 2022, Gorkha and Tiwa Militants also surrendered.

== Swadhin Axom ==
Swadhin Axom (Independent Assam) is a proposed independent state in Northeast India, primarily inhabited by the Assamese people. The concept of Swadhin Axom stems from the historical and cultural distinctiveness of Assam and the desire of its people for self-determination and sovereignty. The region is currently a part of the Indian state of Assam.

=== History ===
The history of Assam is characterized by a rich cultural heritage and a long-standing struggle for autonomy. The Ahom Kingdom, which ruled Assam for several centuries, is renowned for its administrative prowess and cultural contributions. Many Assamese feel that Assam became Indian, only because of the British. However, with the advent of British colonial rule in the 19th century, Assam's political landscape underwent significant changes.

The Assam Movement, which began in the late 1970s and culminated in the signing of the Assam Accord in 1985, was a pivotal moment in the region's quest for self-determination. Led by organizations like the All Assam Students' Union (AASU) and the All Assam Gana Sangram Parishad (AAGSP), the movement demanded the identification and deportation of illegal immigrants, primarily from Bangladesh, and sought to safeguard the socio-cultural identity of the Assamese people.

=== Leaders of the Swadhin Axom movement ===
Throughout its history, the Swadhin Axom movement has been shaped by visionary leaders who have tirelessly advocated for the rights and aspirations of the Assamese people. Figures like Bishnu Prasad Rabha, a multifaceted artist and social reformer, Tarun Ram Phukan, a prominent political leader, and Prafulla Kumar Mahanta, a key figure in the Assam Movement and former Chief Ministers of Assam including Gopinath Bordoloi, have played crucial roles in advancing the cause of Swadhin Axom.

=== Assam's engagement with India ===
Assam's relationship with India has been characterized by periods of cooperation and conflict. The region's strategic importance, owing to its abundant natural resources and geographical location, has made it a focal point of Indian government policies. However, issues such as resource exploitation, cultural preservation, and political representation have often led to tensions between Assam and the Indian government.

=== Exploitation of resources ===
Assam, known for its rich natural resources, has often faced challenges related to their exploitation and management by the Indian government. The state is endowed with abundant mineral resources, including oil, natural gas, coal, and limestone, making it a significant contributor to India's economy. However, the extraction and utilization of these resources have been a point of contention due to issues of ownership, environmental degradation, and equitable distribution of revenues.

The discovery of oil in Assam in the late 19th century marked the beginning of industrialization in the region. The Assam Oil Company, later known as Oil India Limited, was established in 1889, and the Digboi oilfield became one of the oldest operational oilfields in the world. The exploitation of oil resources in Assam has played a crucial role in India's energy security. However, it has also led to environmental degradation, including oil spills, pollution, and land subsidence.

Natural gas is another significant resource found in Assam, with major reserves located in areas like Sivasagar, Jorhat, and Dibrugarh. The discovery of natural gas fields has led to the establishment of several gas-based industries in the state. However, the extraction and processing of natural gas have raised concerns about its impact on the environment and local communities.

The coal mines in Assam, particularly in the Makum coalfield, have been a source of livelihood for many locals. However, the mining operations have been criticized for their environmental impact, including deforestation, air and water pollution, and land degradation.

The exploitation of resources in Assam has also been a source of political tension. The "Tez dim, tel nadim" (We will give you blood but no oil) slogan, popularized by the All Assam Students' Union (AASU) during the Assam Agitation (1979–1985), highlighted the demand for a fair share of the state's resources and revenue for its development. The slogan reflected the sentiment of many Assamese people who felt marginalized and exploited by the central government's policies.

=== Human rights violations ===
Assam has been plagued by several instances of human rights violations, including extrajudicial killings, rape, and other forms of violence, often attributed to the presence of the Armed Forces (Special Powers) Act (AFSPA) in the region. The Act, in force in Assam and other parts of Northeast India, grants special powers to the armed forces in areas deemed disturbed. While intended to maintain public order, AFSPA has been criticized for enabling impunity and human rights abuses.

==== Extrajudicial killings and secret killings ====
One of the darkest chapters in Assam's recent history is the period of secret killings in the early 2000s. In the aftermath of the Assam Accord (1985), which aimed to resolve the issue of illegal immigration, a series of extrajudicial killings occurred, particularly in the town of Kakopathar. These killings, allegedly carried out by state police and security forces, targeted suspected militants and their families without any judicial process. The victims included women and children, and the killings were often disguised as encounters.

==== Armed Forces (Special Powers) Act (AFSPA) ====
The Armed Forces (Special Powers) Act has been a subject of controversy in Assam, with allegations of its misuse leading to widespread human rights abuses. Under AFSPA, security forces have broad powers, including the authority to shoot to kill, conduct searches without warrants, and arrest individuals without formal procedures. The Act has been criticized by human rights organizations for enabling impunity and creating a climate of fear and distrust among the civilian population.

==== Rape and sexual violence ====
Instances of rape and sexual violence, often involving security forces, have been reported in Assam. These cases highlight the vulnerability of women in conflict-affected areas and the challenges they face in seeking justice. One such case involved the rape of a 12-year-old girl by an army jawan in Assam's Baksa district in 2015. Despite the victim's family filing a complaint, no action was taken against the accused, raising concerns about impunity and lack of accountability.

==== Lack of accountability ====
One of the major issues in addressing human rights violations in Assam has been the lack of accountability and the failure to bring perpetrators to justice. Cases of extrajudicial killings, rape, and other forms of violence often go unpunished, leading to a sense of impunity among security forces and other perpetrators.

=== Birth of ULFA ===
The United Liberation Front of Assam (ULFA) was formed on 7 April 1979, with the aim of establishing an independent sovereign Assam through armed struggle. The group emerged in response to the socio-political and economic grievances of the Assamese people, particularly regarding illegal immigration from Bangladesh, perceived as a threat to the Assamese identity and culture.

==== Background ====
ULFA was founded by six Assamese youths, including Paresh Baruah, who became its military chief. The group gained traction by tapping into the growing resentment against the perceived neglect and exploitation of Assam by the Indian government. The Assam Accord of 1985, which sought to address these grievances, failed to satisfy ULFA's demand for independence, leading to further escalation of the conflict.

==== Armed struggle ====
ULFA began its armed struggle against the Indian state, targeting security forces, government officials, and infrastructure. The group employed guerrilla tactics and bombings to further its cause, leading to a cycle of violence and counter-violence in Assam.

==== Impact ====
The emergence of ULFA had a profound impact on Assam's socio-political landscape. The group's activities disrupted normal life in the state, leading to economic losses and a sense of insecurity among the populace. The Indian government's response, including the imposition of AFSPA, further exacerbated tensions and human rights abuses in the region.

==== International connections ====
ULFA sought support from various quarters, including countries like China, which were sympathetic to its cause. The group also forged links with other separatist movements in the region, aiming to garner support for its struggle for independence. ULFA is also quite close with Kachin Independence Army of Myanmar, maintaining close tie in the Federal Wesean Alliance.

=== Present day ===
The demand for Swadhin Axom remains a significant issue in Assam's political discourse. While some advocate for greater autonomy within the Indian federal structure, others continue to push for complete independence. The region's complex demographic dynamics, marked by ethnic diversity and historical grievances, contribute to the nuanced nature of the debate surrounding Swadhin Axom.

However, in recent years, there have been discussions about the formation of a federal Wesean state that would encompass Swadhin Axom as one of its constituent regions. This proposal envisions a political entity that would bring together various ethnic groups in the region, including the Assamese, in a federal arrangement that respects their distinct identities and aspirations.

== See also ==
- Operation All Clear
- 2008 Assam bombings
- Bhimajuli Massacre
- 2009 Guwahati bombings
- 2009 Assam serial blasts
- Insurgency in North-East India
- Separatist movements of India
