= Dwipamani Kalita =

- Born: Jabjabkuchi, Nalbari, Assam
- Other names: Sima Sonowal, Moina
- Occupations: Politician, Business Woman, Social worker,
- Parent: late Karuna kalita
- Status: Surrendered
- Criminal charge: Terrorism

Dwipamani Kalita (Assamese: দ্বীপামণি কলিতা) (aliases Sima Sonowal Sima Sonowal, Moina) is the first ULFA hit-woman of the outfit. She was responsible for all the mortar attacks executed during 2002–2003 in Assam. She joined the outfit in 1998. As she told to police, though she was an expert in mortar shelling, she was used to RPGs. Her accomplices were Dilip Roy and Pranoy Roy who formed a three-member elite group.

== Family background ==
Dwipamani hails from Jabjabkuchi village under Ghagrapar PS in Nalbari. Her father Karuna Kalita died while she was an infant forcing her to live with her step-mother. According to DGP Harekrishna Deka, she was a victim of social ostracism and trauma which made a militant out of her. She was separated from her mother at a very young age and saw her father killed by the villagers. Her elder brother was also killed in an accident. Being unable to bear the atrocities of her step-mother she joined the outfit in 1998 through one Minati Kalita, and ULFA activist Manoj Goswami of Nalbari.

== Education ==
Dwipamani cleared her HSLC and HS examinations. She passed the HSLC examination in 1996. She was said to be deprived of any support from her family and friends.

== Training ==
Dwipamani was exclusively trained in Misnupur, Bangladesh in the Enigma ‘B’ camp for four months where she met Paresh Barua for the first time. After the completion of her training, she was taken to an official firing range, blindfolded by the ULFA’s foreign associates. Then she was inducted into the outfit’s Enigma Group which is responsible for carrying out violent strikes.

== Mission ==
After having completed her training, she was despatched to Guwahati. She was told to lead a normal life to deflect any suspicion even as she carried out the attacks. She even reportedly purchased a plot and constructed a house on the outskirts of Guwahati. ‘‘Unlike the other ULFA cadre, she travelled by public transport and did not carry any cellphone or call up the leadership from Guwahati after she was sent out on these missions. Her most potent weapon was her complete anonymity and secrecy,’’ IGP Khagen Sharma said. She reportedly travelled with two-inch-long mortars in city buses.

=== Major Attacks ===
The operations were masterminded in Bangladesh by C-in-C Paresh Baruah, deputy C-in-C Raju Baruah, Drishti Rajkhowa and Ramu Gogoi and the trio were assigned for the job.

- On 27 October 2002, she fired a mortar which landed and exploded in the Dispur Capital residential complex. Two government and a private vehicle were damaged, however, no one was injured. The mortar was fired from behind the Dispur Law College.
- On 22 December 2002, she tried to blow up the CRPF transit camp in the city but failed.
- On 25 December 2002, she fired six mortars in quick succession near Ambari. 21 persons sustained splinter injuries, of which three later died.

The other two mortar attacks, at Borjhar and Palashbari, were carried out by her accomplice Pranoy Roy.

== Surrender ==
On Sunday, 20 April 2003, Dwipamani surrendered before DGP Harekrishna Deka and IGP (Special Branch) Khagen Sharma. She was only 20 at the time of surrender. She deposited an AK-56 and three rocket-propelled grenades during her formal surrender to the DGP. IGP Sharma said that Dwipamani was in touch with him over telephone for three months or so. After accomplishing a mission she even started calling up IGP Sharma over phone and taunted him for having failed to catch the culprits. As she admits before the reporters IGP Sharma gradually started talking her out of the destructive life she was leading which made her realize that she had only been used as a machine by the ULFA. She said at the press conference that she was not aware of the ideology of the ULFA and only joined the outfit due to family problems.

== Rehabilitation ==
Dwipamani was on "specialised rehabilitation" and in order to return her to a normal life, the police top brass had taken special care of her. "The police would rehabilitate her in a ‘‘non-conventional way’’ by supporting her education and giving whatever other support she required to settle down in life, given her good academic record." Said DGP Harekrishna Deka. Now Dwipamani is the owner of two popular restaurants in Guwahati — both specialising in Assamese dishes. She was supported by the Assam Police to start the restaurants under a special rehabilitation package for surrendered rebels.

== See also ==
- List of top leaders of ULFA
- Sanjukta Mukti Fouj
