= 2003 South Bhutan clashes =

Series of clashes in South Bhutan

August 2003 South Bhutan Clashes
- Part of Insurgency in Northeast India, Southern Bhutan Insurgency
Date	3 August 2003 – 10 August 2003
Location	Southern Bhutan: Samdrup Jongkhar District
Result	Inconclusive: The Bhutanese government would begin an operation against ULFA and allies in Southern Bhutan 4 months later

Belligerents
ULFA; Supported by: NDFB; KLO; NSCN; ATTF; BLTF; MULTA	Unidentified Gunmen: Indian Security Forces (alleged by ULFA); SULFA (alleged by ULFA); Kingdom of Bhutan (alleged); Royal Bhutan Army; Royal Bhutan Police

Commanders and leaders
Arabinda Rajkhowa; Bhimkanta Buragohain; Mithinga Daimary; Rahul Datta	Commander Tenzing " T.T " Wangchuk; Commander Adon " P " Lepcha; Commander Jigmed Tshering Bhutia †: Sgt. Khushal Kritin Pokhrel †; Sgt. Karma " Egg " Gyurme (executed)

Strength
Unknown	40–67+

Casualties and losses
7–9+ killed At least 5 wounded	At least 4 killed

The August 2003 South Bhutan Clashes were a series of clashes between ULFA militants and unidentified gunmen in Southern Bhutan. The clashes left at least 11 people dead and dozens injured. While the incidents were scarcely reported at the time, many believe they were the first instances of Bhutanese strikes against ULFA militants in the country's south, and tensions between ULFA, allied Assamese separatist groups, and Bhutan would lead to a full-fledged conflict breaking out just four months later.

== Background ==
In 1990, India launched Operations Rhino and Bajrang against Assam separatist groups, which caused the militants to relocate their camps to Bhutan. In the 1990s, ULFA and NDFB, two groups targeted by the Indian operations, allegedly assisted the government of Bhutan in expelling the ethnic Lhotshampa population and occupied the abandoned land.

In 1996, Bhutan discovered a large number of camps on its southern border with India, which were set up by various separatist movements including ULFA, NDFB, BLTF, and KLO. These camps were used to train cadres and store equipment while allowing militants to launch attacks into Indian territory.

India exerted diplomatic pressure on Bhutan and offered support in removing rebel organizations from its soil. Bhutan initially pursued a peaceful solution and opened dialogue with militant groups in 1998. ULFA agreed to close down four of its camps in June 2001, but the Bhutanese government soon discovered that the camps had merely been relocated.

Furthermore, ULFA allegedly helped to create several militant groups in southern Bhutan with the help of Nepali Maoists, KLO, and the NDFB, including the BTF and BGLF. This caused Bhutan to become even more concerned and further justified an anti-Assamese separatist operation. Bhutanese parliamentarians began to propose raising the number of Bhutanese militia and introducing conscription, motions which were soon dismissed.

== Clashes ==
=== August 3–4 ===
Starting in either August 3 or 4th (reports are unclear), an attack was launched by over 15 unidentified gunmen on a base of the Assamese separatist group, United Liberation Front of Asom (ULFA), in Kinzo, leaving two ULFA members dead. Sometime later on 4 August, between 10 and 12 unidentified gunmen attacked another ULFA hideout in Babang, resulting in the deaths of four gunmen and 1-3 ULFA fighters. Both the Samdrup Jongkhar district officials and the ULFA's publicity department confirmed the attacks.

=== August 10 ===
According to a media report from August 13, a group of approximately 40 unidentified gunmen attacked a hideout belonging to the United Liberation Front of Asom (ULFA) in Tiluka, Bhutan on August 10. The assault resulted in the death of four ULFA cadres and left five others injured, with casualties amongst the unidentified gunmen unknown. Indian authorities confirmed the attack shortly after.

== Identity of the Attackers ==
The attacks sparked controversy over the identities of the armed groups involved in the attacks. ULFA blamed Indian security agencies and surrendered ULFA (SULFA) members for the attacks on their hideouts, believing that the attacks were organized in India. However, Indian officials attributed the violence to infighting within various ULFA factions. Other reports suggested that the attackers could be part of a special force raised by the Bhutanese army under Indian guidance, or even local vigilante groups.

== Aftermath ==
The spate of attacks on ULFA hideouts in southern Bhutan and Bhutanese government reactions to it demonstrated the state of the deterioration of Bhutanese-ULFA relations. While no known clashes occurred after August 10, several reports indicate that violence may have continued throughout the following months. On December 15, 2003, Bhutan would launch a campaign to expel ULFA and other allied Assamese separatist groups from Southern Bhutan, with Indian assistance.
