= Kaveri Kachari =

Indian terrorist

Kaberi Kachari Rajkonwar
- Spouse: Arabinda Rajkhowa
- Children: K.B. Rajkonwar (daughter), Godadhar (son)

Kaberi Kachari is the head of the women's wing of the banned outfit ULFA. She is also the wife of Arabinda Rajkhowa, the chairman of the outfit. She was known for her poetic excellence from her college days.

== Personal life ==
In the late 80s, when she was a student at the Gauhati University, she married Arabinda Rajkhowa. They had to spend the initial days of their marriage in the jungles of Assam and Bhutan. They have two children: Khamseng Rajkumari (daughter) and Gadadhar (son).

== Arrest ==
She, along with her husband Rajkhowa, deputy C-in-C Raju Baruah and Rajkhowa's bodyguard Raja Bora, was said to have surrendered to the BSF on 4 Dec 2009 morning near the Indo-Bangladesh border in Meghalaya. She was not produced in court for no cases were pending there against her. She and the other women along with their minors are housed in the 4th Assam Police Battalion's guesthouse in Guwahati.

== Family custody ==
Rajkhowa's elder brother Ajay Rajkonwar reportedly that he wanted to take custody of his brother's family so that their 97-year-old mother could meet them. "We are ready to take custody of Kaveri and the two children -- 13-year-old daughter and five-year old son -- and take them to our mother at Lakwa in Sibsagar. If Kaveri wants to stay back for the outfit's organisational work, we have nothing to say," he said to reporters.

== See also ==
- List of top leaders of ULFA
- Sanjukta Mukti Fouj
- Enigma Group
