= Tapan Baruah =

ULFA rebel (1970–2002)

- Born: Madan Das; 16 February 1970; Nalbari, Assam, India
- Died: 20 May 2002 (aged 32); Tinsukia, India
- Other name: Jayanta Handique

Tapan Baruah (Assamese: তপন বৰুৱা) (borne: Madan Das) was the first Commander of 28th Battalion of ULFA. Killed on 20 May 2002, Tapan Baruah was widely known as a skilled hardcore militant in guerrilla warfare in the outlawed United Liberation Front of Asom.

According to conflict analysts Tapan Baruah was trained in Kachin and Afghanistan.

Baruah was also ULFA's Action Group Commander.

== Biography ==
Born on 16 February 1972, Madan Das joined the ULFA in 1988 while studying at Nalbari College. He studied at the Debiram Pathsala High School in Nalbari district, and was 1986 HSLC pass out of the school. Tapan Baruah attended Nalbari College for his pre-university course but didn't attend the exam and joined the ULFA. After joining ULFA, he became a close aide of the outfit's Commander-in-Chief Paresh Baruah. Tapan Baruah was soon promoted as one of the dreaded commanders. In 1998, he was assigned as the commander of the 28th Battalion of the outfit. With his politeness Tapan was popular in his locality before he joined the outfit.

== Major assassination ==
Tapan Baruah and Drishti Rajkhowa are believed in involvement in the bombing & killing of Assam Minister Nagen Sharma in 2000.

In 2001, the then Assam's Director-general of police Harekrishna Deka, said in an interview that the killings in upper Assam had a clear command of Tapan Baruah, while the killings in lower Assam were commanded by Raju Baruah.

== Death ==
On 20 May 2002, Tapan Baruah was surrounded in Talpathar Majhgaon of Kakopathar by hundreds of Indian Army personnel following an intelligence input. At that time, approx morning 11 AM, he was on his morning meal in the house of Rebati Dhadumia, while he was surrounded without his knowing. While army personnel's position was known to him, he tried to flee away but it was too late. He tried to flee out running more than 1 km, but was wounded with bullets shots fired by dozens of Army. Within half an hour, he collapsed and was declared dead. Some sources alleged that Tapan Baruah was shot in cold blood.

According to Assam police, the death of Tapan Baruah was a massive success for the security forces.

Soon after the killing of Tapan Baruah, several Assamese newspapers published news and reports glorifying Tapan Baruah. Some newspaper added citation of the ULFA's Operation Commander Raju Baruah and Foreign Secretary Shashadhar Choudhury's statement as follows:

A huge crowd gathered in the native village of the slain ULFA leader to pay respect to the departed soul. He has been underground for last 15 years and was never arrested either by the police or the Army. Well behaved, Tapan Barua was everyone's favourite in the locality before he joined the organisation... For around four years he toured different countries receiving the necessary training. Trained in Myanmar, Kachin, Bhutan, and Afghanistan, he was asked to take over as the district operation commander. Then he was made the Commander of the 7th battalion stationed in Bhutan. Before being killed Barua was the operation commander of Upper Assam and lieutenant commanding officer of the 28th battalion of the organisation.

== See also ==
- List of top leaders of ULFA
- Raju Baruah
- 28th Battalion (ULFA)
- Drishti Rajkhowa
