= Abhizeet Asom =

British executive

- Born: Mukul Hazarika
- Other name: Abhizeet Asom
- Citizenship: British
- Organization: ULFA (I)
- Known for: Chairperson of the ULFA (I)
- Movement: Sovereignty of Asom
- Opponent: Indian State

Abhizeet Bormon commonly known by his alias Abhizeet Asom (Assamese: অভিজিত অসম), is the chairperson of the United Liberation Front of Assam (Independent).

== Role as ULFA leader ==
In the 1990s, he chaperoned the organisation's leaders in a number of United Nations' (UN) convocations at Geneva. He is believed to be the brain behind the undeterred conference at the UN subsequent to the Bhutan Army's Operation All Clear, which was being strongly supported by the government of India.

Asom had been working as the acting chairman of the United Liberation Front of Assam since Arabinda Rajkhowa's decision to hold talks with the government of India, and was later designated as the chairperson of the organisation on 8 August 2012, following the expulsion of Rajkhowa from all the assigned ranks of the ULFA by the organisation. The ULFA stated that Rajkhowa was ousted because of his unresponsive behaviour regarding the three-month ultimatum given by the organisation on 29 April 2012. Earlier, Paresh Baruah, who is leading the "anti-talk faction" of the ULFA, had issued three months deadline to the "pro-talk faction" to "break talks with the government and return to the outfit", depicting the series of discussions held between the "pro-talk faction" of the ULFA and the government of India as "a sell-out by Ulfa chairman Arabinda Rajkhowa and other leaders." The "anti-talk faction" said:

The ULFA as a whole is very humbly requesting our Chairman to return to lead the organisation breaking free of Indian control within three months of issuance of this call. Otherwise, the vacant Chair will have to be filled by the constitutional process empowered to the office bearers and members of the unbound (anti-talk faction) ULFA at the end of the above deadline.

Baruah says that the "demand for [Assam's] sovereignty does not mean secession" but disapproves parleying with the Indian government unless the agenda of sovereignty for Assam is addressed. But, Rajkhowa claims that the newly formed central committee of the ULFA is not in accordance with the organisation's constitution and sees himself as the organisation's chairperson, and the Indian government also view the "Rajkhowa faction" as the organisation's sole representative. In November 2012, Dainik Jagran described Asom as the chairperson of the "anti-talk faction" of the organisation. Asom, however, had said:

The honourable chairman of Ulfa, along with the senior office-bearers of the central committee under Indian custody, is having a dialogue with the Indian establishment to achieve an honourable solution to the issue raised by Ulfa. The restoration of sovereign Assam is the honourable solution and there cannot be any other alternative. Hence, the free members of the Ulfa decided to reorganize the central committee to enable us to continue with the struggle to its avowed conclusion.

Asom maintains that the ULFA will not back down from the ambition of achieving sovereignty for Assam, and says that the people still have confidence in the organisation by pointing towards the recruitment in the ULFA.

Before being instated as the acting chairperson of the ULFA, his identity was known only to Anup Chetia, Arabinda Rajkhowa, and Paresh Baruah. And, his candidature for the role of the acting chairperson of the organisation left the government of India, the Indian Army, and the news media in a state of bewilderment. In May 2013, NE TV and News Time Assam aired a video of the London based medical practitioner Mukul Hazarika, in which he can be seen addressing an assemblage at Geneva held on the subject of "human rights", speaking on "the armed conflict in the NE [north-eastern India] region". The news channels reported that the person in the video is none other than Asom, however, the Additional Director General of Police Khagen Sarma said that while they are aware that Hazarika had maintained links with the ULFA leaders, they are not sure yet that whether he and Asom is the same individual. Hazarika is also known in the U.K. for addressing the subject of "human rights", and bringing the demand of Assam's sovereignty to the fore.

Asom also issued a statement to the press on the demise of Kishenji. He said that Kishenji was a person "who has given his life in pursuit of the betterment of the marginalised bottom strata of Indian citizenry."

== On negotiations with Indian government ==
Asom, as the chairperson of the ULFA, has put condiciones sine quibus non before the government of India if it is willing to initiate a dialogue with the organisation, which are:

1. "that the negotiations will be held on third country soil."
2. "that the talks will be under the auspices of the United Nations."
3. "and that these discussions with the government of India must include their demand for sovereignty."

However, he also says that the prime objective of the ULFA is certainly not the secession of Assam from India, but the sovereignty of Assam. In Asom's words:

....we don't expect Assam to break away. We expect India to restore Assam's historical independent status and gracefully return our sovereignty, which was stolen from us. And be a friendly next door. On that basis, we will then negotiate other things without any qualms. As we said we don't want to be enemies of the state of India. We can negotiate with India in the area of economics, development and progress. And the progress of India will be an example to the people of Assam to march ahead and try to match the progress of India. So that Assam can also do better.

== On alleged links with foreign intelligence agencies ==
Asom rebutes the allegation that the ULFA have ties with the Directorate General of Forces Intelligence or the Inter-Services Intelligence, but added they are "acutely aware of who is what. For the cause of Assam's sovereignty we [ULFA's members] can consider using them advantageously.... But, we cannot allow them to use us."

The intelligence agencies of India accuse the ULFA of having inordinate alliance with China, but the organisation as well as the Chinese Foreign Ministry deny the allegation.

== Other activities and interests ==
Asom has shown interest towards wildlife conservation. He has alleged that the Department of Environment and Forests, Government of Assam is involved in the killings of Rhinos for their horns, and appreciated the NGO Nature's Beacon for publicly raising the issue of the death of a Rhino on 25 March 2012, who died as a result of the assault by people, after the animal was let off openly the Department of Environment and Forests after cutting its horns. He suggested that the department should consider taking assistance from the eminent wildlife conservationists like John Hume. He further said:

....a transparent methodology of storing Rhino horns should be adopted and the revenue earned from it legally should be used for conservation efforts of the fauna in Assam.

== See also ==
- List of top leaders of ULFA
- People's Consultative Group
- Sanjukta Mukti Fouj
