= Jibon Moran =

ULFA-I functionary who served as the finance secretary of the proscribed outfit

- Died: 27 April 2022
- Military career
- Allegiance: ULFA
- Rank: Major general
- Service number: 1984-2021
- Unit: 28th Battalion
- Conflicts: Operation Bajrang; Operation All Clear

Jibon Moran alias Jibon Asom was a former high-ranking ULFA-I functionary who served as the finance secretary of the proscribed outfit. He was also a member of the outfit's central executive committee. Moran joined the organization in 1984, went to Kachin for his initial training, and exited in 2021 due to his deteriorating health, serving for nearly 4 decades. Moran hailed from Uban village in Kakopathar, Tinsukia.

He died at the age of 66 on April 27, 2022, in Guwahati Apollo Hospital, after a prolonged illness. Issuing a press statement on his death, ULFA-I paid tributes to him.

== See also ==
- List of top leaders of ULFA
- Sanjukta Mukti Fouj
- ULFA
- Paresh Baruah
