= Robin Handique =

ULFA rebel

- Born: Assam
- Died: 31 August 2005
- Status: Died in custody
- Criminal charges: None as dead

Robin Handique (Assamese:ৰবীন সন্দিকৈ) was a founding member of the banned terrorist outfit ULFA in Assam. He was an arms and explosive expert who later became a chief advisor of the outfit along with Bhimkanta Buragohain. He was in charge of five ULFA camps in Myanmar and also its Central Assam Commander for several years.

== Arrest ==
He was captured along with top ULFA leaders including Buragohain, Amulya Chandra Rai alias Amarjeet Gogoi and Bolin Das alias Kamal Kachari during Operation All Clear by the Royal Bhutan Army in December 2003. He was later handed over to the Indian authorities in Assam.

== Death and its aftermath ==
Handique died of kidney failure on 31 August 2005 in a Tezpur hospital while in jail custody. But the ULFA alleged that Handique's death was due to slow poisoning by the authorities. Arabinda Rajkhowa, the chairman of the outfit said that Handique had various ailments but was denied proper medical facilities. The outfit also called a 12-hour bandh (general strike) in Assam on 8 September.

The Assam Human Rights Commission (AHRC) directed the Sonitpur District Magistrate to get the matter inquired into by a senior magistrate.

== See also ==
- List of top leaders of ULFA
- Sanjukta Mukti Fouj
- 28th Battalion (ULFA)
