= Raja Bora =

Indian terrorist

- Born: Assam
- Other name: Polash Phukan
- Status: Arrested/Imprisoned
- Criminal charges: Terrorism

Raja Bora (Assamese: ৰাজা বৰা), alias Polash Phukan, was the personal bodyguard of Arabinda Rajkhowa, the chairman of United Liberation Front of Assam, a revolutionary rebel organisation operating in the Indian state of Assam.

== Arrest ==
On 4 December 2009, Bora, with the group's chairman Arabinda Rajkhowa and eight others, surrendered before the Indian authority near the Indo-Bangladesh border in Meghalaya. They were said to be taken into custody by the Border Security Force the moment they crossed the border near Dawki in Meghalaya's East Khasi Hills.

== Charges ==
Apart from the charge of waging war against India, a pending murder case has been registered against him with Joipur police station. He was sought in the murder of Cheniram Borah, a resident of Barhoni Gaon near Nahorkatiya in 2005.

== See also ==
- List of top leaders of ULFA
- Sanjukta Mukti Fouj
- Enigma Group
- 28th Battalion (ULFA)
