= Ramu Mech =

ULFA rebel

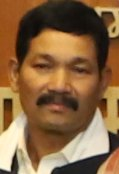
- Born: Assam
- Other names: Prabin Konwar, Sailen Baruah
- Status: On parole
- Criminal charges: Terrorism

Ramu Mech (Assamese: ৰামু মেচ) aliases Prabin Konwar and Sailen Baruah, is a Central Executive Committee member of the banned outfit ULFA in Assam. He used to be the chief of the outfit's East Zone and also a trusted lieutenant of Arabinda Rajkhowa, the outfit's chairman. He was elevated to the rank of deputy C-in-C of the outfit's armed wing.

== Arrest ==
In October 2002, he, with his bodyguard, was arrested by Sibsagar Police from Aditya Diagnostic Centre, Dibrugarh, where he was secretly undergoing treatment. Now Mech is on parole.

== Charges ==
Cases pending against him are:

Police Stations	Charges
Simaluguri,(Sivasagar) PS	Under Sec 147, 148, 149, 120(B), 121, 302, 307, 326 of IPC
Special Branch of Assam Police	Under sec 120(B), 121, 121(A), 122, read with sec 10/13 of the Unlawful Activities (Prevention) Act

== See also ==
- ULFA
- Sanjukta Mukti Fouj
- People's Consultative Group
- List of top leaders of ULFA
