= Kakopathar massacre =

2006 event in Assam, India

- Location: Kakopathar, Tinsukia district, Assam
- Date: 10 February 2006; 20 years ago
- Target: Civilians
- Attack type: Massacre
- Deaths: 10
- Perpetrator: Indian Army

Kakopathar killings or the Kakopathar massacre took place in Assam during 2006 when the Indian Army opened fire at peaceful protesters at Kakopathar in Assam, killing at least 10 people.

On 10 February 2006, nine people were killed by bullets of the armed forces and Assam Police at Kakopather. Six of them were protesters and two were residents of Kakopather hit by stray bullets from the indiscriminate firing. The protesters were among the thousands of residents that poured out from villages in and around Kakopather and took to the streets demanding justice for the custodial death of Ajit Mahanta, a 23-year-old resident of Dirak Gohain gaon in Kakopather.

Ajit Mahanta was picked up by personnel of the 13th Gorkha Regiment of the Indian Army stationed in the area. The incident took place on 4 February. At about six in the evening, seven people came to Mahanta's bamboo and thatched house where he lived with his mother, wife and two children. Five of the people were in uniform and the other two wore civilian clothes. They asked for Mahanta and his wife replied that he had gone to a neighbour's. The military personnel went searching for him and picked him up from the way. The Army later took his body to the Assam Medical College claiming that he died in a fall. This happened on 6 February.

Following the incident on 7 February, the residents of the area and other neighbouring villages came out in protest. Thousands of people blocked National Highway 52 near Soonjan village in protest against the killing. They demanded the guilty to be punished at once. However, no action was taken against the military personnel responsible for the death of Mahanta. This led to the increase in protests and number of protesters. People started protesting at various other places like Chabua, Pengeri and Doomdooma. However, the administration turned a blind eye to the situation and did not take the case seriously even after increasing protests.

On 10 February, people gathered at Dirak Chariali and started marching towards Kakopather. Police tried to stop them, but the protesters edged on. Then the police started firing tear shells and bullets in the air. When the protesters showed no signs of fear, the police and armed forces started indiscriminate firing resulting in the death of nine people.

Kakopathar and many areas of rural Upper Assam and Lower Assam are supposedly ULFA strongholds and the common people have faced army atrocities during counter-insurgency operations since the Assamese Separatist Movement started in 1979. Arabinda Rajkhowa, the chairman of United Liberation Front of Asom, compared the 2006 massacre with the Jallianwala Bagh massacre.

A strong wave or pro-ULFA sentiment spread across Assam after this incident and many parts of upper Assam saw spontaneous protests of people. The popular sentiments gave strength to a considerably weakened ULFA in Assam.

== See also ==
- Assam Conflict
- Nellie massacre
- Bhimajuli Massacre
- Assamese nationalism
- Assam Agitation
