= Chitrabon Hazarika =

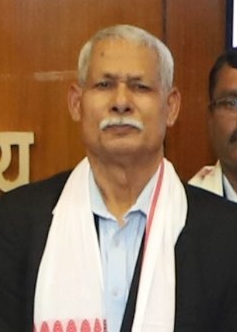
- Hazarika in 2023
- Born: Jakhalabandha, Nagaon, Assam
- Spouse: Pranati Deka
- Status: Arrested
- Criminal charges: Waging war against India, Possessing illegal arms and cash.

Chitrabon Hazarika (Assamese: চিত্ৰবন হাজৰিকা) is the Finance Secretary of the banned group ULFA, Assam. He has also been holding the additional charge of general secretary since Anup Chetia’s arrest in 1997. A commerce graduate he hails from Jakhalabandha in Nagaon district of Assam. He is married to Pranati Deka, the arrested Cultural Secretary of the group.

== Arrest ==
On Sunday night, 1 November 2009, unidentified gunmen took away Hazarika, along with the group’s foreign secretary Sashadhar Choudhury, from a house in sector 3 of Uttara in Dhaka. Later they were pushed back to the Indo-Bangladesh border where they were detained by BSF in Tripura while trying to infiltrate on the night of 4 November. They were handed over to Assam Police on 6 November by the BSF. But according to the Assam Police, the leaders surrendered before BSF in Tripura fleeing the crackdown against them in Bangladesh.

On Saturday, 7 November 2009, the Special Operation Unit of the Assam police produced Choudhury and Hazarika before the court of Chief Judicial Magistrate, Kamrup (Metropolitan).

== Reaction ==
On 9 November 2009 ULFA called for a 12-hour Assam bandh (general strike) from 6 am demanding their unconditional release. ULFA chairman Arabinda Rajkhowa, in a statement issued through e-mail, described the two leaders' arrest as a "ploy to sabotage the process of finding a political solution to the problem and destroy ULFA militarily."

== See also ==
- List of top leaders of ULFA
- Sanjukta Mukti Fouj
- People's Consultative Group
