= Bhomita Talukdar =

Indian terrorist

- Born: Assam
- Other name: Deepali
- Spouse: Arun Mahanta
- Status: Arrested
- Criminal charges: Terrorism

Bhomita Talukdar (Assamese: ভমিতা তালুকদাৰ), alias Deepali, was the organisational secretary of the women's wing of ULFA and wife of Arun Mahanta, a hardcore ULFA militant of Barpeta. She was arrested on 7 August 2003, by the troops of Red Horns Division from the village Jangrinpara located in general area Fatimabad of Barpeta. She operated as a 'terrorist' and 'subversive' throughout southern Assam, according to the Indian authorities.

== See also ==
- List of top leaders of ULFA
- Sanjukta Mukti Fouj
- Enigma Group
