= Heerak Jyoti Mahanta =

Assamese nationalist (1961–1991)

- Born: 6 September 1961; Nalbari, Assam, India
- Died: 31 December 1991 (aged 30); Guwahati, Assam, India
- Cause of death: Killed by Assam Police & Indian Army
- Burial place: Bhootnath Cremation Ground; 26.1693348°N 91.7225207°E
- Other names: Jayanta Medhi; Naren Deka
- Education: Gauhati University
- Parents: Ratnapati Mahanta (father); Bimala Mahanta (mother)

Heerak Jyoti Mahanta, also spelled as Hirakjyoti Mahanta was the first deputy commander-in-chief of armed rebel group ULFA in Assam. He was killed on the eve of 31 December 1991.

He was one of the hardcore cadres of the ULFA. He strongly opposed any kind of surrendering and lateral talk with the Indian government, and it never happened within the outfit until his death. After his death, though, in 1992, a large section of second-rung leaders and members surrendered to government authorities.

== Early life and education ==
Mahanta was a student of Guwahati's Cotton Collegiate Government High School, and obtained a Bachelor of Science in physics from Gauhati University.

== Militancy life ==
Mahanta completed his militancy training in Kachin, Myanmar with ULFA commander-in-chief Paresh Baruah, and they returned to Assam in 1984. Mahanta was regarded as a notably brave and strong youth militant leader in the outfit.

== Conspiracy ==
In the late 1980s, Mahanta became very powerful. He openly criticized the policies of the central leadership of ULFA, and posed a potential threat to Paresh Baruah. Subsequently, under the direction of Paresh Baruah, his movement was passed on to the Assam Police, which ultimately led to his death.

== Death ==
On 31 December 1991, military intelligence received a tip-off about Mahanta's hideout in Guwahati. A huge team of the army moved quickly, nabbing one of Mahanta's security guards, Moon Ali, from a hotel in Guwahati's Fancy Bazaar. Moon Ali's detention led the army to the house of Nripen Baruah in the Geetanagar area, where Mahanta and his two other security guards were taking shelter. The army encircled the house; the three men were unable to escape from the gherao and all were detained.

Mahanta was taken to the Geetanagar police station, where he was shot and killed. Though his death occurred in custody in the police station, most of the newspapers argue that an uncompromising Mahanta was killed by Army as he refused to relent even after being encircled.

Heerak Jyoti Mahanta's death created massive outrage throughout Assam, amongst both the outfit and civilians. Thousands of villagers of his hometown of the Nalbari district gathered where ULFA militants offered the last honor to their leader. The funeral processions served as a law and order challenge to the state government.

== See also ==
- List of top leaders of ULFA
- Sanjukta Mukti Fouj
