= Secret Killings of Assam =

Secret killings of Assam: The Horror Tales from the Land of Red River and Blue Hills
- Author: Mrinal Talukdar; Utpal Borpujari; Kaushik Deka
- Language: English
- Subject: Assassination; Insurgency
- Publisher: Nanda Talukdar Foundation, Guwahati, Assam
- Publication date: January 2009
- Publication place: Assam, India
- Media type: Print (Paperback)
- Pages: 202
- ISBN: 81-89479-51-2

Secret killings of Assam: The Horror Tales from the Land of Red River and Blue Hills is a compilation of reports on secret-killings of family members of ULFA by active connivance of Indian security forces between 1998 and 2001. It is based on reports of an enquiry commission formed for it as well as numerous news reports published at that time. It is written by three veteran journalists - Mrinal Talukdar, Utpal Borpujari and Kaushik Deka who also used to write on that issue when it was on peak time. The book with 202 pages was published by Nanda Talukdar Foundation in January 2009.

According to Borpujari, one of the writers, they do not have any intention to pinpoint the culprits through the book. "The aim of this book is not to start the blame game. But outside Assam, hardly anyone knows about this. Our aim therefore is to tell the world that such a horrific crime took place in Assam between 1998 and 2001," he said.

== See also ==
- Secret-killings of Assam
