= Rajen Sharma =

ULFA rebel (killed 1989)

Rajen Sharma, commonly known as Uddipta Hazarika, (Note: The name is spelled in several books and journals as Udipta Hazarika, Rajen Sarma, Rajen Sarmah etc.) was the first publicity secretary of the militant organisation United Liberation Front of Asom (ULFA). Popular for his poem Mor Rakta Borna Protigya (Assamese: মোৰ ৰক্তবৰ্ণ প্ৰতিজ্ঞা, English: My bloody promise), Sharma was killed on 8 October 1989.

Sharma was the first martyr of the ULFA, as the organisation was banned by the government of India a year after his death. In memory of Sharma, journalist Parag Kumar Das dedicated his book Changlot Fenla, citing Uddipta alias Rajen Sharma as a martyr and a National Hero.

== Early life ==
Sharma was born to a family of teachers and had a good academic background. After passing HSLC examination, he studied at Cotton College in Guwahati. He didn't complete his studies and joined the militant outfit ULFA.

== Militancy life and death ==
Sharma joined the ULFA in the early 1980s and became the first publicity secretary of the organisation. Sharma adopted the organisational name Uddipta Hazarika. As the ULFA's ideologue, several motivated youths joined the organisation under the leadership of Uddipta Hazarika. As the publicity secretary of the ULFA, he was very vocal with his writings in newspapers and pamphlets. Sharma published all pamphlets and the outfit's mouthpiece "Swadhinata" on behalf of the organisation. He also published ULFA's propaganda magazine Bixex Prachar Patrika Doi-Kaun-Rang, which is still a resource for writers.

On 8 October 1989, Sharma was lynched by a mob. It happened when he and Hitesh Kalita alias Raju Baruah entered the house of Nemi Chand Jain, in front of the Nalbari Hari Mandir. There was a gunfight and after the incident, Sampat Jain, Mulchand Jain, Satish Tamuli, Rajkumar Sharmah were killed in that incident. Following that, a mob attacked Rajen and Hitesh, which led to Rajen's death.

On Sharma's death, the ULFA held a public condolence meeting in his native village, where he was offered organisational condolences with flag hoisting and blank firing. The district unit of All Assam Students' Union (AASU) called a "bandh" (closure for 24 hours) on the very next day in protest of the killing of Sharma.
