= Jeraigaon =

Jeraigaon Jerai Gaon
- Village
- Map of Assam Jeraigaon (India)
- Coordinates: 27.5094°N 95.24473°E
- Country: India
- State: Assam
- District: Dibrugarh
- region: Chabua

Area
  - Total: 365.16 ha (902.3 acres)

Population (2011)
  - Total: 1,664
  - Density: 455.7/km^{2} (1,180/sq mi)

Languages
  - Official: Assamese
- Time zone: UTC+5:30 (IST)
- Postal code: 786183

Jeraigaon aso known as Jerai Gaon is a census village under Chabua in Dibrugarh district, Assam, India. As per 2011 Census of India, Jeragigaon has population of 1,664 people out of which 852 are males and 812 are females.

Jeraigaon is famous as the birthplace of ULFA leader Paresh Baruah and Anup Chetia.
