= Pranati Deka =

Indian politician and insurgent

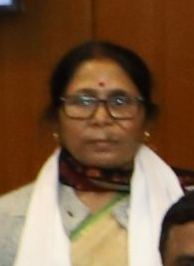
- Deka in 2023
- Born: Nalbari, Assam
- Spouse: Chitraban Hazarika
- Parent: Chandra Kanta Deka (Father)
- Status: freed
- Criminal charges: Terrorism

Pranati Deka (Assamese: প্ৰণতি ডেকা) is the Cultural Secretary of the outlawed outfit ULFA in Assam. She hails from Nalbari district of Assam. She is also the wife of the outfit's finance secretary Chitrabon Hazarika.

== Arrest ==
Deka was first arrested on 23 August 1996, from Jaslok Hospital in Mumbai. She was released on bail in 1998. In 2003 she was again arrested at Phulbari in Garo Hills district of Meghalaya while trying to escape.

== Charges ==
Cases registered against her are:

Police Stations	Charges
Panbazar (Guwahati) PS	under Passports Act
North Lakhimpur PS	under Sec 120, 121, 121(A) of the IPC
Special Branch of Assam Police	has 2 cases
Lakhimpur PS	2 TADA cases

== See also ==
- List of top leaders of ULFA
- Sanjukta Mukti Fouj
