= Secret killings of Assam =

Series of murders in India

The secret killings of Assam (1998–2001) were a period in Assam's political history when relatives, friends, and sympathisers of ULFA insurgents were systematically killed by unknown assailants. These extra-judicial murders happened in Assam between 1998 and 2001.

During the government of Asom Gana Parishad (AGP) leader Prafulla Kumar Mahanta, a number of family members of ULFA leaders were assassinated by unidentified gunmen. With the fall of this government following elections in 2001, the secret killings stopped. Investigations into the killings culminated in the report of the "Saikia Commission", presented to the Assam Assembly November 15, 2007. The report provides details about the killings, which were organized by Prafulla Mahanta in his role as the Assam Home Minister, and executed by the police, with cooperation from the Indian Army. The actual killers were surrendered elements of the ULFA, who would approach their targets at home, at night, knocking on the door and calling out in Assamese to allay suspicion. When the victims answered the door, they were shot dead or kidnapped to be killed elsewhere. Chief Minister Tarun Gogoi in August 2005 constituted the Justice K N Saikia Commission of enquiry. The Commission submitted its Secret Killings of Assam's Report part by part and the action taken. The report was submitted on October 15, 2007, the digitized version of the report can be downloaded from Archive.org

== See also ==
- Assamese Separatist Movement
- Assamese nationalism
- Kakopathar Massacre
- North-East India
- Operation All Clear
