= Pradip Gogoi =

Indian terrorist

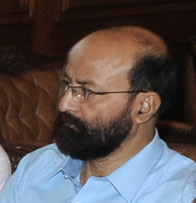
- Born: Bidhan; Sibsagar, Assam
- Other name: Samiran Gogoi
- Status: Bailed
- Criminal charges: Terrorism

Pradip Gogoi, alias Samiran Gogoi, is the vice-chairman and a founder member of the outlawed outfit ULFA in Assam. He was arrested in Kolkata by West Bengal Police on 8 April 1998 and put in judicial custody at Guwahati. A former electricity board employee, Gogoi hails from Sibsagar district of Assam. Since his arrest he has been facing 6 TADA cases.

== Charges ==
Cases registered against him are:

Police Stations	Charges
Sivasagar PS	Two TADA cases
Special Operations Unit of Assam Police (Special Branch)	under Sec 121 and 121(A) of the IPC
Jalukbari (Guwahati) PS	under Sec 302, 304 and 427 of IPC
Dispur (Guwahati) PS	under Sec 302 of IPC
Geetanagar (Guwahati) PS and Chandmari (Guwahati) PS	Four TADA cases and also several other cases

== Bail granted ==
On 19 February 2010, TADA judge Soneka Bora of the designated TADA court at Guwahati granted Gogoi bail in three cases—Tada sessions case numbers 1/90, 42/01 and 43/01 — against a surety of Rs 1 lakh for each case. He was granted the bail on conditions that he would not travel abroad till the disposal of the cases, would deposit his passport in the court and not leave the area under the jurisdiction of the without prior permission from the court and if he decides to live in Sivasagar, his hometown, he must regularly report to the police there. The decision of the other cases registered against him will be heard on 23 February 2010.

== See also ==
- ULFA
- Sanjukta Mukti Fouj
- People's Consultative Group
- List of top leaders of ULFA
