= Drishti Rajkhowa =

Indian separatist

- Born: Manoj Rabha; Rangjuli, Goalpara, Assam, India
- Status: Surrendered (surrendered)
- Other name: Drishti Asom
- Years active: 1988-2020
- Organization: United Liberation Front of Asom (Independent)
- Spouse: Lilla D Marak
- Children: Priyanka, Prateek
- Parent(s): Dhaneswar Rabha, Sushuila Rabha, killed by secret killers

Drishti Rajkhowa (Assamese: দৃষ্টি ৰাজখোৱা) alias Drishti Asom, (Real name: Manoj Rabha) was until 2011 the Commander of the 109 battalion of ULFA, the banned outlawed group of Assam. He was said to be one of the close confidantes of the group's commander-in-chief Paresh Baruah and an RPG expert. He is also a central committee member of the group. In November 2011, ULFA commander-in-chief Paresh Baruah promoted him as the deputy commander-in-chief along with Bijay Das alias Bijay Chinese, forming a new central committee after Arabinda Rajkhowa and his followers involved with Lateral talk to government of India.

== Militancy life ==
Rajkhowa joined the ULFA in 1988 and adopted the alias Drishti Rajkhowa. He was trained in Myanmar and Afghanistan-Pakistan border.

In an interview with The Week Rajkhowa revealed that he was trained in Burma from 1989 to 1995, and after that he was sent to Assam and then Bangladesh. In that interview Rajkhowa also revelead that he was trained in Afghanistan-Pakistan border for three months in June 1995.

Rajkhowa is responsible for ULFA(I)’s military action which mined a CRPF convoy in 2010, killing five and injuring 33, and ambushing the Indian Army in Manipur’s Chandel district in 2015 killing 18 soldiers.

== Surrender Rumor ==
Though Drishti Rajkhowa surrendered in 2020, a news portal, Times of Assam, published a report in 2016 that Drishti Rajhkhowa would leave the outfit.

== Surrender ==
On 11 November 2020, Drishti Rajkhowa surrendered in Meghalaya. The Indian Army called a media briefing about his surrender at the Army's Red Horns Division (Rangia) Auditorium on 12 November 2020.

Rajkhowa had to surrender because of continuous police operations in the Garo Hills. His group had a narrow escape in a Police encounter in Bolchugre village on 20 October 2020 and thereafter the group was gheraoed by Security Forces leaving no other option but to surrender. Paresh Baruah said "Fourteen days back Drishti was engaged in an encounter with security forces in Garo Hills and for seven days he was gheraoed by security forces along with other cadres. He was in constant touch with me and I told him not to take the extreme step and asked him to stop fighting knowing fully well about his wife’s health condition and the wellbeing of his two children. Surrender was the only option for him left." Baruah also said "Rajkhowa was surrounded by the security forces for about a week and that he also thought of committing suicide"

Sources claimed that Rajkhowa had to surrender because of his wife’s deteriorating health.

== Personal life ==
Rajkhowa is married to Lilla D Marak who was also a trained ULFA militant, and they both have dauther and son named Priyanka and Prateek.

=== Secret killing of family ===
On the night of 9 March 1999, Drishti Rakhowa's parents Dhaneswar Rabha and Sushila Rabha were killed by SULFA, behind the mask of the Secret killings of Assam. Since then, the parental home of Drishti remained 'no person land'.

== Political life ==
Rajkhowa joined political party BJP in July 2025.

== See also ==
- List of top leaders of ULFA
- Tapan Baruah
- Sanjukta Mukti Fouj
- 28th Battalion (ULFA)
