= Paresh Baruah =

Assamese insurgency leader

- Born: 15 February 1957 (age 69); Jeraigaon, Chabua, Assam, India
- Other name: Paresh Asom
- Known for: Chairperson and the Commander-in-chief of the ULFA (Independent)
- Spouse: Boby Bhuyan Baruah
- Children: 2

Paresh Baruah is an Assamese separatist militant leader and the chief of staff of the United Liberation Front of Asom, a designated terrorist organisation by the Government of India. Baruah is one of the founding members of the ULFA and single handedly driven away the outfit after Arabinda Rajkhowa led Pro-truce ended with defuncting their ideological concept following years long lateral talks with Indian Union.

== Early life and family ==
Paresh Baruah was born in 1957 at Jeraigaon, Chabua of Dibrugarh district, Assam, India to a Matak family.

Baruah completed his HSLC from Panitola High School in 1974 and HS from Tinsukia College in 1976 with 1st Division in both exams. He joined ULFA while pursuing his Bachelor's degree study.

In December 2010, Paresh e-mailed the Indo-Asian News Service reporting that his elder son (19) has been abducted in Bangladesh "to exert mental pressure on his family and to force him to surrender." Later, the ULFA said that his son was beaten sorely by the kidnappers "to pressure him to disclose his father's whereabouts, sources of income and business", but was allowed to leave after painstaking interrogation. The organisation further claimed that Baruah's son was terrified to stay tight-lipped about his kidnapping. In his e-mail, Baruah also wrote:

"My son is not important or bigger than my people and the cause for which we are struggling. No one can make me or my family weak just because my son has been kidnapped, and let me tell you, we are prepared to sacrifice our son but at no cost I would [sic] waiver on my stand."

He described the incident as a stratagem of Indian officials but they denied the accusation.

Times of Assam has claimed that the Indian intelligent agencies may be trying to ferret out Baruah by closely monitoring Sunlee. The newspaper further claimed that numerous pictures of Sunlee were gathered by the intelligence agencies in early 2012. The Union Home Secretary of India has said that Baruah's family is not desirous to return to India, because of their stiff attitude. A collaborator of Baruah has said that two aides of Arabinda Rajkhowa were sent to Bangladesh to convince his and Anup Chetia's family to come back to India.

== Role as ULFA leader and demand of Independent Assam ==
In 2004, Baruah was constantly in touch with some academics including Indira Goswami and numerous organisations, but he was switched to a secure location to undergo a surgery due to a medical emergency, which temporarily halted the communication. Around 2008, he was again in frequent e-mail communication with the Assamese author, Indira Goswami. She acted as a mediator in proposed peace talks between ULFA leaders and the government of India. He was alleged to have insisted on the Independence of Assam, and the peace talks did not take place.

In January 2010, G. K. Pillai had substantial talks with his official Myanmar counterpart at Nay Pyi Taw on numerous issues, but Baruah was one of the main focal points. Later, an official from the Ministry of Home Affairs conveyed to the press that Myanmar has promised to capture Baruah, if he is discovered in the country. Later in August, the Indian agencies claimed that within January, Baruah was legally provided the Chinese visa which authorised him to stay in China for a maximum time period of six months. The agencies further claimed that the Chinese visa was given to him on a Bangladeshi passport which was further reported to have been issued under his alias Kamrul Zaman. But, the Chinese Foreign Ministry had repudiated the allegations, claiming that it had never rendered assistance to the ULFA's commander-in-chief.

A photograph of Baruah and the ULFA cadres holding arms and dressed in combat fatigues was strategically provided to the press by the organisation in 2011. The organisation also distributed a video of Baruah to the media groups in which he was dancing with the cadres of ULFA, during the Bihu festival. The video was seen as an attempt to intimidate the government of India and the ULFA members who agreed to lay down arms. In the video, the ULFA cadres can be heard shouting slogans in favour of the secession of Assam. Earlier, the Indian government had granted bails to some of the high ranking arrested leaders of the ULFA "to try and isolate Baruah and hold formal peace talks".

In September 2011, the Myanmar Army was able to trace Manjit along with some ULFA members in the forest regions of north-west Myanmar and struck at them. But, despite sustaining injuries, he survived the onslaught. The same year, the then Home Secretary of India told media that the government of Myanmar has taken a journalist into custody, who was believed to have gone there to interview Baruah. A senior ULFA leader, Jivan Moran, was also arrested along with the reporter. This followed a hoax in media that Baruah had also been captured, but the Home Secretary denied receiving any such information.

Baruah was extensively reported to have shifted to China, but in 2012, he was sighted in Nagaland, goalkeeping in a football match between the team of the United Liberation Front of Assam, the National Democratic Front of Bodoland (NDFB) and the Nationalist Socialist Council of Nagaland (Khaplang) versus the People's Liberation Army of Manipur. The football match was organised as an attempt to promote cooperation between the insurgent organisations operating in India's North-East. Baruah has ruled out negotiations with the government of India without addressing the question of Independence for Assam, and described the "peace talks" between the "pro-talk faction" with the Indian government as "a sell-out by Ulfa chairman Arabinda Rajkhowa and other leaders." But, he added that the ULFA's "demand for Independence does not mean secession". He further declared that the "anti-talk faction" of ULFA will not halt their battle for the "Aai Asom (motherland)", and he had issued the "pro-talk faction" a deadline of three months to "break talks with the government and return to the outfit." After the ultimatum of three months was over without any response from Rajkhowa, the ULFA ousted him from his appointed ranks in the ULFA on 8 August 2012, and announced that Abhizeet Asom, who was working as the acting chairman, would serve the organisation as its chairperson since the day. Later on 30 April 2013, the wing led by Baruah, which adhere uncompromisingly to the demand of the Independence of Assam renamed the organisation as the ULFA – Independent. They believe the organisation's new name is "in tune with its uncompromising quest for liberation of Assam" from what they view as the "colonial Indian rule". Baruah said that he does recognises Rajkhowa's work but Asom is a more politically conscious individual.

"I would prefer death as pride rather than being a Commander of principleless cadres and in time, I will prove that. I can't betray 14,000 martyrs."

In March 2013, he castigated Rajkhowa's pronouncement to the journalists that Baruah is still the whole ULFA's commander-in-chief and will also join the ongoing talks," affirming that "he [Baruah] would never come forward for talks with the government under the framework of Constitution as it would not be able to solve the conflict as the solution lay only in restoration of Independence of Assam." He further accused the pro-talk faction of forgetting the 14,000 ULFA cadres who drew their last breath while battling with who he termed as the "Indian occupational forces."

Bhimkanta Buragohain alias Mama, who was one of the senior-most leaders of ULFA, and had held a meeting with Prime Minister Manmohan Singh in 2011 to achieve an understanding between the pro-talk faction of ULFA and the Indian government, once said:

"I'm sure that if we make some progress in talks, then he [Paresh Baruah] will have no choice but to join us, but if we fail, then he will have a big party in the jungle."

Baruah expressed sorrow on Buragohain's demise on 19 December 2011, and issued a joint official statement with Bormon stating that the ULFA's members are grieving over his death. He described the death of Buragohain as a "huge loss" to the organisation. They further declared a three days mourning, and announced to keep the ULFA's flags lowered in its camps.

One of his collaborator had alleged that G. K. Pillai had attempted to spread rumor regarding Baruah, to fabricate misconception about him amongst the people of Assam.

On 30 January 2014, a special court in Chittagong commuted death sentence to Baruah and 13 others for smuggling in 10 truckloads of firearms in 2004. On 18 December 2024, The High Court of Bangladesh commuted the death sentence of Paresh Baruah to life imprisonment. However, Baruah is unlikely to get intimidated by the Bangladeshi court's verdict, and is expected to continue with his activities. On 18 January 2025, his sentence was further reduced to 14 years in jail.

In June 2025, he was charged by a Guwahati court along with two others after several 'Bomb-like objects' were recovered in Assam.

== Views on the Maoist movement in India ==
He has an empathy with the Naxalites, and recently said in interview that the ULFA and the Communist Party of India (Maoist) have a "tactical understanding". In an e-mail sent to the media, he further quoted:

"Maoism in India has been born out of the government's failure to address to the minimum needs of the common man. We may have different ideologies but we share a common quest – of overthrowing the current social system and replacing it with a new one; our enemy is common and, on this count, the Maoists have our complete moral support."

Kishenji also acknowledged that the ULFA's "way" is dissimilar from the Maoists'. The "experts" hold the view the link between the Maoists and the ULFA "would remain on a purely strategic level" only.

== Controversies ==
In 2010, the BBC reported that Baruah is the prime arms supplier in Southeast Asia.

In April 2013, the news media alleged that on 10 April, Baruah had aggressively warned the artists to refrain from signing and performing on Hindi songs during the Rongali Bihu celebrations, and threatened to kill Zubeen Garg for not following their words. Tarun Gogoi also appreciated Garg for not listening to the ULFA. But, while being interviewed by an Assamese television channel, Baruah elucidated that the ULFA made "only an appeal to all artistes not to sing Hindi songs at Bihu functions" and that their "appeal" was misapprehend as a warning. He also stated that Garg must express regret for his comments over the organisation's appeal.

== See also ==
- Operation Bajrang
- Heerak Jyoti Mahanta
- Arabinda Rajkhowa
- List of top leaders of ULFA
- Raju Baruah
- Tapan Baruah
- People's Consultative Group
- Sanjukta Mukti Fouj
- Rendezvous with Rebels: Journey to Meet India's Most Wanted Men

== Bibliography ==
=== Books ===
- Pisharoty, Sangeeta Barooah (2019). Assam: The Accord, The Discord. [India]: Penguin Random House India Private Limited. ISBN 978-93-5305-622-3.
- Deka, Kanaksen (1994). ULFAR SWADHIN ASOM (in Assamese) (1st ed.). Guwahati: Dispur Print House.
- Bhattacharyya, Rajeev (2014). Rendezvous with Rebels: Journey to Meet India's Most Wanted Men. Noida, Uttar Pradesh, India: HarperCollins Publishers India. ISBN 978-93-5136-316-3.
- Bhattacharyya, Rajeev (2023). ULFA: The Mirage of Dawn. Noida, Uttar Pradesh, India: HarperCollins. ISBN 978-93-5699-304-4.
