= Sashadhar Choudhury =

Foreign Secretary of the outlawed group ULFA (born 1965)

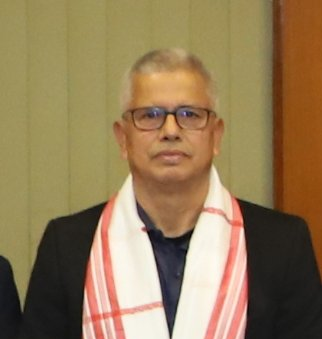
- Choudhury in 2023
- Born: Sailen Choudhury; 1965; Helacha gaon, Nalbari, Assam
- Spouse: Runima Choudhury
- Children: Shishir Anan Choudhury (Daughter)
- Parent(s): Dinabandhu Choudhury (Father), Bhadravati Choudhury (Mother)
- Status: Arrested
- Criminal charges: Waging war against India, Possessing illegal arms and cash

Sashadhar Choudhury (also known as Sasha Choudhury (real name Sailen Choudhury) is the Foreign Secretary of the outlawed group ULFA, Assam. His predecessor was Javed Bora. He hails from Helosa gaon in Nalbari district of Assam. He is married to Runima Choudhury and they have a daughter Shishir.

== Education ==
Choudhury has a diploma in civil engineering and educated himself in diplomacy in Philippines. At times he represented ULFA at international fora including the UN. He is known to be the only English-speaking ULFA member who even interrupts his interrogators to correct their language.

== Arrest ==
On Sunday night, 1 November 2009, some unidentified gunmen took Choudhury, along with the group's finance secretary Chitrabon Hazarika away from a house in sector 3 of Uttara in Dhaka. Later they were pushed back to the Indo-Bangladesh border where they were detained by BSF in Tripura while trying to infiltrate. They were handed over to Assam Police on 6 November by the BSF. But according to the Assam Police, the leaders surrendered before BSF in Tripura fleeing the crackdown against them in Bangladesh. Choudhury had earlier been arrested in Mizoram in 1996 and was released on bail.

On Saturday, 7 November 2009, the Special Operation Unit of the Assam police produced Choudhury and Hazarika before the court of Chief Judicial Magistrate, Kamrup (Metropolitan). His family was set free as there were no pending cases against them.

== Choudhury’s stand ==
While replying to media questions, Choudhury said that they had not surrendered but were arrested by Bangladeshi Police commandos. "Mori jam kintu Sasha Choudhurye surrender nokore (Assamese: মৰি যাম কিন্তূ শশ চৌধুৰীয়ে surrender নকৰে; English: Sasha Choudhury will rather die than surrender)," he said while clarifying the circumstances of his "arrest".

== Charges ==
On 4 March 1997, arrest warrant was issued for Choudhury. He is charged with murder, voluntarily causing grievous hurt by dangerous weapon, mischief by causing damage, acts done by several persons in furtherance of common intention, commission of terrorist and disruptive acts. A case is filed in Chabua PS Case No. 96/89 U/S 302/326/427/34 IP R/W Sec. 3/4 TADA(P) Act.

== Reaction ==
On 9 November 2009, ULFA called for a 12-hour Assam bandh from 6 am demanding their unconditional release. ULFA chairman Arabinda Rajkhowa, in a statement issued through e-mail, described the two leaders’ arrest as a "ploy to sabotage the process of finding a political solution to the problem and destroy ULFA militarily."

== See also ==
- List of top leaders of ULFA
- Sanjukta Mukti Fouj
- People's Consultative Group
