= Tal Pathar =

Village in Tinsukia district, Assam, India

Talpathar
- Village
- Tal Pathar
- Map of Assam Talpathar (India)
- Coordinates: 27.5623°N 95.82547°E
- Country: India
- State: Assam
- District: Tinsukia
- region: Margherita

Population (2011)
  - Total: 1,772

Languages
  - Official: Assamese
- Time zone: UTC+5:30 (IST)
- Postal code: 786152

Tal Pathar, also known as Talpathar, is a village in Tinsukia district, Assam, India. As per the 2011 census of India, Tal Pathar has a population of 1,772 people including 887 males and 885 females.

Talpathar is militancy affected area for a long period.
