= E. N. Rammohan =

Indian Police Officer

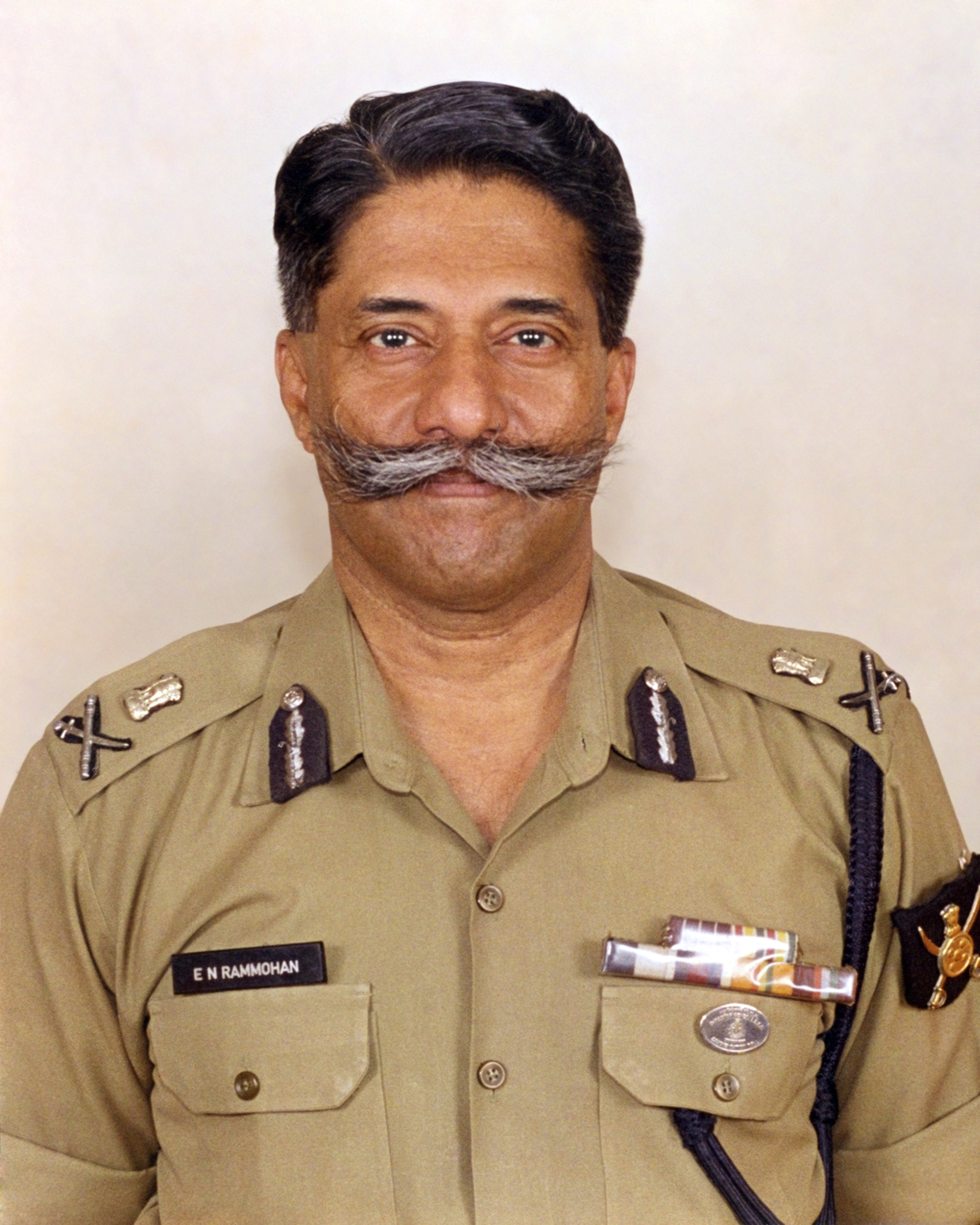
E.N. Rammohan as DG BSF, 2000

Edavelath Nalamveetil Rammohan (20 November 1940 – 8 April 2018) was an Indian Police Service (IPS) officer of the 1965 batch. He retired as the Director General (DG) of India's Border Security Force (BSF).

== Biography ==
Rammohan was born in Coimbatore, Tamil Nadu, to an educated Malayali family from Mahe in the Malabar region of Kerala. His parents, N.P. Laxmanan and E.K. Radha, moved to Madras (now Chennai) when he was three years old. His early school years were at Church Park Convent, Chennai, and he then moved to Christian College High School, Chennai. He finished school at 14 and went on to study a Bachelors in Science and a Masters in Zoology at Presidency College, Chennai. At college he played cricket and hockey, sports that he also enjoyed playing later at the National Police Academy. He also started practicing weightlifting, using the large grinding stones at home, typically found in South Indian kitchens.

== Career ==
While Rammohan was always keen to join the Indian Army, his father wouldn’t allow it and so he took up a job as a teacher and housemaster at Sainik School, Bhubaneshwar, in Odisha (then Orissa), where he worked for two years. Several of his students at this Sainik School went on to become senior Indian Army officers. While he was there he took the Indian civil services exam and qualified for the IPS (1965 batch). He chose to join the Assam cadre as he wanted a life of adventure and India’s north-east was a lesser-known region to him at the time. He began his career as SDPO (Sub Divisional Police Officer) Sibsagar and as Additional Superintendent of Police (ASP) Guwahati. In 1970 he went on deputation as the second-in-command of a battalion in the Indo-Tibetan Border Police (ITBP). Over the next couple of years he commanded an ITBP training centre. His stint also included doing courses on guerrilla warfare. He then came to ITBP headquarters in New Delhi. In 1976 he went to Meghalaya state as Superintendent of Police (SP) – East Khasi Hills, based in Shillong. In 1978 he went on deputation as SP, at the Central Bureau of Investigation for the North East and in 1979 he had a second tenure as SP, Shillong. In 1981 he was posted as Deputy Inspector General (DIG), Northern Range (Assam), based in Tezpur. He held charge during a tense time of ethnic riots and during the 1983 Assam elections. In 1984 he went on deputation as DIG heading a Sashastra Seema Bal (SSB) training centre in Halflong, Assam, and later that year moved to Delhi as a founding member of the National Security Guard (NSG). From 1987-1990 he served as DIG at the Central Bureau of Investigation (CBI) for Andhra Pradesh and Karnataka, based in Hyderabad, and returned to CBI headquarters in Delhi in June 1990 as Inspector General (IG). In November 1990 he went to Assam as IG Operations when President’s rule was imposed in the state. He worked closely with the Indian Army in counter-insurgency operations, including Operation Rhino. In February 1993 he went on deputation as IG Central Reserve Police Force for the North East and later that year, in June 1993, the government sought his services in Jammu & Kashmir, as IG BSF based at Srinagar. In 1995 he came to BSF headquarters in Delhi as IG Operations and Personnel and in December 1997 he was appointed DG BSF, a tenure he held for three years until his retirement in November 2000. During his tenure as DG BSF, the force also contributed during the Kargil War. Rammohan also led the BSF in its bi-annual border talks with Pakistan and Bangladesh during these years.

Post-retirement, he was advisor to the Governor of Manipur from June 2001 to March 2002. He advised the government of Manipur in various capacities on counter-insurgency and border management issues. In 2010 he was appointed by the Union Home Ministry to investigate the events leading to the attack and killing of 76 CRPF jawans in Dantewada. His report submitted to the Union Home Ministry has not been made public. He also traveled with a fact-finding mission of civil society organisations to Gujarat in the aftermath of the Godhra Riots.

He wrote numerous articles and research papers on border management and counter-insurgency and spoke extensively at seminars and symposiums. He was outspoken in his views about the root causes of insurgency and how it could not have only a police or military solution. He spoke strongly in favor of the Fifth Schedule of the Indian Constitution that protects the rights of tribal people in India. He believed the denial of land rights and non-implementation of land-ceiling laws was one of the root causes of insurgency. Another reason he mentioned was the exploitation of tribal people, when it came to accessing forest produce or mineral rights to their land.

== Personal life ==
E.N. Rammohan was married in 1969 to K.M. Prema (Kalandi Maroli Prema). They had two children. Their son, Major K.E. Padmanabhan, was a pilot in the Indian Army Aviation Corps, who died in a helicopter crash during a casualty evacuation mission in Ladakh, on 15 August 2008. He was awarded a Sena Medal (Gallantry) for this mission. Their daughter, K.E. Priyamvada, is a publishing professional, based in New Delhi. She was the winner of Mastermind India in the year 2000, and is the author of several books.

== Publications ==
- Simply Khakhi (2005)
- Insurgent Frontiers: Essays From the Troubled Northeast (2006)
- South Asia and the Rise of Islamic Fundamentalism (2007)
- The Implacable Taliban, Repeating History in Afghanistan (2010)
- Countering Insurgencies in India: An Insider's View (2011)

== Awards ==
- President's Police Medal for Distinguished Service (1991)
- ZEE TV – Ananya Samman for Lifetime Achievement (2010)
