= Nalbari College =

College in Assam

- Motto: বিদ্যয়া বিদ্যতে অমৃতম্
- Established: 1945
- Affiliations: Gauhati University, Krishna Kanta Handiqui State Open University
- Principal: Dr. Kamal Narayan Patowary
- Students: 3000+
- Location: Nalbari, Assam, 781335, India; 26.436664328658242°N 91.44384481623607°E
- Campus: Rural
- Website: nalbaricollege.org
- Location within Assam Location within India

Nalbari College is in Nalbari, Assam, India. It was founded in 1945. The college is affiliated to Gauhati University and recognized by University Grants Commission (UGC).

Since its inception, the institution imparts higher education to the economically backward people of this locality, especially those belonging to Scheduled Castes and Scheduled Tribes communities.

== Academics ==
Nalbari College offers a wide array of Higher Secondary, undergraduate and postgraduate courses. All undergraduate courses commencing according to the three-year undergraduate honours degree system.

=== Arts ===
- Assamese
- Economics
- Education
- English
- Geography
- History
- Logic and Philosophy
- Political Science
- Sanskrit

=== Science ===
- Physics
- Chemistry
- Zoology
- Botany
- Mathematics
- Geology
- Computer Science
- Statistics
- Physical Education
