= List of top ULFA leaders =

This is a list of top United Liberation Front of Assam leaders. Some of them are founder members and 16 are from the outfit's Central Committee, the ULFA's supreme decision-making authority.

== Political wing ==
Name	Real Name	Aliases	Designation	Other Info	Status
Arabinda Rajkhowa	Rajiv Rajkonwar	Mijanur Rahman Choudhury	Chairman	Founder leader Central committee member	Released under bail by Gauhati High Court
Abhizeet Asom	Dr. Mooqool Hazarika	Abhizeet Bormon	Chairman	Selected chairman after Arabinda Rajkhowa joined lateral talk with Government of India.	General Practitioner in London, UK.
Pradip Gogoi	Pradip Gogoi	Samiran Gogoi	Vice-chairman	Founder leader Central committee member	Released under bail by Gauhati High Court
Anup Chetia	Golap Baruah	Sunil Baruah; Bhaijan; Ahmed	General Secretary	Founder leader Central Committee member: Not in lateral talk with the Indian Government.	Released under bail by Gauhati High Court as of 24 Dec 2015.
Ashanta Bagh Phukan	Tarun Phukan		Organization secretary	Central committee member	Missing since 2003 Bhutan War
Chitrabon Hazarika	Bon Hazarika	Ashfaqul Hossein	Finance Secretary	Central committee member First financial secretary	Released under bail by Gauhati High Court.
Uddipta Hazarika	Rajen Sharma	Uddipta Hazarika	Central Publicity Secretary	Central committee member; The first publicity secretary of the outfit	Lynched in 1989
Mithinga Daimary	Deepak Kachari	Megan Kachari	Central Publicity Secretary	Central committee member; Permanent publicity secretary until organizational split	Arrested in Bhutan in 2003 and released on bail from Guwahati Central Jail on 25 February 2010.
Ramu Mech		Prabin Konwar, Sailen Barua	Assistant Finance Secretary	Core committee member; First finance secretary	Given retirement by the Organization and released by Guwahati High Court due to his illness.
Sashadhar Choudhury	Shashadhar Choudhury	Sailen Choudhury, Rafiqul Islam	Foreign Secretary	Central committee member; Permanent foreign secretary	Released under bail by Gauhati High Court
Navajyoti Hazarika			Assistant Foreign Relation Officer		Surrendered
Bhimkanta Buragohain	Bishnujyoti Buragohain	Mama, Father, Sir	Advisor and ideologue	Founder leader; *Central Committee member; Also called the father of ULFA	Dead
Pranati Deka			Cultural Secretary	Central Committee member	Released under bail by Gauhati High Court

== Military Wing ==
Name	Real Name	Aliases	Designation	Other Info	Status
Paresh Baruah	Paban Baruah	Kamruj Zaman Khan	Commander in Chief	Founder leader Central Committee member	Wanted
Heerak Jyoti Mahanta	Heerak Jyoti Mahanta	Naren Deka, Jayanta Medhi	Deputy Commander in Chief	Founder leader Central Committee member	Killed, 31 December 1991
Raju Baruah	Hitesh Kalita	Anees Ahmed	Operation Commander	Central Committee member	Released on Bail
Michael Deka Phukan	Joy Chandra Das	Michael Asom	Current Deputy Commander in Chief		Wanted
Bening Rabha	Binod Rabha		Chief of United Liberation force of Asom		Missing since Bhutan war
Robin Neog			SO to COS		Missing
Kamal Borah			Chief Training Officer		Surrendered
Samarjit Chaliha			QM GHQ/Dir		Arrested in Bhutan was
Chakra Gohain			OIC Arms		Surrendered
Tapan Baruah	Madan Das	Jayanta Handique	Founder Commander of 28th Battalion	Action Group Commander	Killed, 18 May 2002
Drishti Rajkhowa	Manoj Rabha	Drishti Asom	Deputy C-in-Chief after Heerak Jyoti Mahanta	Central Committee member	Surrendered
Amal Narzary					
Chintamani Hazarika			Central Auditor		Surrendered
Neelu Chakraborty			Office Secretary		Missing since Bhutan war
Manik Sarma			Medical Officer		Surrendered
Bhaskar Dutta			Political Affairs Officer		Surrendered
Bhaskar Choudhury			RT IC		Surrendered
Prahlad Saikia			Camp Adjt		Surrendered
Manas Gogoi			WT IC		
Dipul Kalita			Battalion Sergeant major		Surrendered

== See also ==
- ULFA
- SULFA
- Sanjukta Mukti Fouj
- 28th Battalion (ULFA)
- Bhomita Talukdar
