= Bhimkanta Buragohain =

Indian revolutionary

- Born: October 1931; Kakopathar, Tinsukia, Assam
- Died: 19 December 2011 (aged 80); Dhala Ahomgaon, Tinsukia, Assam
- Other names: Mama, Sir

Bhimkanta Buragohain was an Assamese militant leader who served as the political advisor and ideologue of the revolutionary organisation United Liberation Front of Assam (ULFA) in Assam. He was also one of the founder leaders of the organisation.

== Arrest ==
He was arrested by the Bhutanese Royal Army during Operation All Clear in December 2003 and was handed over to the Indian Army in January 2004. He was released from jail after seven years on 5 December 2010.

== Rumours of death ==
The ULFA claimed that Buragohain had been captured and killed during Operation All Clear by the Royal Bhutan Army (RBA) while he was leading a group of women and children who were attempting to surrender and waving a white flag. Arabinda Rajkhowa, the chairman of the outfit, also appealed to the Bhutan King to return the dead body to his family. It also called a 48-hour Assam Bandh general strike on 20–21 December 2003. The RBA claimed that Buragohain was neither captured nor killed, whereas the Indian Army asserted that he had been killed. The Guwahati High Court on 23 December 2003 directed the Army authority to hand over the body, if in their possession, to the nearest police station so that his family could perform the last rites.

On 26 December 2003, Lt. Gen. Mohinder Singh, General Officer Commanding 4 Corps, in Tezpur, disproving the rumours and claims made by ULFA and other organizations, produced Buragohain to the media. On 27 December 2003, he was accompanied by self-styled Major Robin Handique, SS Major Amarjit Gogoi and Bolin Das. Buragohain was imprisoned in Tezpur Jail and then in Guwahati Central jail.

== Charges ==
Cases registered against Buragohain in various police stations of Assam are:

| Police Stations | Charges |
|---|---|
| Tezpur police station | under Section 121, 121(A), 122 of the IPC, Arms Act, read with Sec 10/13 of the Unlawful Activities (Prevention) Act |
| Dibrugarh PS | under Section 121, 121(A), 122 of the IPC |
| Special Operations unit of Assam Police (Special Branch) | under Sec 10/13 of the UA (P) Act, and at least one TADA case |

== Death ==
He died of cardiac arrest at his residence at Dhala Ahomgaon, Tinsukia district, Assam on 19 December 2011.

== See also ==
- List of top leaders of ULFA
- Sanjukta Mukti Fouj
- People's Consultative Group
- Operation All Clear
