= Harekrishna Deka =

Indian police officer and writer

Harekrishna Deka is a former member of the Indian Police Service who is now known for his writing. He was the Director General of Police for Assam from 2000–2003.

== Literary career ==
Harekrishna Deka started writing poems and short stories in his student days, and continued this as a hobby during his police career.

He has won the following awards:

- 1987 - Sahitya Akademi Award for his poem Ann Ejan
- 1995 - Katha Award for his short story Bandiyar (Prisoner)
- 2010 - Assam Valley Literary Award

After retiring from the police service, Deka briefly edited the English daily The Sentinel before editing the Assamese literary monthly Gariyasi.

== Bibliography ==
=== Poetry ===
- Swarabor (Voices) 1972
- Ratir Sobhajatra (Procession by Night) 1978
- Aan Ejan (Another One), 1986, also translated to Bengali and Oriya
- Kabita 1960-1980 (Poems 1960-1980), 2002
- Bhalpoar Babe Exar (A Word for Love), 2003
- Xanmihali Barnamala (Mixed Alphabets), 2010
- Sea-Scare (poems translated to English), 2001

=== Short stories ===
- Prakritik aru Anyanya (The Natural and other stories), 1900
- Madhusudanar Dolong (Madhusudan's Bridge), 1992
- Bandiyar (Captive), 1996, Also translated to Oriya
- Post-modern athaba Galpa (Post-modern or Short Story), 2001
- Mrityudanda (Death Sentence), 2006
- Galpa aru Kalpa (Story and Fiction), 2009

=== Literary criticism ===
- Adhunikatavad aru Anyanya Prabandha (Modernism and other essays), 1998
- Beekson aru Xandhan (Insight and Investigation), 2000
- Dristi aru Sristi (Look and Creation), 2006
- Nilamani Phukan: Kabi aru Kabita (Nilamani Phukan: the poet and his poems), 2010

=== Novels ===
- Agantuk (Strangers), 2008

=== Edited books ===
- Tarun Prajanmar Kabita (Poetry of the Young Generation), 2005

=== Translations ===
- Pratixarita Rashmi (Refracted Light). Translation of poems of Saint John Perse, Yanis Ritsos, Vasco Popa and Jaroslav Seifert, 1992

=== Social criticism ===
- Prabrajan aru Anupravex (Immigration and Infiltration), 2010
- Xarbabhoumatva, Xantraxvad aru Nagarik Xamaj (Sovereignty, Terrorism and Civil Society), 2010

== See also ==
- List of Indian poets
- Assamese literature
- History of Assamese literature
- List of Assamese-language poets
- North-East India
- Literature from North East India

== General references ==
- Bora, Prabhat (28 October 2010). "An Interview With The Poet: Harekrishna Deka". The Indian Review.
