= Raju Baruah =

ULFA rebel

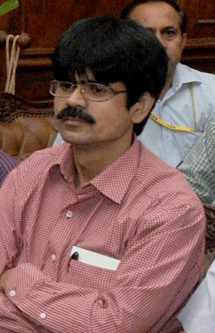
- Baruah in 2012
- Born: Hitesh Kalita; Bahjani, Nalbari, Assam
- Other name: Anees Ahmed
- Spouse: Nirola Neog
- Children: Hemacheta/Pragati (daughter)
- Parent: Sajyabala Kalita (Mother)
- Status: Released on Bail, 27 November 2010
- Criminal charges: Revolution against Indian Federation

Raju Baruah (Assamese: (ৰাজু বৰুৱা) (real name Hitesh Kalita), alias Anees Ahmed, is the Deputy Commander-in-Chief, the Chief of military operations, military spokesperson and the head of the near-autonomous 'Enigma Force' of the banned outfit ULFA in Assam. When the outfit's Commander-in-Chief Paresh Baruah was said to be critically ill, Raju Baruah reportedly assumed to be the new military head.

== Trouble with C-in-C ==
ULFA's C-in-C Paresh Baruah has reportedly been speaking to various associates about a confederal agreement with the Government of India, subject to the approval of the outfit's General Body. Raju Baruah is known to have strongly opposed talks over which trouble has been brewing between the two. He was also believed to be publicly chastised by the C-in-C. All decision-making power had been taken away from him and he was said to be 'under treatment' - but in fact in quasi-detention - at the Mirpur Military Hospital.

== Death rumour ==
In December 2000, the Assam Rifles issued a press release in Agartala claiming that Baruah was killed in a gun-battle between two fractions of the outfit in the Chittagong hill tracts in Bangladesh. The next day a person identifying himself as Paresh Baruah called up newspaper offices and broadcasting agencies from an undisclosed location and rubbished the Army's claim and said that it was nothing but a mere propaganda of the Indian government against the outfit's movement and nothing had happened to Raju Baruah.

== Arrest ==
On 4 December 2009, Baruah with the outfit's chairman Arabinda Rajkhowa along with eight others, surrendered before the Indian authority near the Indo-Bangladesh border in Meghalaya. They were said to be taken into custody by the Border Security Force the moment they had crossed the border near Dawki in Meghalaya's East Khasi Hills.

== Release ==
After one year of jail custody under Government of Assam, Raju Barua got bail and released on 27 November 2010. Raju Baruah, was accorded a grand welcome by hundreds of his supporters on Saturday when he came out of Guwahati jail on Saturday. Earlier, Baruah was granted bail in two Tada cases and in one CBI case. After being released from jail, Baruah left for his native place Bahjani in Nalbari district under special security cover. His family and friends came to the Guwahati central jail to welcome him. Baruah said he would be involved in solving the Ulfa problem along with others.

== Public reactions & surrender ==
On 5 December 2009, Baruah along with the outfit's chairman Arabinda Rajkhowa and Rajkhowa's bodyguard Raja Baruah were produced before the chief judicial magistrate, Kamrup. He with Rajkhowa rubbished police's claim that they had surrendered. They emerged as heroes among the crowd for the denial of surrender. They got the biggest boost when public encouraged them not to surrender shouting - "Surrender nokoribaw" (Do not surrender). "Moi surrender kora nai aru surrender nokoruw (I have not surrendered and will never surrender)", said Baruah to the crowd.

== Coming to peace talk ==
As claimed, Baruah came to lateral talk with the Indian government.

== See also ==
- List of top leaders of ULFA
- Tapan Baruah
- Drishti Rajkhowa
- Sanjukta Mukti Fouj
