= Ashanta Baghphukan =

- Born: Tarun Phukan; 31 March 1963 (age 63); Assam
- Spouse: Hangshipa Hazarika alias Malina Ingtipi alias Hema Hansipi
- Children: Kareng (Daughter)
- Status: Missing
- Criminal charges: Terrorism

Ashanta Baghphukan (Assamese: অশান্ত বাঘফুকন) (born: 1963), (real name Tarun Phukan), was the Organising Secretary of ULFA, the banned terrorist group of Assam.

== Family and relatives ==
On 21 March 2006, Phukan's wife Hangshipa Hazarika (alias Malina Ingtipi alias Hema Hansipi) who is also a member of the group's women's wing, and daughter Kareng were handed over to the Deputy Commissioner of Nalbari by the Bhutanese Royal Government. They were taken into custody on the charge of attempting suicide after fasting for their missing husbands. They were accompanied by 64 relatives of other militants in ULFA and admitted to the Tamulpur 30-bedded hospital campus for primary check-ups. They were being nasal fed for they had refused to take food in custody. The move was largely condemned by the People's Committee of Peace in Assam, who viewed the police action as a way to stop questions regarding the 'missing' leaders. In retaliation, the PCPIA held a sit-in demonstration demanding the release of government-held information regarding the men. Along with Ashanta's wife Malina, the women who participated in the fast were: Jnama Moran, Padumi Timungpi, Manomati Barman, Anima Devi, and Menaka Changmai.

Though remaining unnamed, a video surfaced of Ashanta Baghphukan's daughter, reportedly still seeking information regarding her father's disappearance. The video was posted in November 2017, fourteen years after the operation took place.

== Court ==
On 13 March 2007, the Guwahati High Court directed the Central and State governments to submit information about the missing leaders by 30 March of that year. Having been allegedly taken for charges of terrorism, the wives of the missing men were demanding a case against the government upon the basis of human-rights violations. The women procured the trial by means of petition, noting that their husbands had been taken by the Royal Bhutan Army, but handed over to the Indian Army and that they had been given no information since. The central government accordingly submitted to the court an instruction related to it. The court, however, after proper examining the instruction, asked both governments to file an affidavit within seven days.

== ULFA and the Missing Leaders ==
Ashanta, along with five other senior ULFA leaders: Robin Neog, Bening Rabha, Nilu Chakraborty, Ponaram Dihingia, and Naba Changmai went missing during "Operation All Clear." This mission was carried out in an effort to bring Assam, an Indian state, under its own sovereignty. It was fought against the Royal Bhutanese Army in December 2003 and dealt devastating blows to the ethnic terrorist organization. Among those were the loss of ULFA's leaders (5 of only 28 the organization has had since inception) which many refused to accept as fact. Instead, ULFA supporters remain adamant that the leaders are being held by the army. In an anonymous article written by a previous ULFA leader, a woman recalls being escorted by the Royal Bhutan Army to safety at an Indian army camp during Operation All Clear. She was told Ashanta Baghphukan and Robin Neog would follow suit shortly, but never saw them again. Furthermore, upon her return the woman discovered that the Indian army had spread rumor of her death. This is what many believe happened to the missing ULFA leaders, but instead of being returned (as the woman was) are still being held.

It is of popular opinion that the intel providing evidence for the leaders being held by the Royal Bhutan Army is known among ULFA heads. There is debate over whether the men are hostage to the Indian or Royal Bhutan Army, but the consensus of them being alive and together remains. It's believed that the reason this information would be kept out of public knowledge is to protect the men from the backlash the Royal Bhutan Army would receive. If this occurred, Bhutan could simply kill the men and claim the accusations to be falsehoods. Instead, keeping the men alive and their status known to ULFA leaders gives Bhutan leverage over the terror organization.[7] In reference to the recent discussions between ULFA and the Government of India, public opinion favors the return of the missing ULFA leaders as a gesture of goodwill between the two entities. Moreover, they lament the effect the leaders could have had in the discussions.

== Attacks ==
After the disappearance of Ashanta Baghphukan in December 2003, a list of ULFA activities throughout the 2003 year were published online. As Chief Organizing Secretary of ULFA, Baghphukan would have been directly involved in these attacks. The fatalities over the course of 2003 total 20, with 67 injuries. They occurred in the following cities within the Indian State of Assam: Makum, Tinsukia, Bamungopha, Bongaigaon, Rangjuli, Kathalguri, Digboi, and Guwahati. The target types included military, businesses, utilities, police, private citizens, and private property. Two of these attacks have not been explicitly confirmed by the organization, but are suspected to have been ULFA. In 2003 the main weapon types attributed to these attacks were firearms and explosives including dynamite and bombs. All attacks have been limited to the south Asian region of Assam. Since Ashanta Baghphukan's disappearance in 2003, when the organization had been committing less terrorism than previous years, attacks spiked - peaking in 2007. Fatalities peaked in this year as well/ Furthermore, while only eight attacks are listed, six confirmed, it is likely there are other activities ULFA engaged in that were not attributed to the group during 2003. It is not clear when Ashanta Baghphukan joined the terrorist organization and that there are a scourge of attacks precipitating those in 2003 following ULFA's emergence in 1988. These attacks consistently mimicked similar target types utilizing violence via explosives. Baghphukan would have been 25 at this time.
