= Anup Chetia =

Indian insurgent

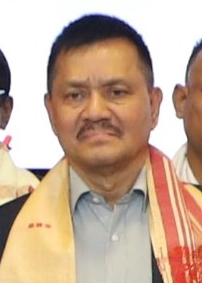
- Chetia in 2023
- Born: Golap Baruah; 1957 (age 68–69); Jeraigaon, Tinsukia, Assam
- Other names: Sunil Barua, Bhaijan or Ahmed
- Citizenship: Indian
- Movement: Liberation of Assam movement
- Status: Freed on bail
- Convictions: Illegally entering Bangladesh using a forged passport, Possession of illegal foreign currency from 16 different countries, The illegal possession of arms.
- Criminal charges: Killing; Kidnapping; Extortion; Terrorism
- Penalty: 7 years imprisonment

Details
- Date apprehended: 1997
- Imprisoned at: Kashimpur Jail, Dhaka

Anup Chetia (real name Golap Baruah also known as Sunil Baruah, Bhaijan or Ahmed) is the General Secretary of the banned United Liberation Front of Assam in Assam, India. He is also one of the founder leaders of the group. He was born at Jerai Gaon in Tinsukia district of Assam.

== Arrest ==
Chetia was first arrested in March 1991 in Assam but was released by then Chief Minister Hiteswar Saikia. Later on 21 December 1997 he was again arrested in Dhaka under the Foreigners Act and the Passports Act for illegally carrying foreign currency and a satellite phone. He was sentenced to seven years of imprisonment by a Bangladeshi court and was being held at Kashimpur Jail on the outskirts of Dhaka.

== Charges ==
Chetia was charged with:

- Illegally entering Bangladesh using a forged passport
- Possession of illegal foreign currency from 16 countries
- Illegal possession of arms.

He was also wanted by the Assam Police for various cases including killing, kidnapping and extortion.

== Extradition ==
Since his arrest in 1997, the Government of India has asked Bangladesh to extradite Chetia. The request was refused by Bangladesh on the ground that the two countries do not have an extradition treaty. However, India is still hopeful that the Sheikh Hasina government would accede to the request in view of its tough resolve against terrorism.

The Union Home Affairs joint secretary (north east) has recently said that Chetia will most probably be handed over to the Government of India by the Government of Bangladesh, by December 2013.

After the 15th India-Bangladesh Home Secretary-level meeting at Dhaka, Bangladesh Home Affairs Secretary Mozammel Haque Khan has confirmed that Bangladesh has agreed to hand over Anup Chetia to India, which will send back Nur Hossain, prime accused in a case of seven murders in Narayanganj.

== Seeking Political Asylum ==
On 7 December 2008, Chetia had written to the United Nations High Commissioner for Refugees urging it to grant him refugee status and political asylum in Bangladesh. In a letter to António Guterres, head of the Geneva-based UNHCR, Chetia pleaded that he had already completed seven years of imprisonment and hence was no longer a convict to be held in a jail. ULFA also appealed for political asylum in a safe country.

== Present status ==
Although Chetia was the General Secretary of ULFA, political analysts in the region doubt his current influence within the organization. On 11 November 2015, Anup was handed over by Bangladesh Government to India.

Anup Chetia has been released from the Guahati jail on bail on 24 December 2015.

== See also ==
- List of top leaders of ULFA
- People's Consultative Group
- Sanjukta Mukti Fouj
