= SULFA =

Group of terrorists

SULFA, short for Surrendered ULFA, refers to former members of the United Liberation Front of Assam that have surrendered to the Indian government.

Since 1990, the government of India has been attempting to capture members of ULFA. In 1992, a large group of high-ranking leaders and members surrendered to government authorities, which was the first time ex-ULFA members were referred to as "SULFA". Those that surrendered were disarmed by the government, leaving them without a means of defence against retaliation from their ex-associates. Those surrendering members that agreed to provide information to the government about the ULFA were offered bank loans to start a new life.
