= Arabinda Rajkhowa =

ULFA rebel leader

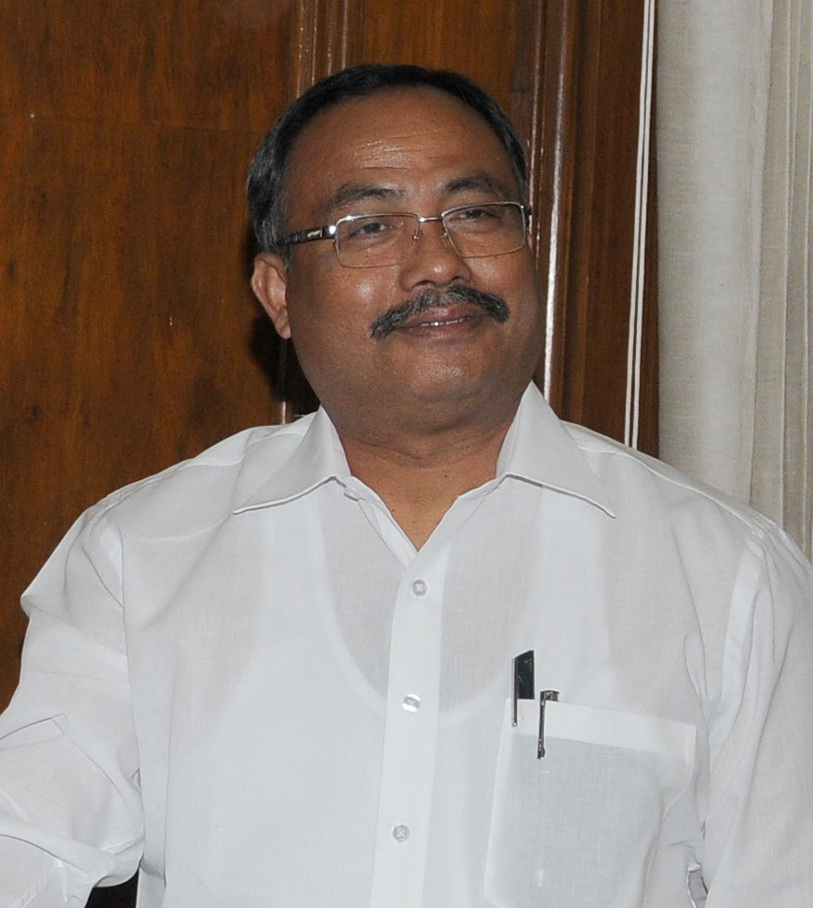
- Rajkhowa in 2011
- Born: Rajib Rajkonwar; 1956 (age 69–70); Ujoni Konwargaon, Lakwa; Sibsagar, Assam
- Other name: Mijanur Rahman Choudhury
- Spouse: Kaveri Kachari
- Children: 2
- Status: Freed

Arabinda Rajkhowa (born Rajib Rajkonwar) is a former chairman of ULFA and the current head of ULFA pro-talks faction which signed a peace accords with the Centre and the Assam government in the presence of Union Home Minister Amit Shah and Assam Chief Minister Himanta Biswa Sarma to solve the problem of insurgency in the region.

He is one of the founder members of the group. He was also the Vice-President of the Indo-Burma Revolutionary Front. He was a leader of the Asom Jatiyatabadi Yuva Chatra Parishad (AJYCP), a radical students' group in Assam, before he founded ULFA.

== Personal life ==
He was born to a prominent freedom fighter Umakanta Rajkonwar (born on 11 January 1901) and Damayanti Rajkonwar, ardent followers of Mahatma Gandhi, in 1956 in Ujani Konwargaon, Lakwa under Simaluguri in Sibsagar.

For his father, Umakanta Rajkonwar's outstanding contribution to the freedom movement, the Government of India awarded him Tamra Patra and a political pension in 1997 by Govt. of India. Rajkonwar is direct descendant of Ahom Prince Mantan Charing Raja, younger brother of Ahom King Jogeswar Singha of Assam, son of Baga Konwar Tipam Raja of Assam.

By profession, Arabinda Rajkhowa was a schoolteacher. He is said to be a soft-spoken and is fluent in nearly half a dozen languages.

In the late 1990s, Rajkhowa married Kaveri Kachari, a budding poet of that time. They had to spend the initial days of their marriage in jungles of Assam and Bhutan. They have two children Khamseng Bohagi Rajkumari (Daughter) and Aicheng Rajkonwar (Son).

Daughter, Khamseng Bohagi Rajkumari is currently the C.E.O of Charaideo Silk and Agro Producer Company Ltd.

== Arrest ==
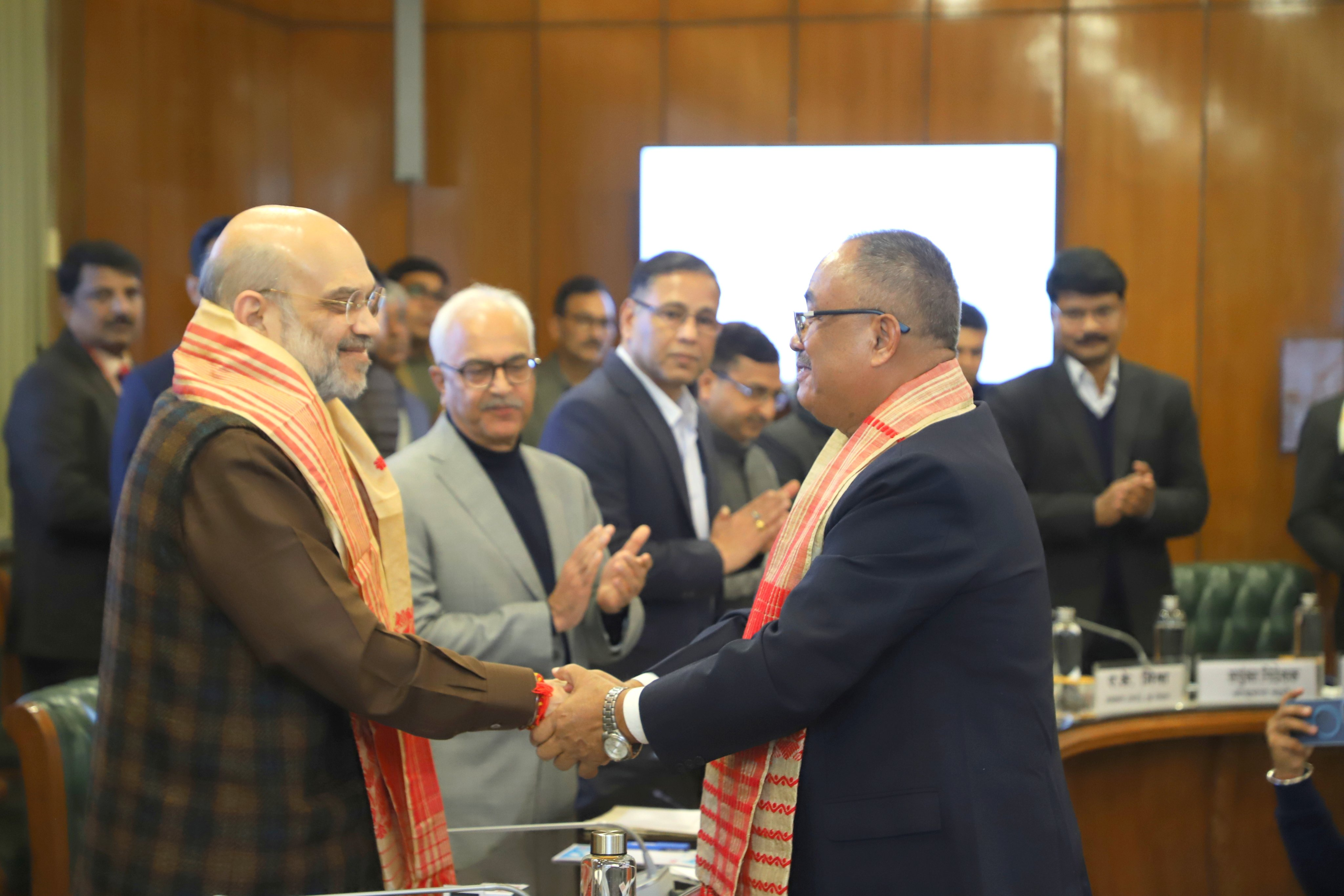
Home Minister Shri Amit Shah shaking hands with Shri Arabinda Rajkhowa after signing a memorandum of settlement to abjure the path of violence, surrender all arms and ammunition, join the peaceful democratic process as established by the law and uphold the integrity of the country.

On late Monday night, 30 November 2009, Bangladesh Police arrested Rajkhowa somewhere near Dhaka. He has been handed over to the Indian authorities. Meanwhile, according to North East TV channel, ULFA chairman Arabinda Rajkhowa claimed that reports of his arrest were aimed at creating confusion and derailing the peace process in Assam. "I am speaking to you from the same location in Bangladesh where I normally speak from. Those who say that I have been arrested are deliberately trying to create confusion. They want to derail the peace process in Assam even before it can begin," he reportedly told North East TV channel. But intelligence sources claim Rajkhowa had surrendered to Indian security forces in Agartala and was taken to New Delhi by a flight on late Wednesday. On 5 December 2009, Rajkhowa along with his bodyguard Raja Baruah and the group's deputy C-in-C Raju Baruah were produced before Robin Phukan, the chief judicial magistrate, Kamrup.

== Public reactions and surrender ==
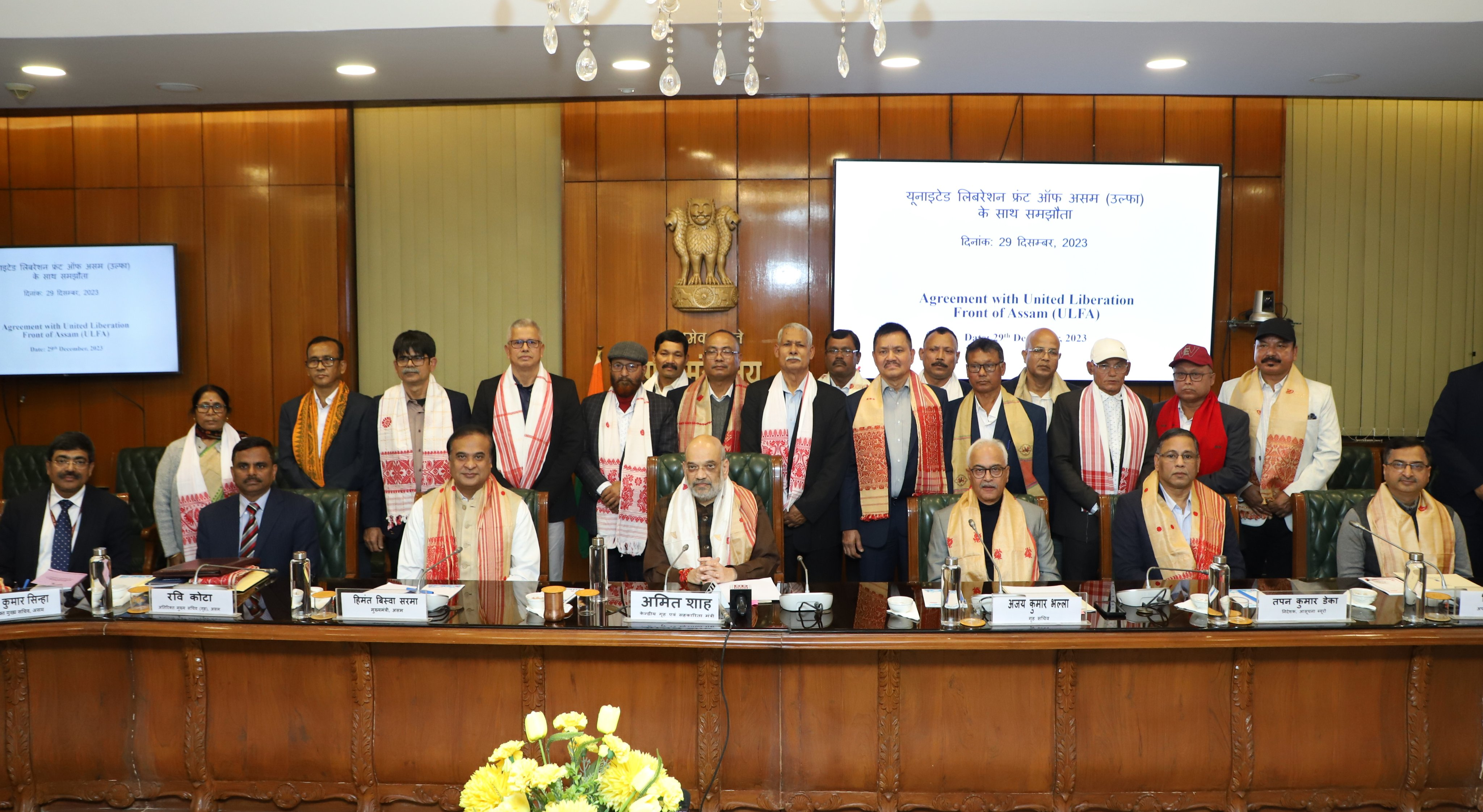
In presence of Union Home Minister and Minister of Cooperation, Shri Amit Shah, a Memorandum of Settlement signed between Government of India, Government of Assam and representatives of United Liberation Front of Assam (ULFA), in New Delhi, today. The Agreement is a significant milestone to fulfil Prime Minister Shri Narendra Modi’s vision of a peaceful, prosperous and insurgency-free Northeast and bringing everlasting peace, prosperity and all-round development of Assam. Assam Chief Minister, Dr. Himanta Biswa Sarma and senior officials of the Ministry of Home Affairs and Government of Assam were also present during the signing of the MoU.

Rajkhowa rubbished police's claim that they had surrendered. "We have not surrendered, we will never surrender", he cleared his stand as they were produced in court before Robin Phukan, the chief judicial magistrate, Kamrup. They emerged as heroes among the crowd for having denied their surrender. They got the biggest boost when public encouraged them not to surrender shouting - "Surrender nokoribo" (Do not surrender). The leader obliged the crowd saying "surrender nokoru moi (I will never surrender)". "If I would have surrendered then I would not have been brought to the court handcuffed," he said. The crowd filled up the air with slogans like "ULFA Zindabad" and "Rajkhowa Zindabad" (Long live ULFA & Long live Rajkhowa) the moment they appeared in the court premise.

== Release ==
Rajkhowa was released on bail from the Guwahati Central Jail on 1 January 2011. He was granted bail by a special TADA court Thursday after the government prosecutor gave no objection to Rajkhowa's bail petition. After his release he said that they were ready for unconditional peace talks with the government, but a formal decision to this effect could be taken at their executive meeting once all jailed leaders are released.

Although wife Kaveri and their two children were captured along with him, police had let off his family with no charges slapped against them. Rajkhowa's family has since been settled in his ancestral home in Lakwa in eastern Assam's Sivasagar district.

== Family ==
Rajkhowa's family consists of his wife Kaberi Kachari, 13-year-old daughter Khamsheng Bohagi Rajkumari and 5-year-old son Aicheng Rajkonwar alias Gadadhar Rajkonwar. His family members had also been caught although they were set free since no pending cases were there against them.

Rajkhowa's elder brother Ajay Rajkonwar reportedly told that he wants to take custody of his brother's family so that their 97-year-old mother could meet them. "We are ready to take custody of Kaveri and the two children -- 13-year-old daughter and five-year-old son -- and take them to our mother at Lakwa in Sibsagar. If Kaveri wants to stay back for the group's organisational work, we have nothing to say," he said to reporters.

== See also ==
- ULFA
- Sanjukta Mukti Fouj
- People's Consultative Group
- List of top leaders of ULFA
