= United Liberation Front of Asom =

Rebel organisation operating in state of Assam, India

- Founders: Bhupen Borgohain, Bhimkanta Buragohain, Pradip Gogoi, Suren Dihingia , Someswar Gogoi, Bhradeswar Gohain, Budheswar Gogoi
- Military leader: Paresh Baruah; Heerak Jyoti Mahanta †; Raju Baruah; Drishti Rajkhowa (surrendered); Michael Deka Phukan
- Political leader: Arabinda Rajkhowa; Bhimkanta Buragohain# Pradip Gogoi; Ashanta Bagh Phukan; Anup Chetia; Sashadhar Choudhury; Chitraban Hazarika; Mithinga Daimary; Pranati Deka
- Dates active: 7 April 1979 – 29 December 2023 (44 years) (Pro-truce faction); 7 April 1979 – present (47 years) (Anti-truce faction)
- Split to: United Liberation Front of Asom – Independent (ULFA-I) (Note: Active); United Liberation Front of Asom (Pro-truce faction) (Note: Disbanded)
- Allegiance: United National Liberation Front of Western South East Asia
- Headquarters: Myanmar, Bangladesh, Bhutan and China
- Active regions: Assam, India; Arunachal Pradesh, India; Nagaland, India; Sagaing Region, Myanmar
- Ideology: Assamese nationalism Socialism
- Status: Active (ULFA-I); Surrendered (ULFA pro-truce faction)
- Size: 1200 (2007); 1000+ (2020)
- Wars: Insurgency in Northeast India; Insurgency in Assam; Insurgency in Arunachal Pradesh

The United Liberation Front of Asom (ULFA) is an armed separatist insurgent organisation, that operates in the Indian state of Assam. It seeks to establish an independent sovereign nation state of Assam for the indigenous Assamese people through an armed struggle via the Assam conflict. The Government of India banned the organisation and designated it as a terrorist organisation in 1990 listing it under "other groups of concern".

According to ULFA sources, it was founded on 7 April 1979 at Rang Ghar and began operations in the mid-1980s. ULFA established ties with the Nationalist Socialist Council of Nagaland in 1983 and with the Burma-based Kachin Independent Army in 1987. Military operations against the ULFA by the Indian Army began in 1990 and continue to this day. On 5 December 2009, the chairman and the military operation commander of ULFA were taken into Indian custody. In 2011, there was a major crackdown on ULFA in Bangladesh under the previous regime of Awami League, which greatly assisted the government of India in bringing ULFA leaders to talks. In January 2010, a portion of ULFA softened its stance and dropped demands for independence as a condition for talks with the Government of India.

On 3 September 2011, a tripartite agreement for "Suspension of Operations" agreement was signed by the Indian government, the Assam government and the ULFA.

== History ==
The ULFA was founded in courtyard of historic amphitheatre–Rang Ghar on 7 April 1979 in Sivasagar, Assam by a group of young men that included Bhupen Borgohain, Bhimkanta Buragohain, Tarun Gogoi, Pradip Gogoi, Bhadreshwar Gohain and Budheswar Gogoi. The organisation's purpose was to engage in an armed struggle to form a separate independent state of Assam.

During its peak days in the late 80s and 90s, it had support among many of the Assamese people of the Brahmaputra valley. The majority of the supporters felt that a powerful organization was necessary to get the voice of a peripheral region heard, to the central government. But gradually, the organisation's emphasis on illegal means and smuggling of weapons in the name of furthering the 'revolution' led to violence throughout the state. It witnessed a period marked by growing disillusionment and anger amid supporters.

In the conflict, many civilians were killed and several thousand were permanently maimed and displaced. It is estimated that more than 10 thousand local youths were killed and disappeared during that period. In the process, owing to the twin factors of increasing operations by the security forces and dwindling support among its core sympathisers, ULFA's importance in Assam has been declined drastically.

Recruiting for the front did not begin until 1983. Soon after it finished recruitment in 1984, it began to seek out training and arms procurement from other groups such as the Kachin Independence Army (KIA) and the Nationalist Socialist Council of Nagaland (NSCN). In 1986, it launched a fundraising campaign across India. It then began to set up camps in Tinsukia and Dibrugarh but was soon declared a terrorist organization by the government on 7 November, under the Unlawful Activities (Prevention) Act.

In less than a decade of its formation, the ULFA emerged as one of the most powerful insurgent outfits in Southeast Asia, largely because of the immense popularity, it enjoyed during the first decade of its struggle as well as its economic power which in turn helped it in bolstering its military capabilities. In the early 1990s, ULFA launched an armed campaign against Indian forces, political opponents, and blasted rail links. In July 1991, the front captured and held 14 people for ransom, included in the abductees was an engineer and a national of the Soviet Union. From the 1990s, the ULFA have continued to carry out attacks.

Till the late 2000s, it maintained a number of camps in Bangladesh, where members were trained and sheltered away from Indian security forces. In April 2004, Bangladesh police and Bangladesh Coast Guard intercepted massive amounts of illegal arms and ammunition at Chittagong, being loaded into 10 trucks. A total of 50 were charged with arms smuggling and arms offenses, including former high-level Bangladesh political appointees including ministers of the Bangladesh Nationalist Party and Bangladesh Jamaat-e-Islami and NSI military officers, as well as prominent businessmen, and Paresh Baruah, the chief of ULFA who was then living in Dhaka. He later fled the country.

They had also maintained camps in Bhutan, which were destroyed during Operation All Clear by the Royal Bhutan Army aided by the Special Frontier Force in December 2003. These camps housed combatants and non-combatant families of ULFA members.

ULFA maintained close relationships with other separatist organisations like NDFB, KLO and NSCN (Khaplang).

In 2008, News Services reported citing Indian police and intelligence officials reported ULFA's commander-in-chief Paresh Baruah had taken refuge in Yunnan Province of China, along China-Myanmar border, due to continued losses incured to his organization. The report also stated that a group of militants had also taken refuge along with him. Paresh Baruah had previously visited China in the 1980s. In December 2003, China spurned ULFA's chairman Arabinda Rajkhowa appeal to provide safe passage to the rebels from Bhutan.

On 13 July 2025, ULFA(I) claimed that the Indian Army launched drone attacks on camps in Sagaing Region, Myanmar. Indian officials denied knowledge of any cross-border operations recently targeting ULFA(I).

== Faction ==
In 2011, ULFA split into Pro-talk faction under Arabinda Rajkhowa and Anti-talk faction under Paresh Baruah and reemerged as ULFA-I (independent). The Pro-talk faction consisting of 533 cadres and leaders disbanded in conclusion of peace treaty in 2023. As of 2020, the Anti-talk faction of ULFA-I which is still active has an estimated cadre strength of 1000+ cadres based in four camps in Myanmar.

=== Disbandment of Pro-truce Faction ===
On 23 January 2024 the Pro-truce fraction led by Chairman Arabinda Rajkhowa and military leader Raju Baruah was disbanded.

== Organizational structure ==
During the 1990s and 2000s, the total strength of ULFA was stated to be around 3,000, while various other sources put the figure ranging from 4,000 to 6,000. A military wing of the ULFA, the Sanjukta Mukti Fouj (SMF) was formed on 16 March 1996.

SMF had formed three full-fledged so-called battalions: the 7th, 28th, and the 709th. While remaining battalions exist only on paper at best they have the strengths of a company or so. Their allocated spheres of operation are as follows:

- 7th Bn (HQ-Sukhini) is responsible for defence of General Headquarters (GHQ).
- 8th Bn – Nagaon, Morigaon, Karbi Anglong
- 9th Bn – Golaghat, Jorhat, Sivasagar
- 11th Bn – Kamrup, Nalbari
- 27th Bn – Barpeta, Bongaigaon, Kokrajhar
- 28th Bn – Tinsukia, Dibrugarh
- 709th Bn – Kalikhola

=== Command Structure ===
Name	Self-Styled Designation	Current Status
Arabinda Rajkhowa	Chairman	Captured, Released on bail
Pradip Gogoi	Vice-chairman	Captured, Released on bail
Ashanta Baghphukan	Vice-chairman/organizing secretary	Missing since 2003
Anup Chetia	General secretary	Deported to India from Bangladesh.
Paresh Baruah	Commander-in-Chief	Wanted
Heerak Jyoti Mahanta	First Deputy Commander-in-Chief	Killed under custody on 31 December 1991.
Raju Baruah	Operation Commander	Captured, Released on bail
Michael Deka Phukan	Present Deputy Commander-in-Chief	Wanted
Mithinga Daimary	Publicity Secretary	Captured, Released on bail
Chitraban Hazarika	Finance Secretary	Captured, Released on bail
Pranati Deka	Cultural Secretary	Captured, Released on bail
Sashadhar Choudhury	Foreign Secretary	Captured, Released on bail

== Secret killings of the family members of militants ==
During the second government of AGP leader Prafulla Kumar Mahanta, as a part of his government's counter-insurgency strategy, unidentified gunmen had assassinated a number of family members of ULFA leaders. With the fall of this government following elections in 2001, the secret killings stopped. Dinesh Barua, the elder brother of Paresh Barua, was taken from his house at night by unidentified Assamese men, Later his body was found lying near a cremation center in Chabua. ULFA's self-styled Publicity Secretary, Mithinga Daimary, also had his five family members killed during this period.

Government investigations into the killings culminated in the report of the "Saikia Commission", presented to the Assam Assembly on 15 November 2007. The report describes how the killings were organised by Prafulla Mahanta, then the Assam Home Minister. They were executed by the police. The gunmen were former members of ULFA who had surrendered to the government. They approached their targets at home, at night, knocking on the door and speaking in Assamese to allay suspicion. When the victims answered the door, they were shot or kidnapped to be shot elsewhere.

== Enigma Force ==
Enigma Force
- Active: Disbanded
- Branch: ULFA
- Type: Guerrilla
- Role: Shock troops
- Garrison/HQ: Bhutan

Commanders
- Current Chief: None
- 1st Chief: Raju Baruah

Enigma Force or Enigma Group was an exclusive and near autonomous striking group of the ULFA. It is known to a few top leaders of the outfit and the cadres were isolated from the others. It was designed for hit and run type of operations. It was headed by the Raju Baruah.

== Activities ==
On 10 May 1985, some ULFA activist robbed Silpukhri branch branch of UCO Bank and killed the branch manager Girish Goswami.

On 1 March 1986, a few ULFA activist robbed more than ₹40 million (US$430,000) Namrup branch of State Bank of India. The bank robbery created a chaos and following a heavy gunfight between ULFA and Assam police. The gunfight killed Officer-in-Charge of Namrup police station, injuring four policemen and three civilian.

On 29 July 1990, the Superintendent of Police (SP) of the Dibrugarh district Daulat Singh Negi (IPS) and his PSO and driver were killed by an ambush in Lahoal of Dibrugarh district by the ULFA.

Some of the major assassinations by ULFA include that of Surendra Paul in May 1990, the brother of businessman Lord Swraj Paul, that precipitated a situation leading to the sacking of the Government of Assam under Prafulla Kumar Mahanta and the beginning of Operation Bajrang.

In 1991, a Russian engineer, and national of the Soviet Union was kidnapped along with others and killed. In 1997, Sanjay Ghose, a social activist and a relative of a high-ranking Indian diplomat, was kidnapped and killed. The highest government officer assassinated by the group was local Asom Gana Parishad minister Nagen Sarma in 2000. An unsuccessful assassination attempt was made on AGP Chief Minister Prafulla Kumar Mahanta in 1997. A mass grave, discovered at a destroyed ULFA camp in Lakhipathar forest, showed evidence of executions committed by ULFA.

In August 1995, it killed eight SF personnel. In November a joint ambush by ULFA and BDSF killed five security personnel.

In 1996, ULFA killed 13 SF personnel in three separate attacks.

In 2003, the ULFA was accused of killing labourers from Bihar in response to an alleged molestation of a Mizo girl in a train passing through Bihar. This incident sparked off anti-Bihari sentiment in Assam and ULFA saw it as an opportunity to regain its lost ground. The ULFA killed civilians of Bihari origin and other outsiders of mainland India.

In 2003, during a Railways Recruitment Board Examination for Group (D) posts conducted by Northeast Frontier Railway zone a wing of Indian Railways, a good number of candidates from Bihar and other states were beaten up and stopped from taking the exam by some elements who were seeking 100 percent reservations for unemployed indigenous Assamese people in the said test.

In resentment, conflicts arose with train passengers from North Eastern Indians states passing through some of the stations like Katihar, Jamalpur, Kishanganj in Bihar.

During that period ULFA was already losing its popularity and ground across many pockets in Assam where it had strongholds. However, ULFA took this situation as an opportunity to fan an opposition against 'India' among people in Assam. They started killing Hindi-speaking people mostly having origin in Bihar in the State.

On 15 August 2004, an explosion occurred in Dhemaji District of Assam in which 13 people died, mainly women and school children. This explosion was carried out by ULFA. The ULFA has obliquely accepted responsibility for the blast and tendered public apology for it in a statement issued by Paresh Baruah in 2009.

In January 2007, the ULFA once again struck in Assam killing approximately 62 Hindi-speaking migrant workers mostly from Bihar. ULFA notoriety as a directionless and unpopular organisation increased, as the bomb blast victims also included several indigenous Assamese people.

On 15 March 2007, ULFA triggered a blast in Guwahati, injuring six people as it celebrated its 'army day'.

The Central Government made a tough response, forcing a dreaded group of ULFA – 28 Battalion to unilaterally bow down and seek asylum from the government. This particular one-sided ceasefire broke the backbone of ULFA.

In June 2010, in an IED blast claimed by ULFA at Goalpara, killed five CRPF jawans and injured 33.

In November 2017, in a joint attack by ULFA-NSCN (K), it ambushed and killed 3 jawans and injured 4 at Pengeri area of Tinsukia District.

=== Political activities ===
After 1985 and before it was banned in 1990, ULFA was credited in the media with many public activities. It has continued a public discourse of sorts through the local media (newspapers), occasionally publishing its position on political issues centred around the nationality question. It has participated in public debates with public figures from Assam. During the last two local elections, the ULFA had called for boycotts. Media reports suggest that it used its forces to intimidate activists and supporters of the then-ruling parties (Congress and AGP respectively).

=== Economic subversion ===
The ULFA has claimed responsibility for bombings of economic targets like crude oil pipelines, freight trains and government buildings, including a 7 August 2005 attack on oil pipelines in Assam. ULFA carried out a bombing and destruction of a five million-liter petrol reservoir at Digboi refinery in Tinsukia, with an estimated property loss of 200 million rupees. On the same day, they also damaged a gas pipeline in the oil district of Tinsukia.

=== Recruitment ===
In the initial years of the ULFA movement, cadres were recruited from rural areas as well as from many towns in Lower Assam, Northern and Upper Assam and middle Assam districts. One of the most popular ULFA leaders of all time, the late Heerak Jyoti Mahanta hailed from a place which is just a few kilometres from Guwahati. However, with the educated Assamese urban middle class becoming increasingly sceptical of ULFA's method of functioning, the ULFA targeted the remote villages and the predominantly backward areas of predominantly marginalised indigenous communities for recruitment. According to intelligence sources, the Paresh Baruah faction of the Ulfa, which have been continuously raising its voice against the ongoing peace process being initiated by the Arabinda Rajkhowa faction, is engaged in a massive recruitment drive in the rural areas of Dibrugarh, Tinsukia, Sivasagar, Lakhimpur and Nalbari districts of Assam. The Ulfa also has strong following among the Naga people in Assam.

=== Duns collection ===
The ULFA is credited with some bank robberies during its initial stages. Now it is widely reported to extort businessmen, bureaucrats and politicians for collecting funds. In 1997, the Chief Minister of Assam accused Tata Tea of paying the medical bills of the ULFA cultural secretary Pranati Deka at a Mumbai hospital.

== Bans ==
The Government of India banned the organisation and designated it as a terrorist organisation in 1990, while the United States Department of State lists it under "other groups of concern".

== Peace negotiations and surrender ==
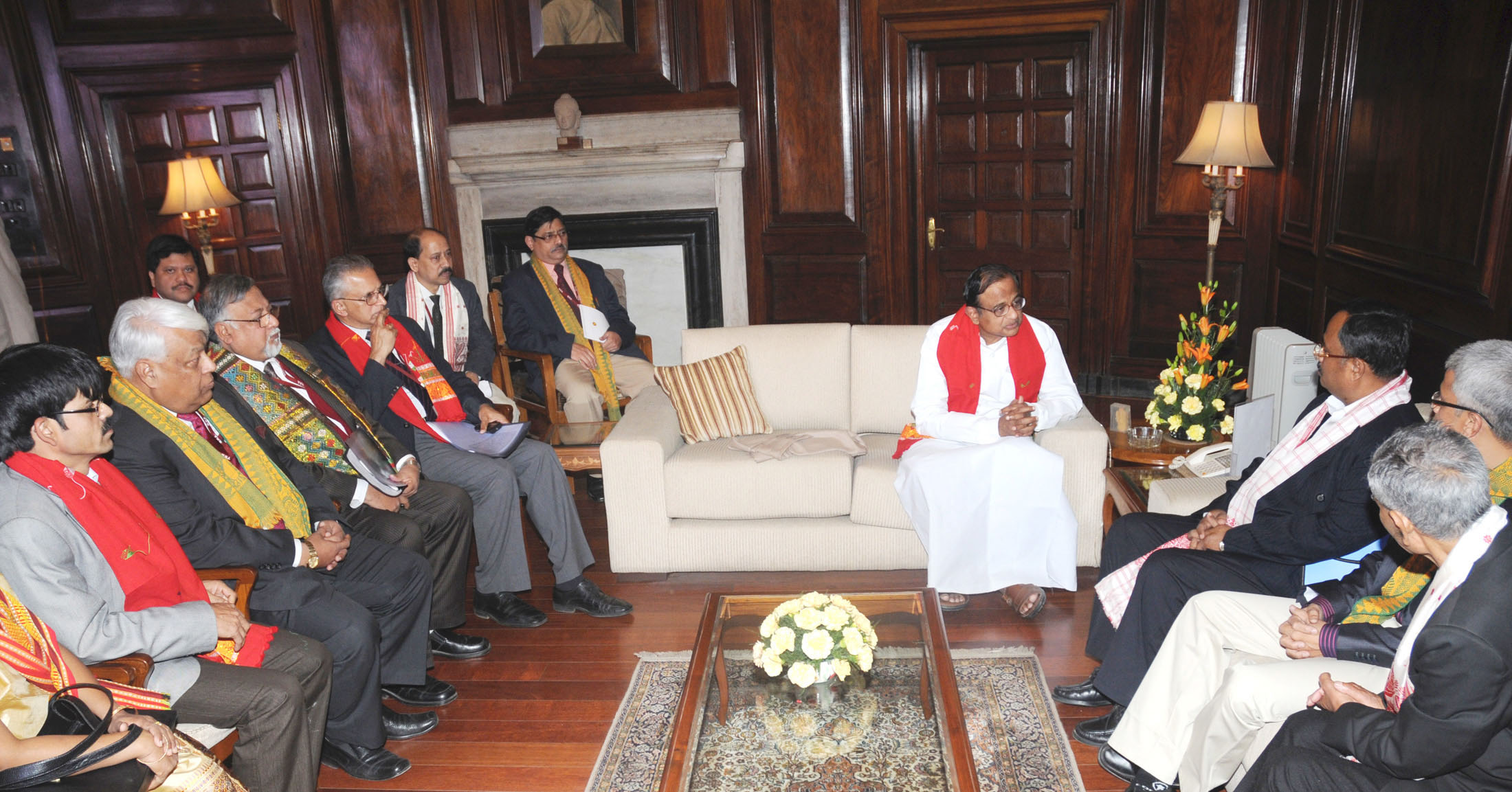
The Union Home Minister, P. Chidambaram meeting with the ULFA Leaders, in New Delhi.

Beginning in 1990, the Government of India has attempted to weaken away members of the ULFA. This occurred due to the death of the ULFA's deputy Commander in chief Heerak Jyoti Mahanta on 31 December 1991. He had opposed surrenders, but they began after his death. The group has been meeting more local opposition as residents are tired of the violence and disruption, and some energy has gone out of the movement.

In 1992, a large section of second-rung leaders and members surrendered to government authorities. These former members were allowed to retain their weapons to defend against their former colleagues; they were offered bank loans without any liabilities to help them re-integrate into society. This loose group, now called SULFA, has become an important element in the armed politics and business of Assam.

The total number of ULFA militants to have laid down arms has gone up to 8,718. 4,993 cadres surrendered between 1991 and 1998. 3,435 surrendered between 1998 and 2005, when a new policy to deal with the ULFA was unveiled. On 24 January 2012, one of northeast India's biggest surrender ceremonies took place in Assam's main city of Guwahati, when a total of 676 militants laid down their weapons. In 2020, 1,675 militants of ULFA(I) and allied militant groups surrendered.

In 2003, ULFA had put forward a set of three preconditions for talks and negotiations with the Indian government. Thought government had rejected these preconditions. The preconditions were:

1. The talks should be held in a third country.
2. The talks should be held under United Nations supervision.
3. The agenda of the talks should include the independence of Assam.

Despite dropping the first two key preconditions in 2004 and expressing readiness for talks, the United Liberation Front of Asom (ULFA) faced an Indian government unwilling to negotiate on sovereignty. However, progress emerged when ULFA formed the "People's Consultative Group" (PCG) in September 2005, aiming to pave the way for negotiations. The government welcomed this initiative. Following sustained army operations in Dibru-Saikhowa National Park, ULFA suffered significant losses in leadership, personnel, and infrastructure, prompting their return to the negotiating table in 2005. According to The Times of India, initial talks occurred at Prime Minister Manmohan Singh's residence in December 2005. Three rounds of peace talks with the 11-member PCG, led by Assamese writer Indira Goswami, resulted in a temporary truce in August 2006. However, the truce collapsed by September 23 due to ULFA's resumption of violent activities against civilians, primarily targeting tea estates and oil pipelines. They also violated the ceasefire by attacking army columns.

On 24 June 2008, some leaders and cadres of the A and C companies of ULFA declared unilateral ceasefire at a press meet held at Amarpur in Tinsukia district. They declared the ceasefire to pressure the top brass of ULFA to sit on negotiation table with the Government of India. But the top brass of ULFA expelled the leaders of 28 Battalion led by Mrinal Hazarika and Jiten Dutta (who had managed to escape from the cordon of Indian Army in Dibru Saikhowa National Park). The group later renamed as ULFA (Pro-talk).

Lt Bijoy Chinese alias Bijoy Das, Commander of 28th Battalion also surrendered to state authorities in 2013.

Between 2009 and 2018, entire leadership of ULFA was either Captured or surrendered to the government thus leading to disbanding of the all ULFA battalions, besides only part of 27th battalion renamed as Kapili Gut remained. Currently, there are no commanders other than Paresh Baruah. All the others have been downgraded to staff and workers. As per the leaders of the insurgent group, the crackdown against Indian insurgent groups by the Awami league government in Bangladesh pushed them towards joining peace talks with the Indian government in 2011.

In December 2023, a peace accord was signed by the Government of India, the Assamese government and the pro-talks faction of ULFA, led by Arabinda Rajkhowa. This resulted in the disbandment of ULFA, the vacating of all designated camps, and the surrender of 8,200 cadres. The accord carried a Rs 1.5 lakh crore financial package, which includes setting up of an IIM and an IISER, new railway and national highways in the state. Paresh Barua, leader of the anti-talks faction of the ULFA, termed the tripartite peace agreement signed with the pro-talks faction of the outfit as 'shameful' and was unwilling to come to the negotiating table unless the issue of 'Assam's sovereignty' is discussed.

The ULFA(I) faction who is not part of the peace deal, which has around 200 members are still active in their camps in Myanmar.

== Links to China ==
The leftover faction of ULFA has been using China for shelter following expulsion from both Myanmar and Bangladesh. ULFA's commander-in-chief, Paresh Baruah, has taken refuge in Yunnan, China. He is also receives funding and patronage from the Chinese Ministry of State Security.

== See also ==
- Operation Bajrang
- Insurgency in Northeast India
- People's Consultative Group
- Sanjukta Mukti Fouj
- List of terrorist organisations in India
- Secret killings of Assam
- List of top ULFA leaders

== Footnotes ==
- Nath, Sunil. "Assam: The Secessionist Insurgency and the Freedom of Minds". Faultlines. 13. South Asia Terrorism Portal.
