= Sanjukta Mukti Fouj =

- Abbreviation: SMF
- Formation: March 16, 1996
- Type: Guerrilla
- Legal status: Outlawed
- Location: Assam
- Region served: Assam
- Official language: Assamese, English
- Parent organization: ULFA

Sanjukta Mukti Fouj (SMF) (Assamese: সংযুক্ত মুক্তি ফৌজ) is the military wing of the banned outfit ULFA in Assam, India. It was formed on March 16, 1996, and it has three full-fledged battalions – the 7th, 28th and 709th with allocated spheres of operation in HQ- Sukhni, Tinsukia/Dibrugarh and Kalikhota respectively. The rest of the battalions are said to exist only on papers.

== Battalions ==
This is a list of the battalions along with their allocated operation spheres.

Name	Led by	Company	Spheres of Operation
7th Battalion	Tapan Baruah		HQ - Sukhni
8th Battalion			Nagaon; Morigaon; Karbi Anglong
9th Battalion			Golaghat; Jorhat; Sibsagar
11th Battalion			Kamrup; Nalbari
27th Battalion	Pradip Gohain		Barpeta; Bongaigaon; Kokrajhar
28th Battalion	Tapan Baruah; Mrinal Hazarika; Prabal Neog; Bijay Chinese	Alpha, Bravo & Charlie	Tinsukia; Dibrugarh; Sivasagar
109th Battalion	Laleswar Rabha Gulit Das Drishti Rajkhowa		
709th Battalion	Heera Saraniya		Kalikhola

== Ceasefire of 28th Battalion ==
On June 24, 2008, the A and C companies of ULFA's 28th battalion offered unilateral ceasefire and renamed themselves as “ULFA (Pro-Talk)”. This battalion is considered as the backbone of the outfit.

== See also ==
- ULFA
- SULFA
- Bhomita Talukdar
