= List of Assamese periodicals =

Part of a series on

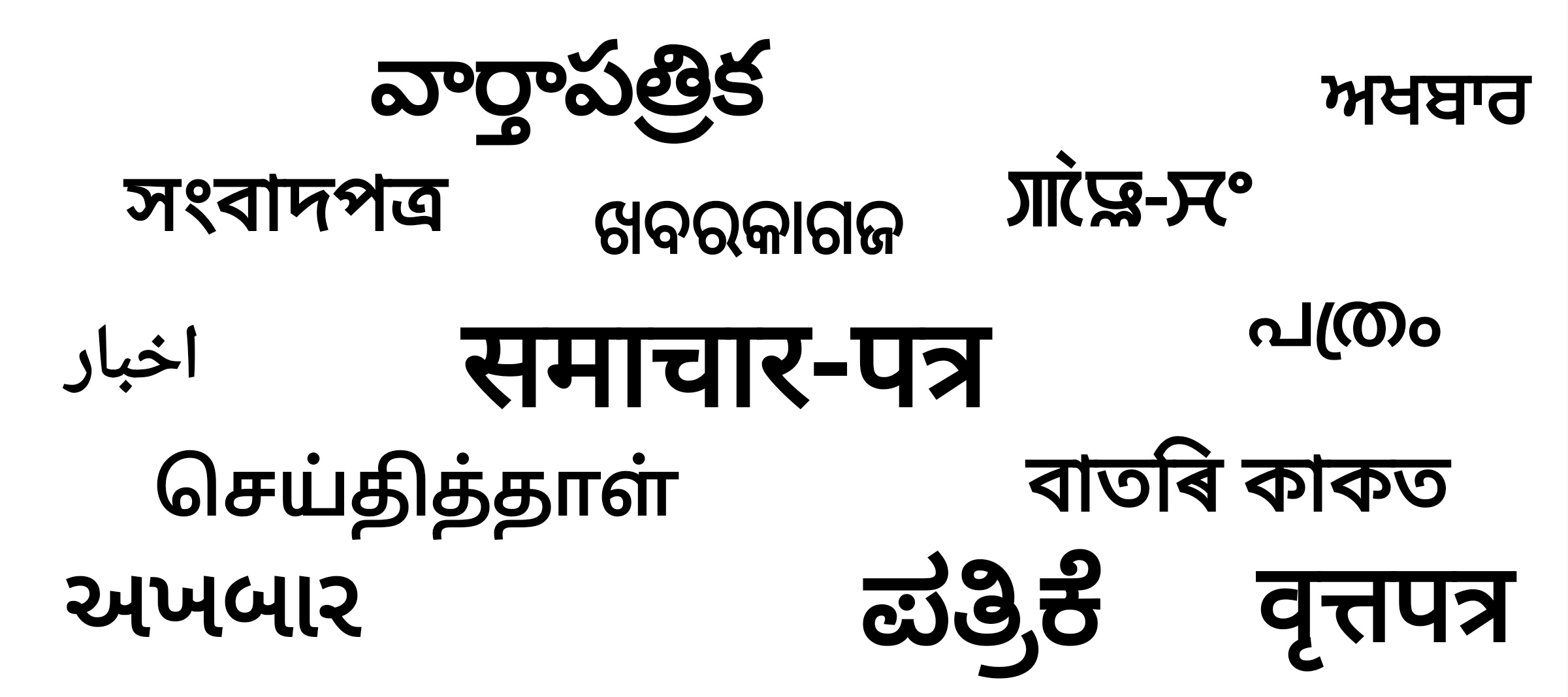

Newspapers of India
Category
Newspapers by languages
- Assamese
- Bengali
- Gujarati
- Hindi
- Kannada
- Malayalam
- Marathi
- Meitei (Manipuri)
- Punjabi
- Tamil
- Telugu
Related
- Newspapers by readership
- Registrar of Newspapers for India
- The Indian Newspaper Society

== Assamese newspapers ==
Newspaper name		Founded	Owner/Publisher	Editor	Region	Refs.
English	Assamese	Founded	Owner/Publisher	Editor	Region	Refs.
Niyomiya Barta	নিয়মীয়া বাৰ্তা	2011	Pride East Entertainment Pvt.Ltd.	Naresh Kalita	Regional	
Dainik Janambhumi	দৈনিক জনমভূমি	1972	Janambhumi Group of Publications	Utpal Baruah	Regional	
Dainik Agradoot	দৈনিক অগ্ৰদূত		Agradoot Publishers Pvt. Ltd.	Kanak Sen Deka	Regional	
Asomiya Pratidin	অসমীয়া প্ৰতিদিন	1995	Jayanta Baruah	Jayanta Baruah	Regional	
Dainik Asam	দৈনিক অসম	1965	The Assam Tribune	Prafulla Govinda Baruah	Regional	
Asomiya Khabar	অসমীয়া খবৰ	2001	Frontier Publication Pvt. Ltd	Biswajit Das	Regional	
Amar Asom	আমাৰ অসম	1995	G. L. Publications Ltd.	Manoj Kumar Goswami	Regional	
Dainik Gana Adhikar	দৈনিক গণ অধিকাৰ	1994	Unity Media & Infrastructure Limited	Dr. Zakir Hussain	Regional	
Janasadharan	জনসাধাৰণ	2003	Dr. Khargeswar Bhuyan	Dr. Khargeswar Bhuyan	Regional	

== Assamese magazines ==
=== Literary magazines ===
- Assam Sahitya Sabha Patrika
- Goriyoshi
- Prantik

=== Popular entertainment journals ===
- Bismoi
- Roopkar
