= List of journalists killed in Assam =

Journalists killed in Assam

This is a list of journalists killed in Assam. Since 1987, 23 editors, correspondents and reporters were killed in Assam.

Name	Media	Designation	Base	Killed by	Killed at	Year	Image
Punarmal Agarwala	The Assam Tribune	Correspondent	Kampur Town	ULFA	Kampur Town	1987	
Kamala Saikia	Ajir Asom	Local Correspondent	Sibsagar	ULFA	Sibsagar	9 August 1991	
Pabitra Narayan	The North East Times	Correspondent	Sibsagar	Suspected timber smugglers	Sonari, Sibsagar	19 August 1995	
Dipak Swargiary		Journalist	Goreswar	Unidentified miscreants		24 September 1995	
Manik Deuri		Journalist	Goreswar	BLT	Diphu	26 April 1996	
Parag Kumar Das	Asomiya Pratidin	Executive Editor	Guwahati	SULFA	Guwahati	17 May 1996	
Panja Ali		Local journalist		Unidentified miscreants	Kasugaon, Kokrajhar	1997	
Nurul Hoque		Local journalist		Suspected mafia	Hojai, Nagaon	1998	
Alfarid Shazad		Photographer		Grenade explosion	Inside Sivasagar SP's office	1999	
Jiten Sutiya		Journalist		Grenade explosion	Inside Sivasagar SP's office	1999	
Ratneswar Sarma Shastri		Senior journalist		ULFA	Barpeta	31 December 1999	
Dinesh Brahma		Journalist		Assassin	Dhubri	24 March 2003	
Indramohan Hakasama	Amar Asom	Local correspondent			Agia, Goalpara	2003	
Prahlad Gowala	Asomiya Khabar	Correspondent			Golaghat	6 January 2005	
Kanak Raj Medhi		Journalist	Sualkuchi	Died under mysterious circumstances		29 October 2006	
Mohammad Muslimuddin		Journalist	Hojai			2007	
Bodosa Narzary	Bodoland TV	Director		Suspected former BLT and BPF youth wing members	Bhabanipur, Kokrajhar	1 April 2007	
Jagajit Saikia	Amar Asom	Correspondent	Kokrajhar		Kokrajhar	22 November 2008	
Anil Mazumdar	Aji	Executive Editor		Unidentified gunman	Rajgarh, Guwahati	24 March 2009	
Bimala Prasad Talukdar	Swatantra Awaj	Editor			Hojai	4 September 2010	
Rayhanu Naime	Gana Chabuk, Deshbarta	Journalist	Dhubri	Unidentified miscreants	Dhubri, Dhubri	8 September 2012	
