= Parag Kumar Das =

Indian newspaper editor

- Portrait of Parag Kumar Das
- Born: 24 February 1961; Shillong, India
- Died: 17 May 1996 (aged 35); Guwahati, Assam, India
- Cause of death: Killed by SULFA
- Other name: Buman
- Education: Master's Degree in Economics
- Alma mater: Cotton College, St. Stephen's College, Delhi School of Economics; Delhi University
- Occupations: Journalist; Newspaper Editor; Human rights activist
- Notable credit: Amnesty International
- Spouse: Purabi Das
- Children: 2
- Parents: Durgadhar Das (father); Anupama Das (mother)

Parag Kumar Das was a former editor of Asomiya Pratidin, a journalist, human rights activist, and one of the founders of the human rights movement in Assam.

Parag Kumar Das was also the founder and leader of the human rights NGO Manab Adhikar Sangram Samiti (MASS).

Before that Parag Kumar Das was the manager of Guwahati Stock Exchange.

Parag Kumar Das was assassinated by SULFA in 1996.

Das had his education at St. Stephen's College and Delhi School of Economics, Delhi.

== Early life ==
Parag Kumar Das was born in Shillong on 24 February 1961. He did his lower primary, primary, and high schooling at Chenikuthi Boys School, M.C.M.E. School, and Cotton Collegiate Government H.S. School respectively. In 1977, he got the 4th position in the HSLC examination. He also got 4th position in the Pre-university examination from Cotton College in the Science stream. Then he moved to Delhi for higher education. He was admitted to St. Stephen's College for his graduation in Economics. After that, he joined the Delhi School of Economics at the University of Delhi for a master's degree.

In 1984, he joined as a manager in Punjab National Bank. After that, he was appointed as general manager in Unit Trust and Guwahati Stock Exchange. In 1995 he quit his job and joined as an editor in the Assamese daily Asomiya Pratidin.

He married Purabi Das, and they have two children.

== Journalism life ==
Parag Kumar Das started his journalism career with Prantik and The Sentinel (an English daily published from Guwahati, Assam) in the late 80s. Later, in 1989, Das launched Boodhbar (English: Wednesday), an Assamese weekly. In 1994, he launched another Assamese magazine Agaan (English: Steps).

Both Boodhbar and Agaan were stopped following his arrests. Finally, in 1995, he joined as the Executive Editor of Asomiya Pratidin, quitting his job at the Stock Exchange of Guwahati.

== Books ==
Parag Kumar Das' Books
Book	English	Assamese (Origin)
Rastradrohir Dinlipi	Diary of a State Rebel	ৰাষ্ট্ৰদ্ৰোহীৰ দিনলিপি
Swadhinataar Prostab	Proposal for Independence	স্বাধীনতাৰ প্ৰস্তাৱ
NISIDDHA KALAM ARU ANNYANYA	Banned writings and others	নিষিদ্ধ কলম আৰু অন্যান্য
Swadhin Axomor Arthaniti	Swadhin Axomor Arthaniti	স্বাধীন অসমৰ অৰ্থনীতি
Sanglat Fenla	Call for Independence	ছাংলট ফেনলা
Early Writings of Parag Kumar Das	Early Writings of Parag Kumar Das	No

== Assassination ==
In the afternoon of 17 May 1996, while taking back his young son from school in Chandmari, Guwahati, Das was assassinated in broad daylight by four SULFA members - Mridul Phukan alias Samar Kakati, Diganta Baruah, Tapan Dutta alias Biswajit Saikia and Nayan Das alias Guli. His open murder created huge outrage in the entire state of Assam and the human rights circles of the country.

== International condemnation on assassination ==
Several international human rights forums and journalist forums condemned the brutal killing of Parag Kumar Das. Amnesty International, on its note, stated, "...The killing of Parag Das highlights the suppression of human rights activity within Assam, where human rights violations and abuses have been committed with virtual impunity by both security forces and armed opposition groups."

Human Rights Watch stated, "...death of Assamese activist Parag Das in May exposed the security forces, use of irregular militias to carry out abuses...".

== Trial and judgement controversy ==
In 2001, CBI filed its chargesheet in Kamrup District and Sessions Court against the four accused - all members of the surrendered group of ULFA. Before the CBI filed its chargesheet, Diganta Baruah and Tapan Dutta were killed in 1998 and 1999, and in 2003 Nayan Das was hacked to death by a furious mob in Dibrugarh. Promod Gogoi and Prabin Sarma, two other suspects were not charge-sheeted for lack of evidence against them. Mridul Phukan is the only surviving accused in the case. But after thirteen years, on 28 July 2009, Justice Dilip Kumar Mahanta, District and Sessions Judge, Kamrup, acquitted the prime accused citing the lack of solid evidence.

The acquittal of Mridul Phukan, the lone survivor of the accused in Parag Kumar Das's killing, sparked criticism of judgement and investigation done by the Central Bureau of Investigation. Ajit Kumar Bhuyan, the then editor of Asomiya Pratidin, of which the late Das was executive editor, said, "The judgment (by the Kamrup Metro District and Sessions Court) has exposed the hollowness of our inquiry and law system".

== MASS reactions ==
According to human rights activists, the key witnesses were not interviewed, some were intimidated, and related materials were tempered to ensure the acquittal of the accused and cover up the state machinery's role in the case. Three of the accused were expired. The human rights activists, media, friends, and family members of Das, call it a betrayal of the CBI and the Court. MASS leader Lachit Bordoloi, expressing his disappointment with the verdict, said that the MASS would approach higher courts and continue the fight for justice for the slain activist.

== Parag Kumar Das Memorial Trust ==
The Parag Kumar Das Memorial Trust was formed after his death by the family members and the well-wishers. The trust has been organizing an annual debate competition at the state level since 1997. In 2021, the silver jubilee edition of the debate will be organized and from 2022 onward annual memorial lectures will replace the debate competition.

A documentary on Late Das sponsored by the trust was also released on 24 February 2018 on the occasion of his Birthday and is available on YouTube.

== See also ==
- Parag Kumar Das' Books in Amazon
- Asomiya Pratidin
- Manab Adhikar Sangram Samiti
- List of journalists killed in Assam
