= Dainik Asam =

Indian newspaper

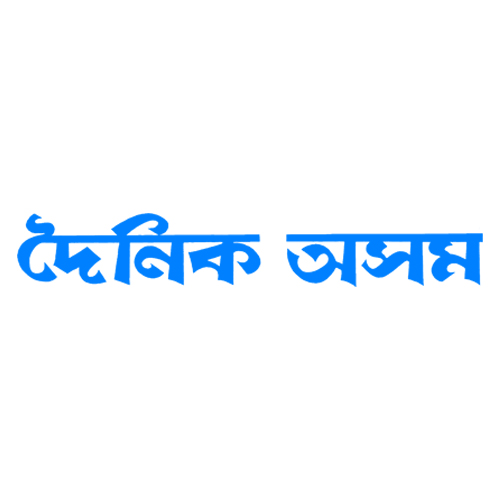
- Type: Private
- Format: Broadsheet
- Owner: Kishore Bora
- Editor: Sankar Laskar
- Founded: 4 August 1965
- Language: Assamese
- Headquarters: Guwahati, Assam
- Sister newspapers: The Assam Tribune
- Website: dainikasam.in

Dainik Asam (Assamese: দৈনিক অসম, romanized: The Daily Assam) is one of the oldest daily Assamese-language newspaper running to date. It was first published on 4 August 1965. This newspaper was one of the outcomes of the honest efforts of the late Radha Govinda Baruah. It is published from Guwahati and Dibrugarh. It also has an internet version. The internet version was unveiled on 1 January 2012.

In 2025 the Assamese weekly publication 'Asom Bani', published by the Assam Tribune Group, merged with Dainik Asom as a Friday supplement before its quiet closure. The ND 24 Group took over the ownership of the historic Assamese daily newspaper Dainik Asom from The Assam Tribune Group in September 2025.

== See also ==
- Amar Asom
- Asomiya Khabar
- Asomiya Pratidin
- Dainik Janambhumi
