= Satish Chandra Kakati =

Indian journalist, writer and editor

- Born: October 1912; Ulabori, Nalbari district, Assam, India
- Died: 20 June 2006 (aged 93); Guwahati, Assam, India
- Occupations: Journalist; Writer; Freedom activist
- Known for: The Assam Tribune
- Awards: Padma Shri; Kanaklata Barua and Mukunda Kakati Memorial Award; Lokapriya Gopinath Bardoloi Memorial Award

Satish Chandra Kakati was an Indian journalist, writer, the editor of The Assam Tribune, an Assam based English-language daily, and one of the founders of Assam Bani, a vernacular weekly started in 1955 by The Assam Tribune group. He was the vice president of the Editors' Guild of India and authored seven books in Assamese and English. A 2005 recipient of the Kanaklata Barua and Mukunda Kakati Memorial Award, Kakati was awarded the fourth highest civilian award of the Padma Shri by the Government of India in 1991.

== Biography ==
Kakati was born at Ulabori, a small hamlet in Nalbari district, in the Northeast Indian state of Assam, in October 1912 and did his schooling at The Kamrup Academy, a school born out of nationalistic movement in Assam. His graduate studies were at the Cotton College, Guwahati when he was attracted towards the freedom movement in India and due to his involvement in the Civil disobedience movement and agitation against the Cunningham Circular issued by J. R. Cunningham, then director of Public Instruction, which banned student involvement in Swadeshi movement, he had to endure incarceration for three months. He was also involved in the student movements and was one of the founder secretaries of the Assam University League, which agitated for a separate university for Assam.

His career started as the founder headmaster of the Gangapukhuri High School in 1936 but he moved to his alma mater, the Kamrup Academy, as the assistant head master in 1948. During his academic days, he was associated with Hindustan Standard, Anandabazar Patrika and the Press Trust of India as a reporter. Later he had a stint as a government servant, as the Assistant Publicity Officer, where he stayed till he got associated with Radha Govinda Baruah who invited him to join The Assam Tribune in 1952 as its assistant editor. When the Group started Asom Bani, an Assamese language weekly in 1955, he became its founder editor. He stayed there till his superannuation in 1976, becoming the Editor of the Group publications in 1963.

Kakati was a regular contributor to other publications and continued his social activism after his retirement. He was a columnist for The Statesman He served as a visiting faculty at the Guwahati University for some time. He was involved in the organizational activities of Assam Media Trust, and served as the vice president of the Editors' Guild of India. He authored seven books, in both English and Assamese languages and Jivanimala, Jawaharlal Nehru Aru Soviet Russia and Smriti Bichitra are some of his notable works. Months before his death, a book on his life and times was released, in 2005, on the occasion of his 94th birth anniversary. Kakati died on 20 June 2006 at Guwahati.

== Honours ==
The Government of India awarded him the civilian honour of the Padma Shri in 1991. He received the Lokapriya Gopinath Bardoloi Memorial Award from the Government of Assam in 2004. A year later, he was awarded the Kanaklata Barua and Mukunda Kakati Memorial Award.

== See also ==
- Civil disobedience movement
- Swadeshi movement
- Radha Govinda Baruah
- The Assam Tribune
