= People's Consultative Group =

Citizen's group in Assam, India

People’s Consultative Group
- Abbreviation: PCG
- Formation: September 8, 2005
- Dissolved: February 2011
- Type: Citizens’ Group
- Purpose: Initiating peace talk-process between ULFA and the Centre
- Location: Assam, India
- Region served: Assam, India
- Members: Selected by ULFA
- Official language: Assamese, English
- Chief Interlocutor: Mamoni Raisom Goswami
- Parent organization: ULFA
- Staff: 11

The People's Consultative Group (PCG) was a citizen's group in Assam, India, comprising 11 members and established by the United Liberation Front of Assam (ULFA) on September 8, 2005. Its objective was to initiate the peace talks process as mediator between the central government and ULFA. The PCG was dissolved by ULFA chairman Arabinda Rajkhowa in February 2011. ULFA continued the peace talks without the PCG on 10 February 2011 in New Delhi.

== Members ==
The following is a list of PCG members released by ULFA chairman Arabinda Rajkhowa. Mamoni Raisom Goswami was appointed as the chief interlocutor between the ULFA and the government. Some of its members are believed to be ULFA sympathizers or ex-ULFA cadres.

1. Mamoni Raisom Goswami (Jnanpith Awardee writer)
2. Reboti Phukan (Former footballer and childhood friend of Paresh Baruah)
3. Arup Borborah (Lawyer)
4. Lachit Bordoloi (MASS leader)
5. Mukul Mahanta (Engineer)
6. Ajit Bhuyan (Editor, Aji)
7. Haider Hussain (Editor, Asomiya Pratidin)
8. Diganta Konwar (Ex Auditor, Advocate)
9. Brajen Gogoi (Doctor)
10. Dilip Patgiri (Adviser to the Asom Jatiyatabadi Yuba Chatra Parishad)
11. Hiranya Saikia (Sports organiser)

== Reactions ==
P. V. Sumant, the Director-General of Police in Assam, welcomed the move but made it clear that police operations would continue since no ceasefire agreement existed. Though he considered it a laudable step, he expressed concern that terror organizations are known to make similar overtures to buy time. The state government also agreed to facilitate the peace talk process but denied any unilateral ceasefire with the outfit.

== Activities ==
On September 11, 2005, three days after its formation, the PCG launched a statewide opinion-sharing campaign through letters, SMS, fax and email. It adopted two further resolutions during its first sitting. It appealed to the Chief Minister, Tarun Gogoi to expedite the peace process. It also expressed concern over Director-General Sumant's remarks that police operations would continue with regard to ULFA. On November 5, 2005, at a rally in Nalbari, the group launched a campaign seeking an immediate end to army counter-insurgency operations.

== The talk process ==
The future of the talk process became uncertain when state security forces killed 12 ULFA cadres on September 14, 2005, in upper Assam, using mortars and other explosives. Paresh Baruah, the commander-in-chief of the armed wing of ULFA, reportedly said, ‘‘We will be compelled to call off the peace initiative because of the state’s attitude. While we took a major step by forming a PCG to work out the modalities of the talks with the government, what the state has done is nothing but sheer betrayal’’. The PCG held an emergency meeting in Guwahati taking note of the security force's operation and also threatened to call off the peace process if such operations were not stopped.

== Present status ==
Declared unconstitutional by ULFA leadership, the PCG was dissolved in the first week of February 2011 by ULFA leaders, led by Arabinda Rajkhowa.

== See also ==
- Asom Sena
- Sanjukta Mukti Fouj
