= Mithinga Daimary =

Poet and ULFA rebel

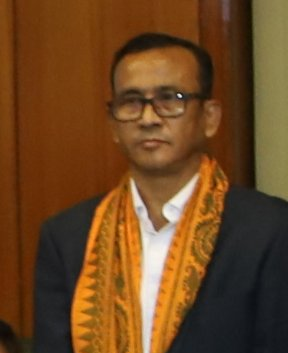
- Daimary in 2023
- Born: Deepak Kachari; 17 May 1967 (age 59); Niz Juluki, Baksa, Assam
- Other names: Deepak Das, Megon Kachari
- Status: Released on Parol

Mithinga Daimary (alias Deepak Das) was the Central Publicity Secretary of the banned outfit ULFA since the previous publicity secretary Siddhartha Phukan's surrender in 1992. He was born in the Barama village in Nalbari district of Assam on 17 May 1967 with the birth name Deepak Kachari.

== Education ==
Daimary joined B. Borooah College in Guwahati in 1986. But he could not complete his graduation since he joined ULFA in the same year and went underground. Later he became the Central Publicity Secretary of the outfit.

== Arrest ==
He was captured by the Royal Bhutan Army during the Operation All Clear in December 2003. He was handed over by Bhutan to the Indian Army who in turn handed him over to Assam Police on 20 December 2003. ‘‘I will not surrender before the government and will fight to the end,’’ said Daimary in a show of defiance when produced before the Chief Judicial Magistrate of Nalbari. He further said that the Bhutanese operation was quite unexpected. He has now been released from jail for peace talks between the Government of India and the ULFA. Apurba Baruah became his successor after his arrest.

== Poetry ==
Daimary wrote poetry under the pseudonym Megan Kachari and has three collections of it. In 2006, the World Book Fair in Frankfurt released an English translation of some of his poems. Melodies and Guns (ISBN 9788174765802)) is a collection of his poems published by UBSPD in response to the efforts taken by Jnanpith Awardee Mamoni Raisom Goswami. Memsaheb Prithivi is the collection of his Assamese poetry now translated into English as "Melodies and Guns" by Pradeep Acharya and Manjeet Baruah. The preface of the book is written by Dr Goswami herself. He has been writing poetry since even before he joined ULFA in the 1980s. "While at the camp, he had a few birds as pets. On the night of the crackdown, when everyone was fleeing, he wanted to take them with him. On finding them asleep, he waited for them to wake up, but it was too late," said Dr Mamoni Raisom Goswami.

== Poetry Collections ==
- Memsaheb Prithivi
- Rupor Nakfuli Sunor Kharu
- Melodies and Guns (Translated into English)

== Family Assassination ==
In 2000 his entire family - mother, elder brother, sister and pregnant sister-in-law – was assassinated by unidentified gunman which is said to be a part of the secret killings of Assam that then AGP government allegedly carried out.

== See also ==
- List of top leaders of ULFA
- Melodies and Guns
- Operation All Clear
- People's Consultative Group
- Sanjukta Mukti Fouj
