= Niyomiya Barta =

Indian daily newspaper

- The Assamese Daily
- Type: Daily newspaper
- Format: Broadsheet
- Owner: Pride East Entertainment Private Limited
- Publisher: Pride East Entertainment Pvt.Ltd.
- Editor: Naresh Kalita
- Founded: 2011
- Language: Assamese
- Headquarters: Guwahati, Assam
- Website: http://www.niyomiyabarta.com/

Niyomiya Barta (Assamese: নিয়মীয়া বাৰ্তা, lit. 'Regular Messages') is an Indian Assamese language daily newspaper. The newspaper was launched on 4 March 2011. It is published simultaneously from Guwahati, Dibrugarh, Biswanath Chariali and Goalpara of Assam. Niyomiya Barta is owned and published by Pride East Entertainment Private Limited.

The head office of this newspaper is located at News Live Building, Christian Basti, Guwahati.

== See also ==
- Dainik Janambhumi
- Asomiya Pratidin
- Amar Asom
- Asomiya Khabar
