= Sunil Nath =

SULFA member

Sunil Nath, alias Siddhartha Phukan, is SULFA leader, and was a former Central Publicity Secretary and spokesman of the United Liberation Front of Assam (ULFA). He had been holding the post to 1992 after the death of Uddipta Hazarika when the ULFA was at its peak. The charge was later taken over by Mithinga Daimary. Now he is a columnist and the editor of the Assamese daily Asomiya Khabar and e-journal Voice of Assam. He writes on insurgency and development issues related to Assam in several newspapers and academic journals within and outside the state.

== Surrender ==
On March 31, 1992, Nath came overground and surrendered to then chief minister of Assam Hiteswar Saikia. He led the first batch of the outfit to surrender.

== See also ==
- People's Consultative Group
- List of top leaders of ULFA
- Sanjukta Mukti Fouj
