= Bordoloi =

Bordoloi is one of the surnames used among the Assamese Brahmins, Kalitas, Tiwas, Chutias of Assam. Notable people with the surname include:

- Gopinath Bordoloi, Indian politician
- Lachit Bordoloi, Indian writer
- Nirmal Prabha Bordoloi, Indian poet
- Nishanta Bordoloi, Indian cricketer
- Padmanav Bordoloi, Indian musician
- Pradyut Bordoloi, Indian politician
- Rajanikanta Bordoloi, Indian writer
- Robin Bordoloi, Indian politician

== See also ==
- Lokpriya Gopinath Bordoloi International Airport
- Bordoloi Trophy
