= Asom Sonmilito Morcha =

Political coalition in India

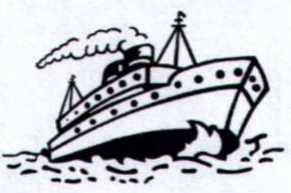
- অসম সন্মিলিত মৰ্চা Asom Sonmilito Morcha
- Abbreviation: ASM
- President: Ajit Kumar Bhuyan (AJP)
- Chairman: Gaurav Gogoi
- Secretary: Lurinjyoti Gogoi (AJP)
- Lok Sabha Leader: Gaurav Gogoi
- Founded: 2025
- Headquarters: Rajiv Bhawan, GS Road, Guwahati, Assam
- Ideology: Anti-CAA; Constitutionalism; Anti-authoritarianism; Social Populism
- Political position: Big Tent
- Seats in Rajya Sabha: 0 / 7
- Seats in Lok Sabha: 2 / 14
- Seats in Assam Legislative Assembly: 19 / 126

Asom Sonmilito Morcha (ASM) is a coalition of political parties in the northeastern state of Assam in India. It is the major political alliance in Assam and currently the opposition in Assam Legislative Assembly. The alliance is led by Indian National Congress along with several other political parties. Most of the ASM constituents are members of the Indian National Congress-led Indian National Developmental Inclusive Alliance at pan-India level.

== History & Elections ==
Ten political parties formed a political alliance in the run-up to the 2021 Assam Legislative Assembly election. But only eight of them including Indian National Congress, All India United Democratic Front, Bodoland People's Front, Communist Party of India (Marxist), Communist Party of India, Communist Party of India (Marxist–Leninist) Liberation, Anchalik Gana Morcha and Rashtriya Janata Dal agreed on a seat-sharing arrangement for dethroning the incumbent BJP government. The alliance was unable to defeat the BJP and its allies, but it gained 43.68% of the total votes polled and got 50 seats.

After the election, Bodoland People's Front left the alliance and All India United Democratic Front was expelled by Indian National Congress.

Due to disagreement on seat sharing for Assam Legislative Assembly by-polls in 2024, the opposition parties went ahead, excluding the Indian National Congress.

In November 2025, Indian National Congress and seven other parties formed a new alliance ahead of the 2026 Assam election.

Later on, ahead of 2026 Assam Legislative Assembly election, Raijor Dal left the alliance. However, Raijor Dal rejoined the alliance later and the seat sharing was finalised the same day. On the other hand, Communist Party of India (CPI) decided to contest alone in the polls without entering into any formal alliance but the party says it will extend its full support to the alliance without formally joining it.

The alliance was unable to defeat the BJP and its allies, and it won just 21 seats with the Congress itself winning an all time low of 19. The alliance also got 35.95% of the vote, a sharp decline from its 2021 performance.

Later in 2026, the Raijor Dal was expelled from the alliance, reducing the alliance's strength in the assembly to 19.

== Current Members ==
Party	Flag	Ideology	State Leaders
Indian National Congress		Indian Liberalism	Gaurav Gogoi
Assam Jatiya Parishad		Regionalism	Lurinjyoti Gogoi
Communist Party of India (Marxist)		Marxism–Leninism	Suprakash Talukdar
Communist Party of India (Marxist–Leninist) Liberation		Marxism–Leninism	Bibek Das
All Party Hill Leaders Conference		Regionalism	Jonas Engti Kathar

== Election results ==
=== Results of State Assembly election in Assam ===
Election Year	Overall Votes	% of overall votes	Total seats	Seats won	+/- in seats	+/- in vote share
2026	7,789,996	35.95	126	21	▼29	▼7.73 pp

== Presidents ==
=== President ===
The president coordinates with the members of currently four membered panel of General Secretaries.

No.	Name	Date of appointment	Date of retirement	Party
1	Ripun Bora	15 March 2021	24 July 2021	INC
2	Bhupen Kumar Borah	24 July 2021	23 October 2024	INC
3	Ajit Kumar Bhuyan	25 October 2024	Till date	AJP

== Working Presidents & General Secretaries ==
No.	Posts	Name	Tenure	Party
1	Working Presidents	Suprakash Talukdar	25-Oct-2024 to 12 Nov 2025	Communist Party of India (Marxist)
2	Working Presidents	Jonas Ingti Kathar	25-Oct-2024-Incumbent	All Party Hill Leaders Conference
1	General Secretary	Lurinjyoti Gogoi	Incumbent	Assam Jatiya Parishad

== Past members ==
	Year	Party	State Leaders	Remarks
1	2021	All India United Democratic Front	Badruddin Ajmal	Expelled
2	2021	Bodoland People's Front	Hagrama Mohilary	Left the alliance, later joined NDA
3	2022	Jimochayan Deori People’s Party	Mahesh Deori	Left the alliance to join NDA
4	2024	Janata Dal (United)	Paresh Nath	Left the alliance to join NDA
5	2024	Trinamool Congress	Sushmita Dev	Left the alliance
6	2026	Raijor Dal	Akhil Gogoi	Expelled

== See also ==
- Secular Democratic Front
