= Dharitri Terangpi =

Indian biker and activist (born 1996)

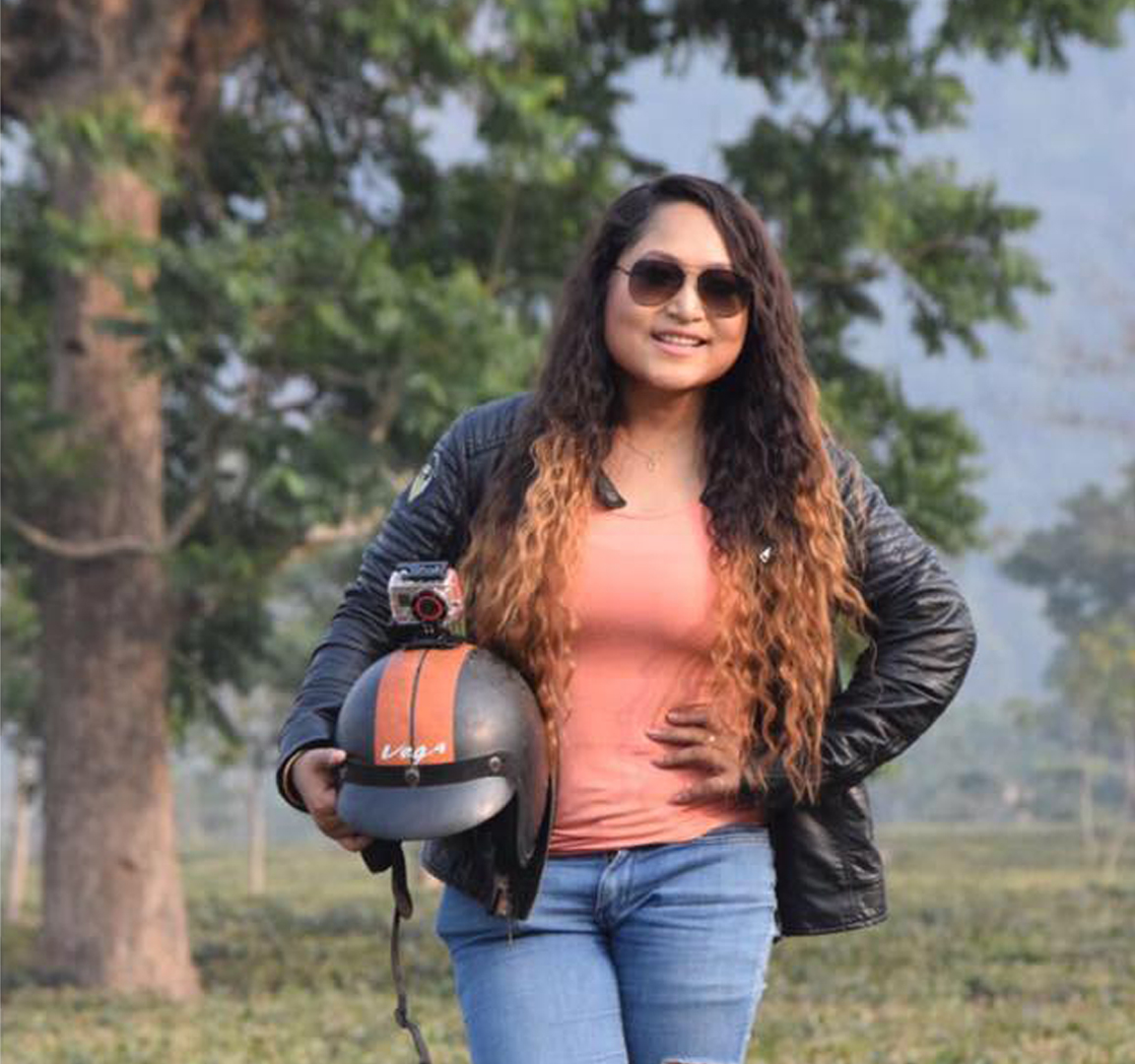
- Born: 24 February 1996 (age 30); Guwahati, India
- Other name: Nirdhar
- Occupations: Social activist; motorcyclist; freelancer
- Years active: 2016–present
- Known for: First women-biker from Guwahati
- Political party: Independent
- Awards: Red FM Band Baaja Samman Award

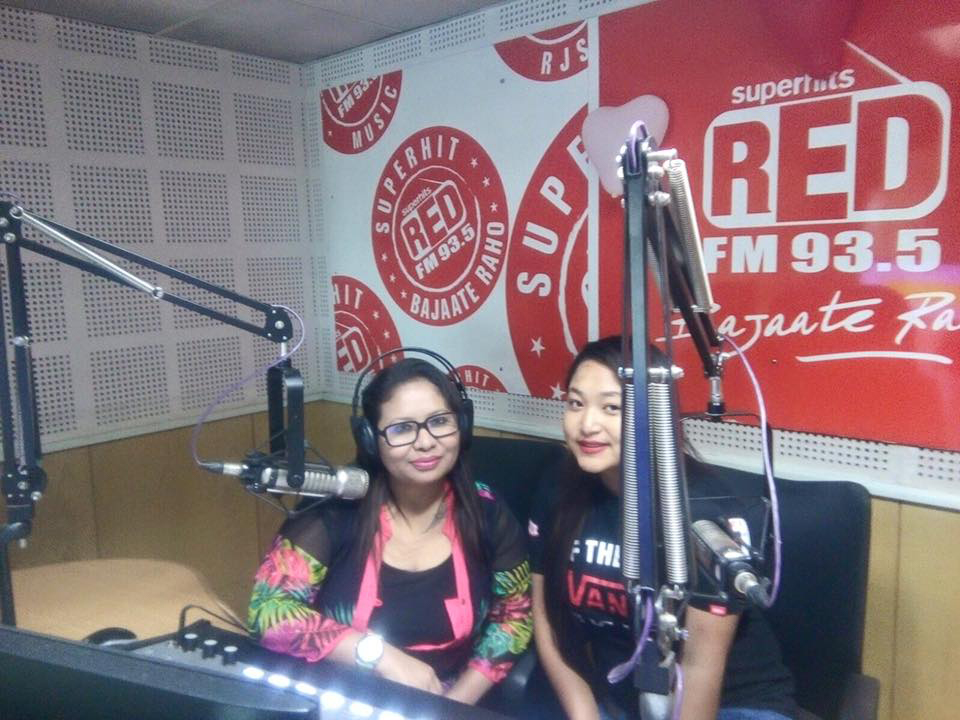
Terangpi during an interview on Red FM 93.5

Dharitri Terangpi (born 24 February 1996) better known as Babie and Nirdhar, is a woman Royal Enfield bullet biker from Guwahati, India. Terangpi is a competitive motorcyclist, long-distance rider and photographer. She is a member of the Assam Bikers, and has ridden from Guwahati to Delhi, a distance of more than 8,000 kilometres (5,000 mi). Terangpi believes in female empowerment, and is establishing an awareness campaign of safe riding among the biker groups of Northeast India.

== Early life ==
Terangpi was born on 24 February 1996. She formed a riding group named Niradhar, a backronym consisting the initials of the members' names. "Niradhar" means determination, and the group intend to inspire women to follow their passion.

== Achievements ==
Dharitri has covered 7,000 km (4,300 mi), traveling through eight Indian states. She is the first female rider from the Indian state of Assam to do so. Her top speed is 150 km/h (93 mph) on a bullet.

== Gallery ==
Achievements gallery

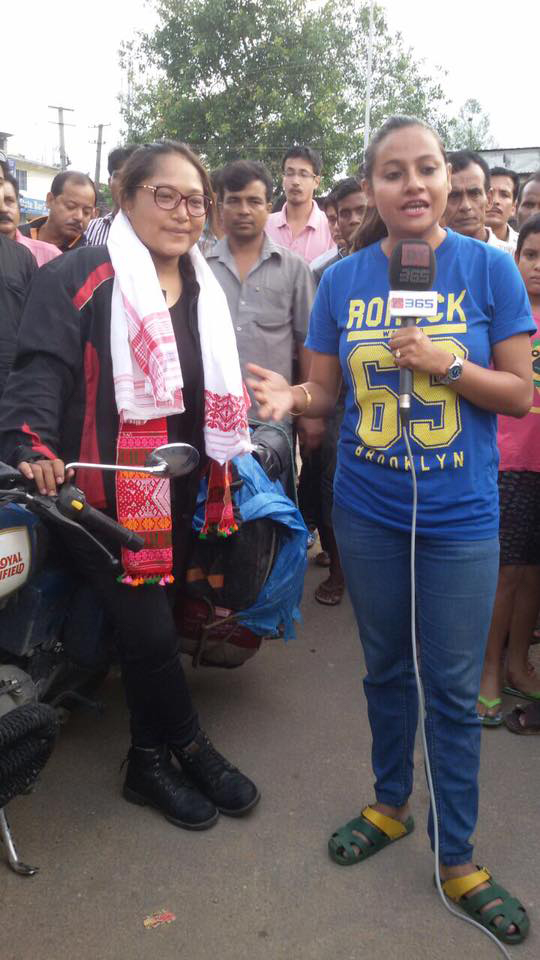
Terangpi interviewed by DY 365 News
