= Suprakash Talukdar =

Indian politician

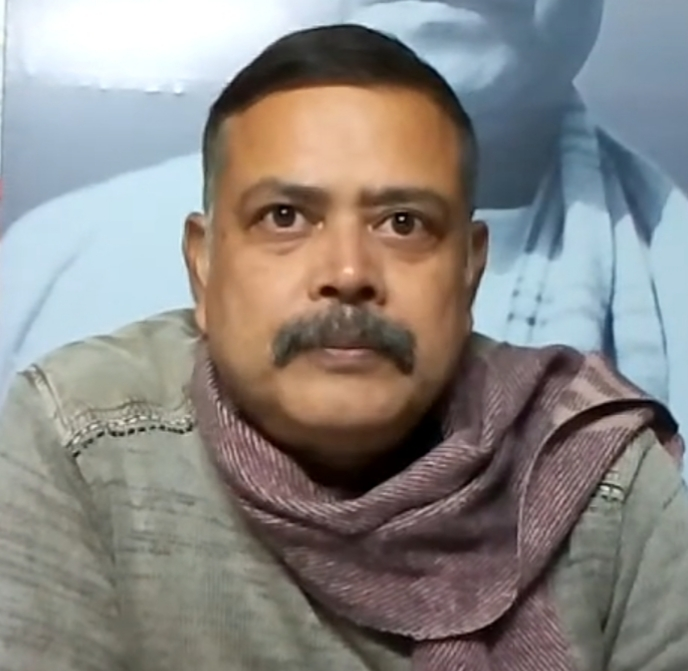

Member of Central Committee, Communist Party of India (Marxist)
- Incumbent
- Assumed office 22 April 2018

Secretary of Communist Party of India (Marxist), Assam
- Incumbent
- Assumed office 17 February 2022
- Preceded by: Deben Bhattacharya

Working President of Asom Sonmilito Morcha
- In office 25 October 2024 – 12 November 2025

Personal details
- Party: Communist Party of India (Marxist)
- Relatives: Nandeswar Talukdar (Father); Abhrakash Talukdar (Son)
- Occupation: Politician

Suprakash Talukdar is an Indian politician who currently serves as the state secretary of the Communist Party of India (Marxist) in Assam.

== Education and political career ==
Suprakash is the eldest son of Nandeswar Talukdar, a freedom fighter and prominent peasants leader who served as secretary of the Assam state committee of the CPM from 1982 to 1995. Having born in a left-leaning family, he got acquainted with left-wing ideologies from his childhood. He joined Students Federation of India, the student wing of CPIM while he was in Cotton Collegiate School in 1977. He studied geology from Cotton College which at that time was under Gauhati University. He was appointed the secretary of Assam state unit of SFI in 1992.

Later he was inducted into the state committee and the state secretariat of Assam CPI(M) in 1997.

He was elected to the Central Committee of the party at the end of 22nd Party Congress in Hyderabad on 22 April 2018. He held the post after the following Party Congress.

He was first elected as the state secretary of the party on 17 February 2022 in the last day of 23rd Assam state conference of CPI(M). There he placed the political and organisational report as the-then state secretary Deben Bhattacharya was absent in the conference for his illness. He got reelected to the post in the 24th conference as well.

He acts as the in-charge of CPM Manipur state unit on behalf of the Central Committee of the party. He also serves as the working president of Asom Sonmilito Morcha, the left-wing opposition alliance in Assam.

== Socio-political issues ==
He has been quite vocal against Citizenship (Amendment) Bill, 2016 and Citizenship (Amendment) Act, 2019 and wrote several articles against it and played an important role in uniting the left and democratic forces in the opposition of the bill.

He was also the member of Sitaram Yechury led delegation which visited the ethnic strife-torn Manipur for two days from 18 August 2023. The delegation also visited various relief camps at Churachandpur, Moirang and Imphal and met Governor Anusuiya Uikey and various other civil society organisations.
