= Kumud Chandra Hazarika =

Assamese Writer

Ranju Hazarika
- Born: 24 July 1952 (age 74); Sonitpur, Assam
- Occupation: Writer,
- Spouse(s): Pranita Hazarika, (1984 – present)
- Writing career
- Language: Assamese
- Years active: 1973–present
- Genres: Thriller, Social, Horror, Science Fiction, Children, Comedy, Adventure
- Notable works: Zulu, Eta Dip Satta Kabar, Uttar Phalguni
- Notable awards: Rahashya Samrat (2008); Prerana Bota (2008); Literary Award (2011)

Kumud Chandra Hazarika (born 24 July 1952), popularly known as Ranju Hazarika is an Indian writer. In last four decades he has written over 750 books in Assamese language in different genres like Thriller, Social, Horror, Science Fiction, Children, Comedy, Adventure and considered as one of the most beloved writers of Assam.

== Biography ==
=== Early life ===
Ranju Hazarika was born in an Assamese family in Sonitpur, formerly known as the Darrang district of Assam. He spent his childhood in the Monabari Tea Estate. Since childhood he had an inclination towards the literature and that eventually prompted him write few short stories and poems, those were published in some local newspapers and magazines. At the age of fifteen, he finished writing the manuscript of his first Novel Bahurupi, after appearing the Class 10 Board Exams.

=== First novel and beginning ===
Along with his studies, Hazarika started his first job as an Accountant in the Cooperative society of the Monabari Tea State. Then, he had the chance to work in NEFA and in the next decade he served as an employee in two different tea estates. During those periods, he made the full utilization of his leisure time and his first novel Bahurupi, that were published in 1973. Gradually, Hazarika started writing few other manuscripts of his famous novels like Klanta Surjyar Rashmi, Sandhan, Mayajaal, Duranta Dashyu, Nikhar Atithi, Eta Dip Satta Kabar, Gahin Banar Phool, Uttar Phalguni, Tamas Tapashya, Debajani etc. Initially he did not have any intention to publish them and dumped all the manuscripts of his novels in a tea box, which he names "A Dustbin of Stories & Novels of Ranju Hazarika".

=== Jobs and career as a writer ===
In 1982, he moved became involved in literature and became the editor of the Assamese Trishool magazine. In 1984, he shifted to Guwahati and joined as an editor in a new magazine named Sangket. Additionally, he started a new children's magazine at his own effort named "Kon Kon", but unfortunately they did not run for a long time. After more than a decade, he again worked as an editor in few famous Assamese magazines like Hiya, Taal and Kareng.

=== Marriage ===
In 1984, he shifted to Guwahati and married Pranita Hazarika. They have a daughter and a son.

=== Other interests ===
Other than writing novels, Hazarika is famous for writing Short Stories. Thousands of his short stories have been published in many Assamese Magazines like Bismoi, Rahashya, Trishool, Hiya, Mouchaak etc. He has been practicing Astrology since last 35 years, and has written 11 books on Astrology and Palmistry.

== Writing ==
=== Genres ===
The versatility of Hazarika's writing extends into many genres and subgenres. For example, his thriller novels can be farther categorized into few subgenres like mystery fiction, crime fiction, psychological thriller, detective thriller, socio-crime, legal thriller, comic thriller and romantic thriller, have the interesting components like abrupt changes, exhilarate feeling, dramatic traction, strong narration and use of active voices. In terms of his social novels, his perception and critic to the society, the humor and undeviating depiction, the narration of the hypocrisy of the society amuses the reader. His social novels can also be divided into romantic, tragic, family-based, melodrama, etc. Kalnta Surjyar Rashmi, Gahin Banar Phool, Zulu, Jantab, Prahari, Unmukta Aranya, Birohi Aranya are few of his creations, plotting the Forest Life into limelight. Hazarika can be recognized as one of pioneer writers in the horror genre in the Assamese literature. His expertise in narrating the G, etc. are popular among readers. He has written many novels and books in the Gothic fiction, terror, paranormal, children's, astrology, comedy, science fiction and adventure genres. He has written over 200 children's books.

=== Series of books ===
Hazarika has written over 110 books, that came in a series, popularly known as the Series of Books. Till now, he has written all those books into 11 group of series popularly known as Jason Series (24 books), Pawan Series (18 books), Nandan Series (7 books), Rohan Series (10 books), Jintan Series (7 books), Gun Fighter Series (3 books), Jitu Series (13 books), Ranjan Series (7 books), Valkan Series (14 books), Keron Series (3 books) and Trinayan Series (7 books). Few of characters from the series like Jason, Pawan, Nandan, Rohan, Jintan, Jitu, Ranjan, Valkan, Keron, Trinayan were very popular among the readers.

=== Autobiography ===
Hazarika wrote his Autobiography in two parts. The first part was Jibanar Phool Aru Kaint (Flowers and Thrones of Life) and the second part was Jibanar Saat Rang (Seven Colors of Life).

=== Real life experiences ===
As mentioned in his Autobiographies, Hazarika claims to have experienced many paranormal activities in his real life. They inspired him to write his first horror story named "Rahashyamayee Haat" (Mysterious Hand), published in Bismoi and other horror stories, and finally wrote his first horror novel named Sesh Rajanigandham (Last Morning), published in 1983.

=== Story research ===
Just before writing every novel, Hazarika prefers to make a detailed research about the location and all. Once, few mountaineers followed one of his novel named Mrityur Xital Porox (Cold Touch of Death), where Hazarika explained a detailed scenario about the Great Himalayas and the people who actually visited the Himalayas, confirmed that it was exactly the same that Hazarika mentioned in that novel. Ranju Hazarika never visited any foreign locations, but the way he explains about the scenes in his novels are all seems to be real.

=== Common characters ===
Ranju Hazarika induced few of fictional characters in many of his novels and those popular characters are Detective Debajit Phukan, Pabitra Lahkar, Scientist Amal Krishna Hazarika, Agent Ranjit, Agent Arindom etc.

== Awards ==
- Rahashya Samrat, 2008.
- Prerana Bota, 2008.
- Literary Award, 2011.
- Sahitya Unmesh Award, 2024

== Movies, plays and serials made based on his novels ==
=== Plays ===
So far, 11 of Hazarika's novels were performed as plays by mobile theater groups like Theater Bhagyadevi, Bordoisila Theatre, Pragjyotish Theartre, Hengul Theatre etc. .

Novel Name	Play Name	Published Year
Uttar Phalguni	Theater Bhagyodevi	1991
Sesh Praharar Khela	Bordoisila Theater	1996
Sesh Rajani	Bordoisila Theater	2001
Maajnixar Atithi	Mahadev Theatre	2001
Eta Dip Saata Kabar	Bordoisila Theater	2001
Aatangka	Theater Pragjyotish	2001
Eibar Kaar Paal	Meghdoot Theater	2001
Bipojyor Khel	Mukunda Theater	2001
Andharor Jaal	Theater Sonitkonwar	2001
Mur Apunjon	Bordoisila Theater	2001
Mrityubaan	Hengul Theater	2003

=== Movies ===
Ranju Hazarika's novel Zulu was published as 3D animated feature film in 2012. Aasene Kunuba Hiyat (2000) and Maya (2003) were two movies in Assamese language, based on his novels Uttar Phalguni and Narakar Phool respectively. Hazarika was appointed as the brand ambassador of the film Boroshi.

=== Rahashyar Bitchaku ===
In 2014, Film Division of India produced a documentary Rahashyar Bitchaku, based on his life of Ranju Hazarika, directed by Altaf Mazid. The documentary later received a "Golden Conch" international award.

=== Serials ===
A number of serials were made from his novels, telecast in Doordarshan and famous Prahelika Series in DY 365.

Name of the Serial	Name of the Novel	Language	Channel	Published Year
Surangar Majere	Surangar Majere	Assamese	Doordarshan	1993
Agnipath	Bikhubdha Bahni	Assamese	Doordarshan	1995
Operation Drugs	Padma Paragat Bish	Assamese	Doordarshan	1996
Jitu Nitur Abhijan	Jitu Series	Assamese	Doordarshan	1996
Mon Aranya	Mon Aranya	Assamese	Doordarshan	1996
Sanga Dil Priya	Hiya Hina Priya	Hindi	Doordarshan	1999
Stabdha Aranya	Stabdha Aranya	Assamese	Doordarshan	2004
Khudhar Patrot Bish	Khudhar Patrort Bish	Assamese	Doordarshan	2010
Trasta Prahar	Trasta Prahar	Assamese	Doordarshan	2010
Gahbarat Bandi Megh	Gahbarat Bandi Megh	Assamese	Doordarshan	2010
Kaalchakra	Kaalchakra	Assamese	Doordarshan	2010
Nixobdo Nixar Nayak	Nixobdo Nixar Nayak	Assamese	Doordarshan	2011
Swarna Mrigar Sandhanot	Swarna Mrigar Sandhanot	Assamese	Doordarshan	2011
Amrit Ke Piyale Me Jeher	Khudhar Patrot Bish	Hindi	Doordarshan	2012
Junakor Aarot Jui	Junakor Aarot Jui	Assamese	Doordarshan	2013
Sikar	Sikar	Assamese	DY 365	2016
Chaitanor Sesh Samay	Chaitanor Sesh Samay	Assamese	DY 365	2016
Raang Kukurar Daat	Raang Kukurar Daat	Assamese	DY 365	2016
Pangil Samay	Pangil Samay	Assamese	DY 365	2016
Gahbarat Bandi Megh	Gahbarat Bandi Megh	Assamese	DY 365	2016

== See also ==
- List of Indian writers
- Assamese literature
- History of Assamese literature
- Culture of Assam
