= Rongmon (Assamese comics) =

Rongmon Comics
- Frequency: Monthly
- Publisher: Malini Publications
- Founder: Ruman Bordoloi
- Founded: February 2005
- Country: India
- Language: Assamese
- Website: www.rongmoncomics.com

Rongmon (Assamese: ৰংমন) is a series of popular monthly comics from Assam, India published by Malini Publications. The series was created by Ruman Bordoloi. Rongmon is known as the first Assamese language comic book series to be printed in colour.

The first edition of the series was published in February 2005. On 16 July 2011, first edition of the comic was uploaded on its website.

== See also ==
- Mouchak (Assamese magazine)
- Tinkle
- List of Assamese periodicals
