= Janasadharan =

Daily newspaper

- Type: Daily newspaper
- Format: Broadsheet
- Owner: Dr. Khargeswar Bhuyan
- Publisher: Dr. Khargeswar Bhuyan
- Editor: Dr. Khargeswar Bhuyan
- Founded: 2003
- Political alignment: Left
- Language: Assamese
- Headquarters: Guwahati, Assam
- Website: janasadharan.com

Janasadharan (Assamese: জনসাধাৰণ, lit. 'The Public') is an Indian Assamese language daily newspaper. It began publication in 2003. As of 2011 the chief editor of this daily was Dr. Sivanath Barman, a retired physics professor and an Assamese scholar. The headquarters is at Guwahati, Assam. It is published simultaneously from Guwahati and Dibrugarh.

== See also ==
- Dainik Janambhumi
- Niyomiya Barta
- Assam Talks
