= Cotton University =

University in Guwahati, India

- Motto: Apramattena Veddhavyam
- Motto in English: Knowledge in any field
- Type: Public state university
- Established: 1901; 125 years ago (as Cotton College); 2017; 9 years ago (as Cotton University)
- Founder: Sir Henry Stedman Cotton
- Affiliations: UGC
- Chancellor: Governor of Assam
- Vice-Chancellor: Dr. Ramesh Ch. Deka
- Location: Guwahati, Assam, India; 26.1868°N 91.7476°E
- Campus: urban
- Acronym: CU
- Colors: Orange, Blue, Green
- Website: cottonuniversity.ac.in

Cotton University, formerly known as Cotton College, is a public state university located in Guwahati, Assam, India. It was established in 2017 by the provisions of an Act from the Assam Legislative Assembly which merged Cotton College State University and Cotton College. The university has progressed to become one of the top 200 institutions of the country (appearing on the list of 150–200 in the National Institutional Ranking Framework rank list in May 2020).

As of 2024, Cotton University is ranked 373rd in the NIRF

Cotton College was established in 1901 by Sir Henry Stedman Cotton, chief commissioner of the former British province of Assam. It was the oldest institute of higher education in Assam and all of Northeast India. Cotton College became a constituent college of Gauhati University in 1948, and then of Cotton College State University when it was established in 2011, by an Act (Act XIX of 2011) of the Assam Government. The Cotton University Act, 2017, was enacted to resolve problems between the college and the university.

== Accreditation ==
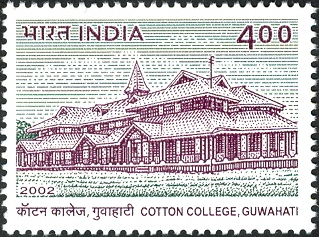
A 2002 stamp dedicated to Cotton University

Cotton University, then Cotton College, was accredited with an "A++" grade and a cumulative grade point average (CGPA) of 3.76 on a four-point scale by the 18th SC Executive Committee of the National Assessment and Accreditation Council (NAAC) on 5 November 2016, reflecting high institutional quality. As of 6 September 2024, the university's accreditation status was revised to an "A" grade with a CGPA of 3.05 on a seven-point scale.

== History ==
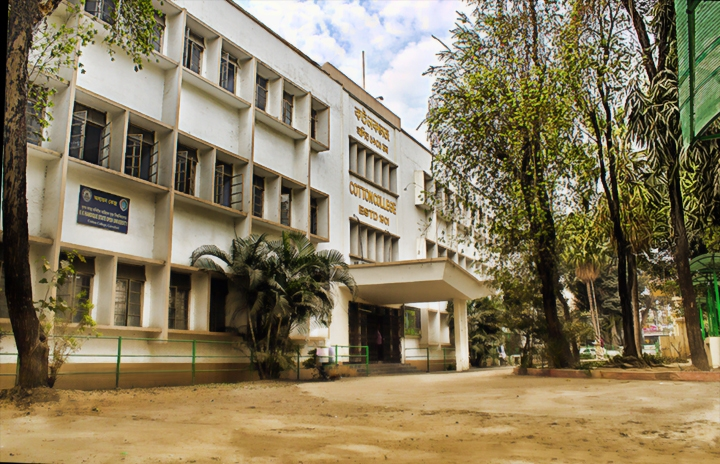
Main structure of the University

In 1899, Manik Chandra Baruah wrote to the British government asking to open a college in Guwahati, in so far as Assam was the only province with no college and that Guwahati was the most convenient location. In response, Sir Henry Stedman Cotton, K.C.S.I., then the Chief Commissioner of Assam, announced on 3 November 1899 that a college would be opened in Guwahati. Cotton College, named by the public, was inaugurated on 27 May 1901 by Cotton himself. Before 1948, It was affiliated with Calcutta University and began with five professors which included Frederick William Sudmerson, the first principal of the college, and 39 students.

The college was the centre of the freedom movement as well as literary and cultural movements of the state, which aimed to build Assam's identity as a distinct, integral component of India. When Gauhati University was established in 1948, Cotton College became affiliated with it as a constituent college. In 2015, the college was declared a Special Heritage College.

On 16 October 1992, the college was named as a center of excellence, an occasion celebrated in a solemn ceremony with Shankar Dayal Sharma, then President of India, and it officially became a post-graduate college.

=== Cotton College State University ===
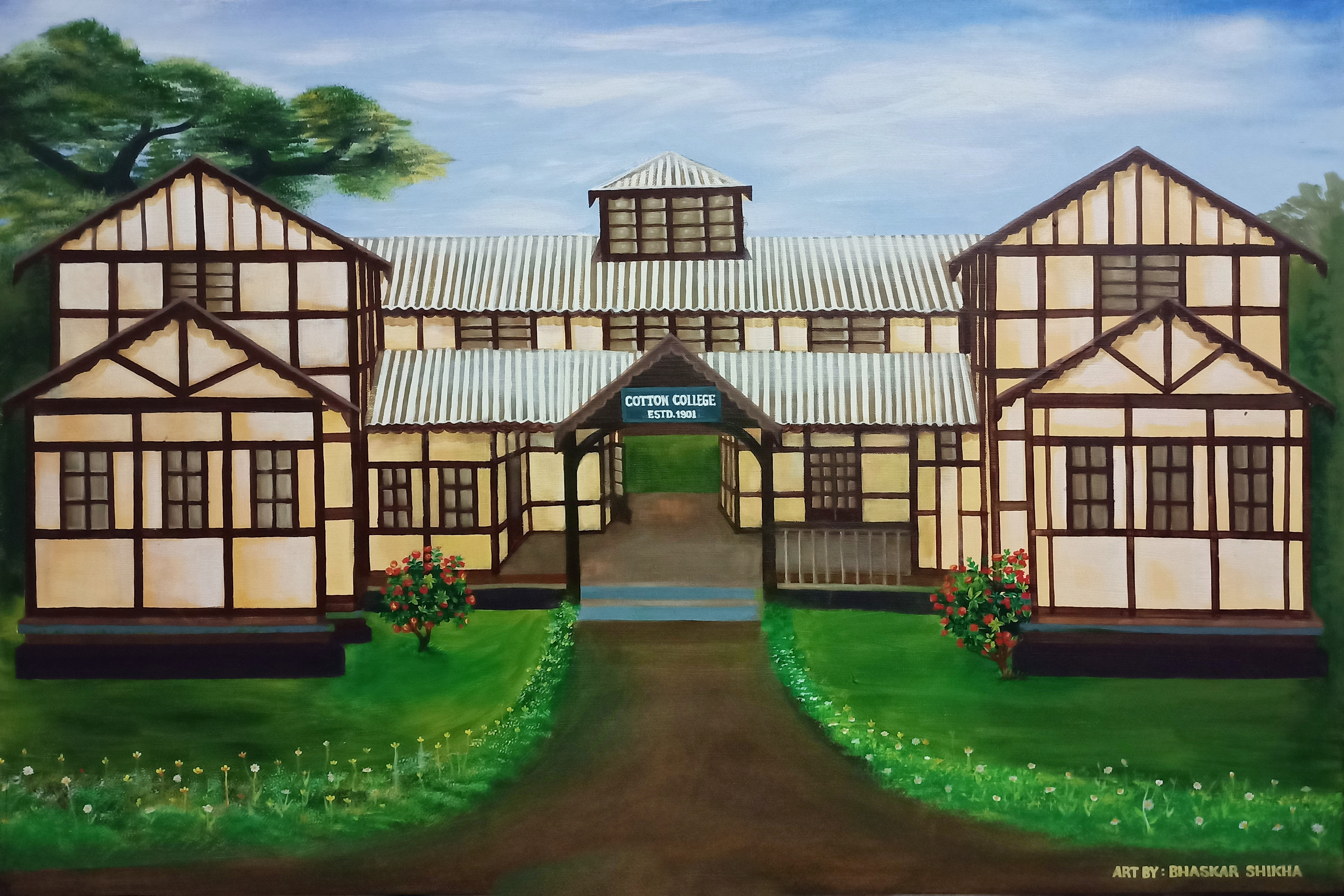
First Block of Cotton College

Cotton College State University was created through an Act of the Government of Assam (Act XIX of 2011). This act received the assent of the Governor of Assam on 3 September 2011, published in the Assam Gazette on 5 September 2011. The Cotton College became its constituent college.

The election for the university's first Academic Council and University Court was held on 22 February 2013 with three and five members elected respectively.

=== Cotton University ===
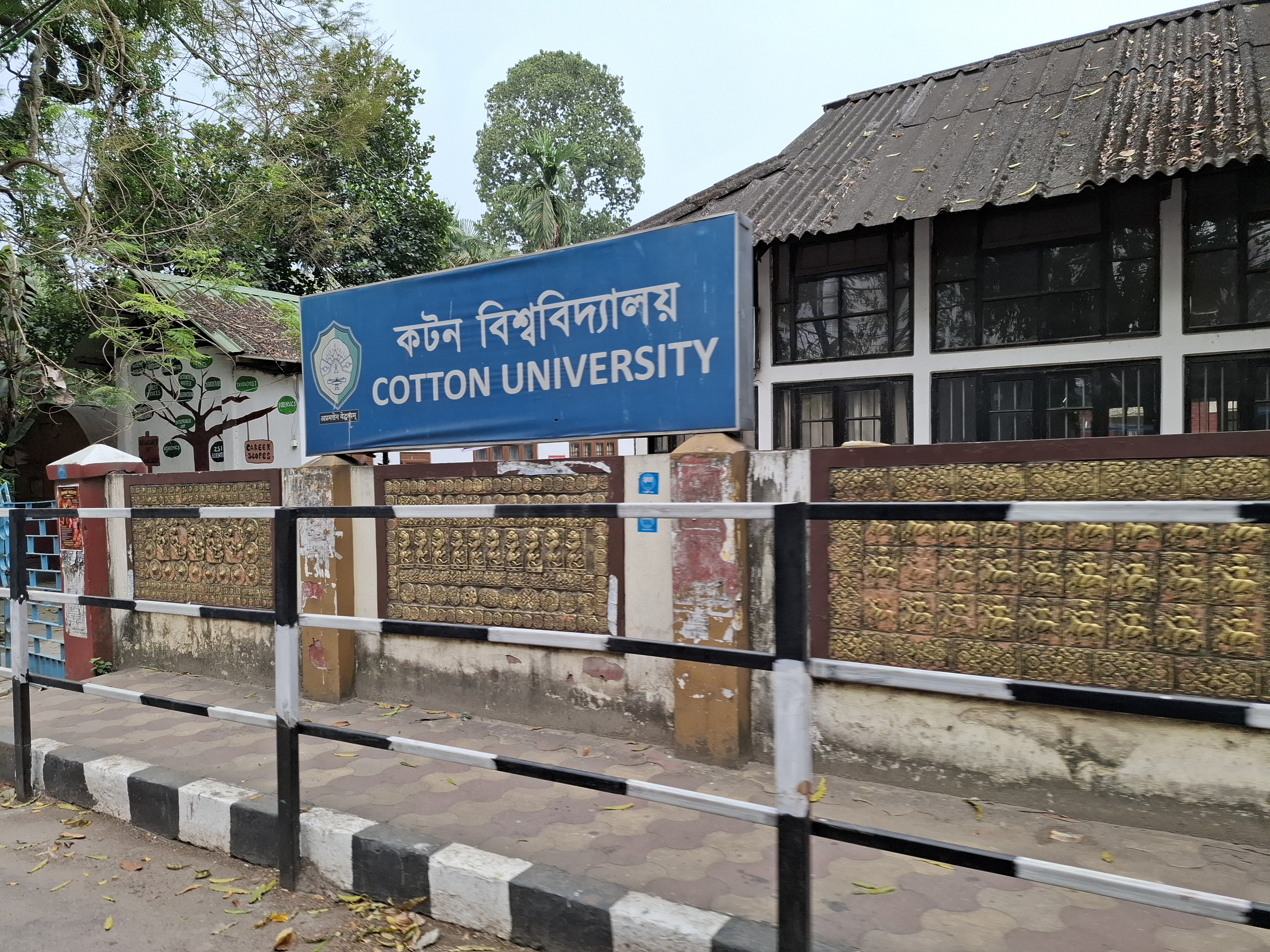
Entrance of the Cotton University

Over time, conflicts emerged between the university and the college chiefly over the custody of properties. The Assam Legislative Assembly passed an amendment in 2015 that the university and the college be run as separate institutes. The bill, called The Cotton University Act 2017, was passed by the Assam Legislative Assembly on 2 March 2017 in order to resolve these problems. By this act, the university and college would be completely merged. Upon enforcement, the university was renamed Cotton University. By ordinance, the governor of Assam, Banwarilal Purohit became chancellor, who then appointed Bhabesh Chandra Goswami as the first vice chancellor in July 2017.

== Campus ==
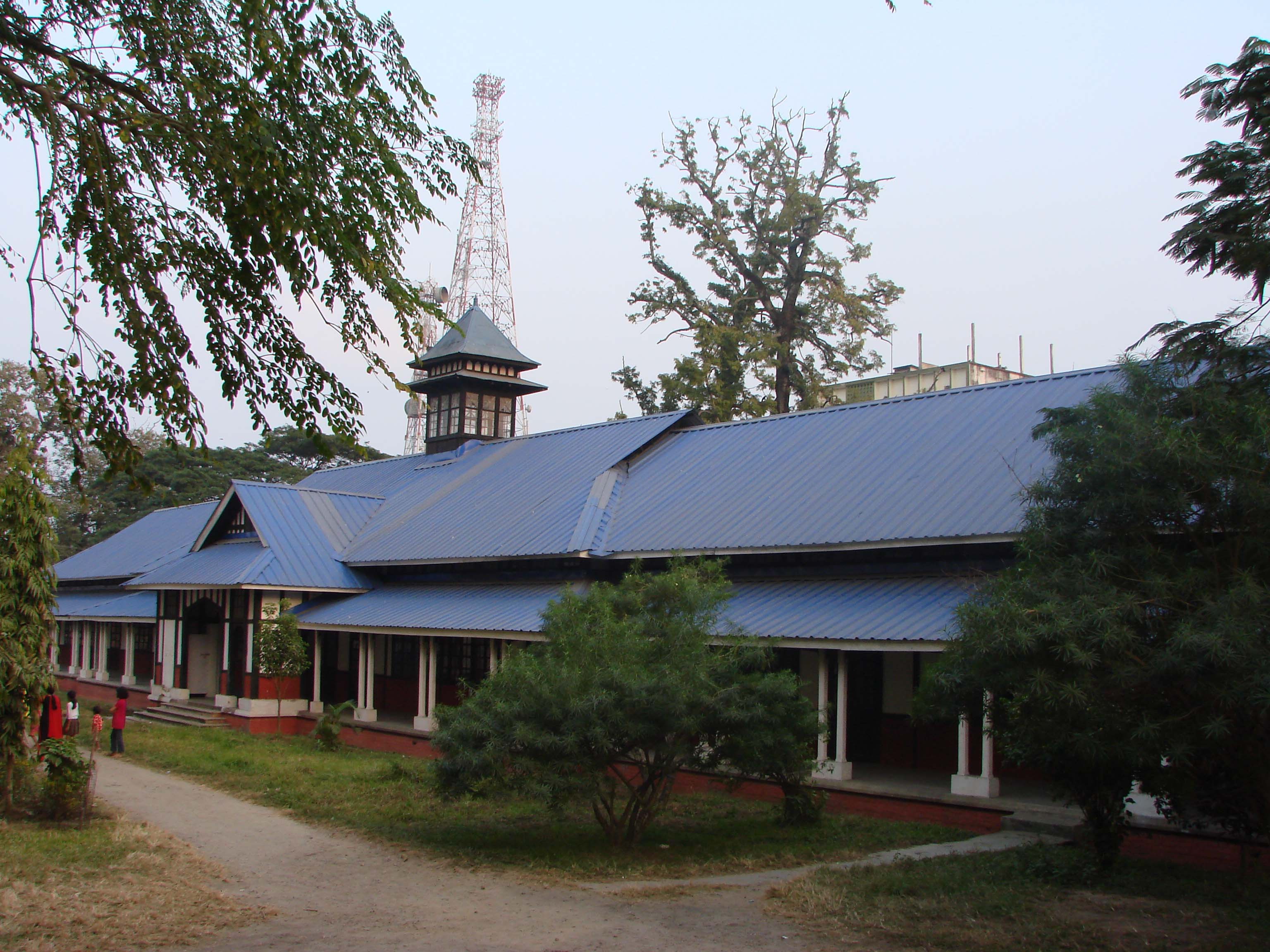
A structure at Cotton University

Cotton University's campus spans 39.82 acres in Panbazar, Guwahati, an area known for its bustling streets and key landmarks, including the BSNL office, Reserve Bank of India, Gauhati High Court, and Handique Girls College. The Dighalipukhuri bus stop, situated nearby, connects to several key townships, contributing to the area's vibrant atmosphere.

== Controversy ==
On 6 October 2018, violence broke out in connection with student politics at Cotton University in Guwahati, as the university prepared for its upcoming campus elections. Nabajit Dutta, a candidate for the position of general secretary, and another student, Trinayan Baruah, were attacked by unknown assailants in the Japorigog area. Both students sustained injuries but were able to escape. A formal complaint (FIR) was filed at the Dispur police station following the incident.

On 8 December 2019, a video of Cotton University students chanting slogans of "Azaadi" gained attention on social media amid ongoing protests against the Citizenship Amendment Bill (CAB) in Assam. The video, shared by Facebook user Ivan Ahmed, depicted students expressing their discontent with the government. The chants included demands for freedom from the CAB and targeted specific leaders such as Assam's the then Chief Minister Sarbananda Sonowal, the then Finance and Health Minister Himanta Biswa Sarma, and the then Education Minister Siddhartha Bhattacharya. The students were heard chanting "Sarbananda se azaadi, Himanta se azaadi, Bharat se azaadi, Siddhartha se azaadi," along with calls for liberation from the Rashtriya Swayamsevak Sangh (RSS). The Students’ Union of Cotton University had organized a rally called Rono Hunkaar, or 'War Cry,' to protest the controversial bill, which aims to provide a pathway to citizenship for undocumented non-Muslims from Pakistan, Afghanistan, and Bangladesh. This legislation has faced significant opposition from residents of Assam and other northeastern states. The Northeast Students’ Organisation (NESO) announced a regional shutdown to mark collective dissent against the CAB, which was scheduled for final review in the Rajya Sabha.

On 8 January 2020, students of Cotton University in Guwahati hoisted black flags to protest against the attack on students and teachers at Jawaharlal Nehru University (JNU), which has been a controversial institution often labeled as anti-nationalist. The Cotton University students expressed solidarity with the victims and demanded government action against the attackers. Sudarshan Kaushik Sarma emphasized concerns about student safety, stating that if safety could not be ensured in the national capital, other regions would also be at risk. The Assam Students' Forum also called for the resignation of Union Home Minister Amit Shah over the incident.

On 7 January 2022, at least 15 students from Cotton University were injured in a clash between two hostels: Mahendra Nath Deka Phukan (MNDP) and Sita Nath Brahma Choudhury (SNBC). The altercation arose over the results of the university's student union general elections. One of the injured students, Pragyan Protim Bora, was severely hurt and was initially taken to Gauhati Medical College and Hospital (GMCH) before being transferred to a private hospital in the city the following day. According to Prithviraj Rajkhowa, assistant commissioner of police in Guwahati, the incident occurred around 10:30 PM on Wednesday, shortly after the election results were announced. The elections, which took place on Tuesday, were closely contested. The MNDP hostel, supported by the Satra Mukti Sangram Samiti (SMSS), secured three key positions: vice-president, general secretary, and assistant general secretary. In contrast, the SNBC hostel, backed by the Asom Chatra Parishad (ACP), managed to win only the presidency. SMSS is affiliated with Sivasagar MLA Akhil Gogoi’s Krishak Mukti Sangram Samiti (KMSS), while the ACP is the student wing of the ruling Bharatiya Janata Party’s key ally, the Asom Gana Parishad (AGP). Rustom Raj Brahma, the officer in charge of the Panbazar police station, noted that both hostels filed First Information Reports (FIRs) against each other. The MNDP hostel accused students from the SNBC hostel of attacking them with sticks and bamboo, as well as pelting stones, resulting in injuries to over 15 students from the MNDP hostel. A similar FIR was lodged by the SNBC hostel against the MNDP hostel, containing similar allegations.

On 2 July 2022, several students at Cotton University in Guwahati were injured during a clash between two hostels in the early hours of Saturday. Around 1:45 AM, inmates of a boys' hostel reportedly threw bricks, bottles, and other objects at another hostel. Several students who were asleep at the time sustained injuries, with some retaliating by throwing similar objects. One student was seriously injured and required admission to Gauhati Medical College and Hospital. The circumstances leading to the clash remain unclear; however, university sources indicated that tensions on campus had increased following the general secretary of the students' union's decision to join the ruling Bharatiya Janata Party (BJP). On the preceding Thursday, students, particularly those residing in various hostels, held a demonstration on campus, expressing their belief that he had been supported as an apolitical candidate and arguing that it was "unethical" for him to join a political party. Following the incident, a case was filed, and an investigation was initiated by the police and the students were arrested.

On 14 November 2022, Guwahati Police arrested Anupam Mali for allegedly attacking Rapido driver Sajid Choudhury on November 10 near the Guwahati Railway Station. The incident involved a group of Cotton University students following their elections. CCTV footage showed Mali carrying a wooden log during the assault. While Trinayan Baruah, an Asom Chatra Parishad leader, was present, he was not directly involved in the attack. The case raised concerns about the safety of app-based drivers, especially during late hours, with calls for more government action.

A 21-year-old female student from Cotton University in Guwahati was reported to have died by suicide at her residence in Goreswar, located in Assam's Tamulpur district, on 2 December 2022. According to police, the victim was a BA fifth-semester student at the university. Her body was discovered hanging from the ceiling fan at her home. Authorities found a suicide note and are currently investigating the circumstances surrounding her tragic decision. The note indicated that the student attributed her actions to her difficult financial situation, stating, "My economic condition is extremely bad; I am ugly; I hate my life."

On 24 February 2023, a Higher Secondary student from Cotton University, Surya Narayan Das, was reported missing. Surya last spoke to his mother at 8:30 PM on Thursday, shortly before leaving his hostel room in Uzan Bazaar at 9 PM after dinner. In response to the report, the Latasil Police initiated a search operation to locate the missing student. He was never found and was later declared dead.

On 6 March 2023, four students from Cotton University were arrested by Panbazar police for their alleged involvement in two separate assault incidents. The students, identified as Mriganka Kashyap, Hrishikesh Das, Mausam Mahanta, and Sanjay Rangthal, are all undergraduates in their sixth semester. Kashyap and Das, who reside at the MNDP hostel, are accused of attacking the district general secretary of the BJP Guwahati city unit. Meanwhile, Mahanta and Rangthal allegedly assaulted an employee of NF Railway at the Guwahati Railway Station. Sanjay, who was initially absconding, was apprehended at Lokpriya Gopinath Bordoloi International Airport. The arrests were made following two First Information Reports (FIRs) lodged at the Panbazar Police Station, leading to charges under sections 143, 279, 294, 307, and 326 of the Indian Penal Code (IPC).

On 27 November 2023, an alleged assault occurred involving students from Cotton University in Guwahati. The incident took place on the university campus, where a woman was reportedly attacked by a group of male students, said to be residents of the MNDP hostel. According to reports, the group of students was initially involved in an altercation with a man they accused of theft. When the woman and her husband attempted to intervene, they were allegedly assaulted by the students. The woman later reported that she was struck on the head, resulting in her losing consciousness. Following the incident, the students reportedly fled to the MNDP hostel and secured the gates. Authorities from the Panbazar police station responded to the scene, and the woman was taken for a medical examination. Panbazar police station Officer-in-Charge Bhargab Borbora stated that a formal First Information Report (FIR) was anticipated to be filed. Investigations were ongoing based on the woman’s account. The woman alleged that approximately six male students were involved in the attack, but one individual who physically assaulted her had not been identified. In contrast, students from the MNDP hostel denied the allegations, asserting that the woman was inebriated and was standing near the hostel gate. They claimed that she was accidentally knocked down by two individuals fleeing the scene after being chased by security personnel. However, police officials maintained that the woman was not under the influence of alcohol at the time of the incident. This event is part of a broader context of previous allegations involving Cotton University students, particularly concerning incidents of violence or altercations.

On 12 December 2023, a female student at Cotton University in Guwahati attempted to take her own life by jumping from the second floor of the MCB administrative building. The student, who is enrolled in the first year of the Higher Secondary (HS) Arts stream, was promptly transported to Nemcare Hospital following the incident. She is currently receiving treatment in the Intensive Care Unit (ICU).

On 10 April 2024, another tragic incident occurred involving Kalina Barua, a first-year student at Cotton University, who died after jumping from her student residence, the Pranalaya PG. The incident has raised significant concerns about mental health awareness among students. Kalina's fall from the second floor resulted in severe injuries, and she was promptly taken to Gauhati Medical College and Hospital for urgent medical treatment. Unfortunately, despite the medical team's efforts, she succumbed to her injuries. The reasons behind Kalina's drastic decision remain unclear, leaving the university community in shock and mourning. This incident has prompted serious discussions regarding mental health support systems and the need for greater awareness among students at Cotton University.

On 3 August 2024, students residing in the SNBC hostel at Cotton University staged a protest to highlight the lack of basic facilities. The hostellers expressed their grievances regarding inadequate amenities, which have impacted their living conditions and overall experience at the university. The demonstration aimed to draw attention to their demands for improved infrastructure and services within the hostel.

On 14 August 2024, a former Cotton University student, Sanjan Gohain, was involved in an alleged assault on a security guard at the SNBC (New) hostel on the university's campus. The incident reportedly occurred when the guard, Purbajyoti Kalita, attempted to stop Gohain and another individual from consuming alcohol on the premises. Despite the guard's intervention, Gohain allegedly continued drinking and urinated inside the hostel. The situation escalated when Gohain, with assistance from another person, physically attacked Kalita and damaged his clothing. Following the incident, Kalita filed a First Information Report (FIR) at the Panbazar police station. It was noted that Gohain has a history of prior cases registered at the police station. Local residents have also indicated that late-night drinking at the SNBC hostel has been a persistent issue, contributing to disturbances in the neighborhood.

On 16 September 2024, an incident occurred at Cotton State University in Guwahati when a man was struck by a speeding water tanker near the Mahendra Nath Deka Phukan Hostel, resulting in serious injuries. Following the accident, students from the University reacted by protesting on the streets, expressing their frustration and demanding immediate action to improve safety measures. The students called for the establishment of a 'closed corridor' around the University premises to enhance pedestrian safety and prevent future accidents. Their demonstration caused significant traffic disruptions, as they blocked the road and insisted on a response to their demands. As of now, University authorities have not publicly addressed the students' concerns, underscoring the need for improved safety protocols in areas with high pedestrian traffic.

On February 10, 2025, a cultural procession organized by students of Cotton University was interrupted by the police near the university premises, leading to a verbal confrontation. The procession was part of the university’s Varsity Week celebrations. According to the police, the event was halted due to the absence of the necessary permissions. A police official stated that the students had not obtained prior approval for the procession, which led to its obstruction. However, Nirab Hazarika, the General Secretary of the Varsity Union Body, asserted that the request for permission had been submitted a day earlier, following police instructions to apply online. Despite this, the request was reportedly denied. Hazarika mentioned that students were informed about restrictions on processions due to the upcoming Advantage Assam 2.0 event, though the police later refuted this claim. Even after deciding to limit the procession within the campus, the students faced intervention from authorities. He also expressed disappointment that permission was denied for the event near Nehru Park and Khao Gali, areas not on the main public transport route. Hazarika further alleged that a similar procession by Handique Girls' College had taken place a day earlier, suggesting inconsistency in enforcement. However, the police maintained that no permissions were granted for such events. The Varsity Week celebrations began on February 7, 2025, and were scheduled to conclude on February 13, 2025.

On 12th September 2025, The University experienced student unrest following an alleged assault involving a 21-year-old student from Manipur. This incident led to the registration of a First Information Report (FIR) against 11 individuals, including current and former students of the university. The alleged victim, Debashish Barman, reported that on September 8, he was abducted, confined in a hostel room, and physically assaulted by the accused. According to his complaint, the assailants dragged him by his legs, beat him with a guitar, tore his shirt, and threatened to kill him. They also allegedly tried to force him into making an obscene video. Following the FIR, students of the SNBC Boys' Hostel staged protests on campus, claiming that the university authorities and police were harassing them and that the legal action was unjustified. The Panbazar police registered a case against the 11 individuals based on Barman’s complaint, with charges including wrongful confinement and criminal intimidation. Despite the ongoing investigation, the university’s student union announced that the student elections would proceed as scheduled on September 24. The incident brought attention to student safety and the handling of disputes within academic institutions, with the investigation continuing to determine the facts and ensure justice.

== Challenges ==
The University faces significant accessibility challenges for specially-abled students due to encroachments and lack of infrastructure. Illegal shops and food stalls along footpaths near the College Hostel Roads, including Lakshminath Bezbaroa Road and College Hostel Road, have forced pedestrians onto busy roads, endangering the safety of students, particularly those who are visually impaired. The Cotton University Forum for the Specially Abled has raised concerns about the absence of essential accessibility features such as railings and tactile paving on sidewalks connecting hostels to the main campus. This lack of infrastructure, combined with hazardous walkways, poses significant challenges for the over 30 specially-abled students at the university. Students residing in hostels near Dighalipukhuri, especially visually impaired women, face difficulties due to high-speed traffic and the absence of a dedicated transport service. The forum has called for the introduction of a free, permanent e-rickshaw service to ensure safe commuting and for improvements to the university's older buildings to enhance accessibility. Despite complaints to local authorities about unauthorized vendors occupying sidewalks, the issue remains unresolved, creating persistent mobility challenges for the affected students.

In May 2025, The University in Guwahati became the site of major student protests as hundreds of undergraduate and postgraduate students demonstrated against what they described as ongoing academic mismanagement. The protest, which began on May 19, disrupted normal academic functioning, with students locking the university gates and blocking internal roads. Central to their demands was the resignation of the Controller of Examinations Dr. Kalyan Kumar Hazarika, whom they accused of poor communication, irregular exam scheduling, and delays in result declarations, all of which they claimed negatively affected their academic preparation and mental health. In a formal memorandum, students demanded the immediate release of pending results for various semesters by May 31, timely issuance of Non-Collegiate and Dis-Collegiate lists at least 12 days before exam form deadlines, and that postgraduate second semester exams be held only after June 11 to avoid overlapping with the Assam Public Service Commission Preliminary Exam. Additional demands included adequate gaps between exam dates, revised morning exam timings, timely issuance of admit cards, and better transparency in academic notifications. Students also raised concerns about the delayed publication of the NCDC list—essential for exam eligibility–which they claimed was issued after the form submission deadline, in violation of University Grants Commission norms. They further criticized the scheduling of undergraduate second and fourth semester exams without adequate preparation time, calling for a two-day gap between papers. Protesters urged the university to release all pending undergraduate results by May 23, citing that other universities had already done so.

On 27 August 2025, students of the University, staged a protest against the university administration over a series of long-pending grievances. Demonstrators, many of whom wore black attire, gathered on the campus and blocked the entrance to the office of the Vice Chancellor. Some protesters carried placards, including one that read “Missing VC. The agitation was sparked by the non-issuance of identity cards for third-semester students, which had reportedly been pending for over a year. Students stated that the absence of identity cards had caused difficulties in accessing university facilities and in appearing for examinations. Another major issue raised was the delay in the declaration of results. Protesters pointed out that results of the back/betterment examination for fifth-semester undergraduates had not been released for more than eight months. Sanitation and hygiene on campus also featured prominently among the demands. Students alleged that basic amenities such as washrooms were in poor condition despite repeated memorandums submitted to the administration. The lack of access to safe drinking water was also criticized, with protesters claiming that existing water filters were either non-functional or left unchecked. The protest reflected growing frustration among the student body over what they described as administrative negligence and delays in addressing essential academic and infrastructural issues.

== Academics ==
=== Academic programmes ===
==== HSSLC ====
In keeping with the former Cotton College's traditions, courses leading to Higher Secondary School Leaving Certificate are possible in the Arts and Science streams. This qualification is awarded upon successful completion of two years of study followed by relevant examinations under the Assam Higher Secondary Education Council.

==== Bachelors degrees ====
Bachelor of Arts, Bachelor of Science, Bachelor of Computer Application, Bachelor of Liberal Arts, Bachelor of Mass Communication and Journalism and Bachelor of Science (Hons) Biotechnology graduate degrees are offered. The degrees are awarded upon successful completion of three years of study followed by relevant examinations under Cotton University.

The University, has announced the medium of examination for its Four-Year Undergraduate Programme (FYUGP). As per the notification issued on March 25, 2025, the examination for major and minor courses will be conducted exclusively in English. This policy is in accordance with the National Education Policy (NEP) 2020 and has received approval from the Vice-Chancellor of the University.

==== Masters degrees ====
Postgraduate programs leading to the degrees of Master of Arts, Master of Science, Master of Library and Information Science, Master of Law, Master in Computer Application and Master of Science in Artificial Intelligence and Machine Learning are offered. The degrees are awarded upon successful completion of two years of study followed by relevant examinations under Cotton University.

==== Doctoral programme (PhD) ====
The degree of Doctor of Philosophy (Ph.D.) is offered in all postgraduate departments. Admission opens annually in June/July.

== Courses ==
=== Science ===
==== Physical, Chemical and Mathematical Sciences ====
- Physics
- Chemistry
- Mathematics
- Statistics
- Computer Science
- Library and Information Science.

==== Life Sciences ====
- Botany
- Zoology
- Environmental Biology and Wildlife Sciences
- Molecular Biology and Biotechnology.

==== Earth Sciences ====
- Geology
- Geography.

=== Languages, Literature and Linguistics ===
==== Modern Indian Languages (MIL) ====
- Assamese
- Bengali
- Bodo
- Hindi
- Sanskrit.

==== Foreign Languages ====
- Arabic
- English
- Persian.

=== Human and Social Sciences ===
==== Humanities ====
- Anthropology
- Ancient Indian Culture, History and Archeology
- Economics
- Education
- History
- Philosophy
- Political Science
- Psychology
- Sociology.

==== Communication and Legal Studies ====
- Mass communication
- Journalism
- Media studies
- Law.

== Seat capacity ==
=== HSSLC ===
The institution offers Higher Secondary (HS) courses in two streams: Science and Arts. The Science stream has four sections, each with an intake capacity of 95 students, resulting in a total of 380 seats. The Arts stream consists of one section with an intake capacity of 160 students. In total, the institution offers 475 seats for Higher Secondary (HSSLC) courses.

==== Arts ====
Intake Capacity
#	Stream	Sections	Capacity per Section	Total Capacity
1	Arts	1	160	160

==== Science ====
Intake Capacity
#	Stream	Sections	Capacity per Section	Total Capacity
1	Science	4	95	380

=== Undergraduate ===
In the Undergraduate (UG) programs, there are a total of 511 seats available for Arts subjects and 480 seats for Science subjects. Combined, the institution offers 991 seats for UG Arts and Science courses.

==== Arts ====
Intake Capacity
#	Subject	Capacity
1	Anthropology	25
2	Arabic	10
3	Assamese	50
4	Bengali	10
5	Bodo	16
6	Economics	60
7	Education	25
8	Hindi	20
9	English	60
10	History	40
11	Mass Communication & Journalism	20
12	Political Science	60
13	Sociology	30
14	Sanskrit	15
15	Psychology	30
16	Philosophy	40
Total Capacity		511

==== Science ====
Intake Capacity
#	Subject	Capacity
1	Botany	45
2	Chemistry	65
3	Computer Science	20
4	Statistics	30
5	Physics	65
6	Mathematics	80
7	Zoology	60
8	Geology	40
9	Geography	30
10	Molecular Biology and Biotechnology	45
Total Capacity		480

=== Postgraduate ===
In the Postgraduate (PG) programs, there are 690 seats available for Arts subjects and 278 seats for Science subjects. Altogether, the institution offers 968 seats for PG Arts and Science courses.

==== Arts ====
Intake Capacity
#	Subject	Capacity
1	Assamese	56
2	Archeology	20
3	Hindi	36
4	English	56
5	Bengali	20
6	Bodo	20
7	Sanskrit	20
8	Arabic	40
9	Anthropology	26
10	History	44
11	Mass Communication & Journalism	40
12	Psychology	26
13	Political Science	60
14	Economics	54
15	Education	40
16	Sociology	26
17	Philosophy	50
Total Capacity		690

==== Science ====
Intake Capacity
#	Subject	Capacity
1	Botany	24
2	Chemistry	34
3	Geography	30
4	Geology	20
5	Statistics	24
6	Mathematics	44
7	Physics	34
8	Zoology	28
9	Molecular Biology and Biotechnology	20
10	Environmental Science	20
Total Capacity		278

=== Doctor of Philosophy ===
Intake Capacity of all stream programs
Sl. No.	Department	No. of Seats	Faculty
1	Anthropology	3	Human and Social Sciences
2	Arabic & Persian	1	Languages, Literature and Linguistics
3	Archaeology	1	Human and Social Sciences
4	Assamese	5	Languages, Literature and Linguistics
5	Bodo	1	Languages, Literature and Linguistics
6	Botany	2	Life Sciences
7	Chemistry	16	Physical, Chemical and Mathematical Sciences
8	Computer Science and Information Technology	4	Physical, Chemical and Mathematical Sciences
9	Economics	2	Human and Social Sciences
10	Education	3	Human and Social Sciences
11	Environmental Biology and Wildlife Sciences	3	Life Sciences
12	Geography	2	Earth Sciences
13	Geology	2	Earth Sciences
14	Law	2	Human and Social Sciences
15	Mass Communication, Journalism and Media Studies	1	Human and Social Sciences
16	Mathematics	4	Physical, Chemical and Mathematical Sciences
17	Molecular Biology and Biotechnology	3	Life Sciences
18	Philosophy	1	Human and Social Sciences
19	Physics	5	Physical, Chemical and Mathematical Sciences
20	Political Science	4	Human and Social Sciences
21	History	3	Human and Social Sciences
22	Psychology	1	Human and Social Sciences
23	Sociology	3	Human and Social Sciences
24	Sanskrit	6	Languages, Literature and Linguistics
25	Statistics	2	Physical, Chemical and Mathematical Sciences
26	Zoology	10	Life Sciences

== Admission ==
=== Higher Secondary ===
Cotton University (CU) has released tentative cut-off marks for higher secondary admissions, with 87% for the science stream and 84% for the arts stream. The cut-offs may vary depending on the number of applicants. There are 180 seats in the arts stream and 320 in the science stream. Applicants must complete the application process on both the DARPAN and Cotton University websites. Admissions will be based on a merit list from the candidates' qualifying exam results, followed by counselling and seat allocation.

=== Undergraduate Courses ===
Cotton University allocates 40 percent of undergraduate seats across all departments to candidates who have taken the Common University Entrance Test (CUET). The remaining 60 percent of seats will be filled based on academic performance. According to Academic Registrar Bedanta Bora, priority will be given to CUET candidates.

On 8 September 2021, Cotton University (CU) launched its online UG admission portal, increasing its intake by 25% due to high pass rates in class XII boards. The additional seats are reserved for Assam state board students, and a new 10% quota has been introduced for economically weaker sections (EWS). The intake increase aims to support state board students, while admissions will be based on merit. A conflicting reservation policy, initially mandating 75% seats for state board students, was later adjusted by the education minister to exclude urban areas.

Chemistry recorded the highest cut-off percentage among all BSc major courses, with the general category cut-off at 90.66%, followed by physics at 89.33% and zoology at 87.66%. The cut-off for mathematics was 87.33%, while botany had a cut-off of 85.33%.

On March 12, 2025, The University announced that undergraduate admissions would now be based solely on Higher Secondary (10+2) marks, replacing the previous system that considered CUET scores for a portion of the seats. Prospective students have been advised to check the university’s official website for further details on the admission process.

=== Postgraduate Courses ===
Cotton University reserves 50 percent of seats in each postgraduate course for its own graduates, based on their CGPA results, subject to certain conditions. The minimum CGPA required is 5.5 for Unreserved Category, 5.3 for Other Backward Class/MOBC, and 5.0 for Scheduled Caste/Scheduled Tribe (plains/hills) at the undergraduate level. The remaining 50 percent, designated as 'Open Category' seats, are available to graduates with honors or majors in the relevant or related disciplines from recognized universities. Admission to the 'Open Category' seats will be based on performance in the Cotton PG Entrance Examination (CPGEE). In some subjects, all seats, including those reserved for CU graduates, will be filled through CPGEE. The registration fee is Rs 800 per subject. The CPGEE comprises 50 questions, with each question carrying a weight of 4 marks, resulting in a total of 200 marks. There is also a negative marking system in place, where 1 mark is deducted for each incorrect answer. The entrance exam lasts for 1 hour and 30 minutes.

Out of CPGEE's 200 marks, a maximum of 100 marks and a minimum of 50 marks are required for an Unreserved Category (UR) student to secure a seat. Admission calls are conducted in three rounds based on the availability of seats in respective categories and courses.

The subject-wise previous years' question papers for the Cotton Post Graduate Entrance Exam (CPGEE) are available for review on the websites Bohikitap.in and FreshersNow.com.

=== PhD Courses ===
The Candidates applying for the PhD program must have 55% marks (50% for SC/ST) in a Master's degree from a University Grants Commission-recognized university. Admission requires qualifying the National Eligibility Test or the university’s entrance examination, followed by a viva voce and counselling session. Selected students must complete coursework, including three 4-credit and one 2-credit courses. After passing the coursework, candidates are provisionally registered and must apply for final registration within 18–24 months. The PhD registration is valid for five years, with a possible extension of up to seven years under special circumstances.

On 25 November 2024, The Cotton University PhD Researchers Association (CURSA) has raised concerns about the draft Assam College Employees Regulations, 2024, which proposes amendments to the recruitment process for teachers and staff in provincialised colleges. The draft, introduced in January 2024, suggests replacing traditional academic qualifications such as PhDs, MPhils, and research experience with a civil service-style examination conducted by the Assam Public Service Commission (APSC). CURSA has criticized the draft for overlooking the academic qualifications and research contributions of candidates, which it believes undermines the recruitment process for college educators. The association also argued that the proposed changes contradict the National Education Policy (NEP) 2020, which emphasizes the importance of research, innovation, and academic excellence in higher education. In a statement, CURSA expressed concern that the new examination framework, which focuses on general knowledge rather than specialized academic skills, is ill-suited for hiring educators in niche academic fields. The association also noted that the proposal devalues the qualifications obtained through rigorous processes like the National Eligibility Test (NET) and State Level Eligibility Test (SLET). CURSA has called on the Assam government to engage with academic and research stakeholders to develop a recruitment policy that aligns with the objectives of NEP 2020. The association has urged Chief Minister Himanta Biswa Sarma and Education Minister Ranoj Pegu to address these issues and ensure that the interests of Assam’s academic community are safeguarded.

== Facilities ==
=== Library ===
The Dr. Surya Kumar Bhuyan Library of Cotton University, one of Northeast India's oldest libraries, has a rich history dating back to the institution's inception. Initially located in a spacious hall of a single-story building, the library’s evolution began in the 1907-1912 quinquennium with the appointment of its first librarian and the establishment of a faculty committee to oversee its management by 1913. As its collection grew, the library moved to a dedicated building formerly occupied by the Physics department. In 1986, it was renamed in honor of Dr. Suryya Kumar Bhuyan. The library's growth continued with the laying of the foundation stone for a new three-story building by President Dr. Shankar Dayal Sharma in 1992. This new facility was officially inaugurated on May 29, 2001, by former Chief Minister Sri Tarun Gogoi. Today, the library boasts an extensive collection of 130,968 textbooks, 4,935 reference books, 56 theses, 6,365 donated books, 648 braille books, and 3,263 bound volumes, reflecting its long-standing commitment to knowledge and scholarship.

=== Hostels ===
Cotton University is home to four boys' hostels: Rajani Kanta Bordoloi Hostel, Seeta Nath Brahma Choudhury Hostel, Mahendra Nath Deka Phukan Hostel, and Swahid Ranjit Barpuzari Hostel, collectively accommodating up to 320 students. For female students, the university offers three hostels: Nalini Bala Devi Hostel, Swahid Kanak Lata Hostel, and Dr. Kamala Roy Hostel, which together house 335 students. In total, the seven hostels provide accommodation for 655 students.

== Notable alumni and faculty ==
=== Noted alumni ===
- Hijam Irabot, Manipuri freedom fighter
- Abul Quasem, Pakistani politician and provincial minister
- Amulya Barua, Assamese poet
- A. Thanglura, Indian politician
- Nayandeep Deka Baruah, Indian mathematician and professor
- Bhupen Hazarika, Bharat Ratna, renowned playback singer, musician and filmmaker
- Bharat Narah, politician
- Birendra Kumar Bhattacharya, Indian writer
- Ralengnao Khathing, Indian soldier, diplomat, civil servant
- Surya Kumar Bhuyan, former president of Asom Sahitya Sabha
- Kopil Bora, Assamese actor
- Gopinath Bordoloi, Bharat Ratna, former Chief Minister of Assam
- Homen Borgohain, Indian writer
- Nirupama Borgohain, Indian journalist
- Sanjib Baruah, political scientist
- Parineeta Borthakur, Assamese actor
- Upendranath Brahma, former president of the All Bodo Students' Union
- Ambika Charan Choudhury, Indian litterateur, historian and activist
- Moinul Hoque Choudhury, Indian politician
- Rita Chowdhury, Indian writer
- Ardhendu Kumar Dey, Indian politician
- Lalit Kumar Doley, Indian politician
- Akhil Gogoi, peasant leader and MLA, Sibsagar, Assam
- Ranjan Gogoi, 46th Chief Justice of India
- Bhupendra Nath Goswami, Indian meteorologist
- Indira Goswami, Indian writer
- Jitendra Nath Goswami, Indian scientist
- Parbati Kumar Goswami, judge of India
- Krishna Kanta Handique, Sanskrit scholar
- Satish Chandra Kakati, ex-editor of The Assam Tribune
- Gauri Shankar Kalita, journalist
- Kamalendu Deb Krori, Indian physicist
- Jyotiprasad Medhi, Indian statistician
- Okhil Kumar Medhi, former vice chancellor of Gauhati University
- Motiur Rohman Mondal, Indian politician and physician
- Arupa Kalita Patangia, Indian novelist
- Maitrayee Patar, Indian writer and singer
- Kalpana Patowary, playback and folk singer (Bhojpuri and others)
- Anuradha Sharma Pujari, Assamese journalist and author
- Debapratim Purkayastha, Indian academic
- Jyoti Prasad Rajkhowa, former governor of Arunachal Pradesh
- Muhammed Saadulah, Prime Minister of Assam Province
- Anupam Saikia, Indian mathematician
- Bhabendra Nath Saikia, Indian film director, writer
- Hiteswar Saikia, former chief minister of Assam
- Himanta Biswa Sarma, chief minister Of Assam
- Sarat Chandra Sinha, former chief minister of Assam
- Zerifa Wahid, actor
- Riniki Bhuyan Sarma, Indian businesswoman

=== Noted faculty ===
- Abu Nasr Waheed, educationist, was a professor of Arabic and Persian at Cotton College.

=== List of principals ===
The institute had 50 principals from 1901 till 2012.

No.	Principal	Tenure
1	F.W. Sudmersen	1901–1926
2	D. Thomson	1926–1933
3	A.E. Brown	1933–1934
4	D.E. Roberts	1934–1937
5	S.C. Roy	1937–1940
6	B.C. Sengupta	1940–1942
7	H.N. Sen	1942–1943
8	Ankushjyoti Kalita	1943
9	S.N. Sen	1943–1944
10	R.R. Thomas	1945–1946
11	S.K. Bhuyan	1946
12	P.C. Sanyal	1946–1947
13	S.M. Mahibullah	1947
14	B.Kalita	1993 –
15	U.K. Goswami	1949
16	S.N. Chakravarty	1949–1952
17	H.C. Bhuyan	1952–1954
18	U.K. Dutta	1954–1958
19	H.C. Goswami	1958–1963
20	H.K. Barpujari	1963
21	N. Islam	1963–1969
22	K. Roy	1969
23	p.c. Goswami	1969–1970
24	Mada Mitra	1970–1972
25	Abdul Jalil	1972 – 1974
26	Manash Kumar Baishya	1996 –

S.No.	Name	Tenure
27.	A. Sarma	1975
28.	A. Ali	1975–1979
29.	A. Latif	1979
30.	G.C. Deka	1979–1986
31.	R.K. Das	1986–1987
32.	K.D. Krori	1987–1991
33.	A.K. Goswami	1991–1993
34.	B.C. Choudhury	1993–1994
35.	M.C. Ghose	1994–1995, 1995–1996 (dean)
36.	T. Mahanta	1996–1997 (dean)
37.	J. Datta	1 January 1998 – 31 January 1998 (dean)
38.	K.C. Paul	1 February 1998 – 30 June 1998 (dean)
39.	P. Kakati	1 July 1998 – 30 November 1998 (dean)
40.	D.K. Kakati	1 December 1998 – 31 May 1999 (dean)
41.	M. Dev Choudhury	1 June 1999 – 29 February 2000 (dean)
42.	D.K. Barua	1 March 2000 – 7 March 2000 (dean), 8 March 2000 – 7 November 2000(Principal)
43.	R. Thakuria	8 November 2000 – 31 December 2002
44.	J. Medhi	1 January 2003 – 31 August 2003
45.	U.A. Bharali	1 September 2003 – 31 August 2006
46.	T. Sircar	1 September 2006 – 8 January 2007
47.	I.K Bhattacharyya	9 January 2007 to 31 October 2011
48.	S. Barua	1 November 2011 – 30 November 2011
49.	Jamuna Sharma Choudhury	1 December 2011 – 31 December 2011
50.	Prasanta Kumar Bordoloi	1 January 2012 – 17 March 2012
51.	Nirada Devi	18 March 2012 – 2017
