= Anchalik Gana Morcha =

- President: Ajit Kumar Bhuyan
- Rajya Sabha Leader: Ajit Kumar Bhuyan
- Founded: 2020
- Dissolved: 2026
- Merged into: Assam Jatiya Parishad
- Headquarters: Guwahati
- Ideology: Anti-CAA
- ECI Status: State Party
- Alliance: I.N.D.I.A. (till 2026); Asom Sonmilito Morcha (Assam) (till 2026)

Anchalik Gana Morcha was a regional Indian political party, launched in June 2020 in Assam. It was led by former Rajya Sabha MP Ajit Kumar Bhuyan. It contested the 2021 Assam Legislative Assembly election as part of the Indian National Congress-led Mahajot. In January 2026, AGM merged with AJP.
