= Prafulla Govinda Baruah =

Indian journalist (1932–2025)

- Born: 26 July 1932; Dibrugarh, Assam Province, British India
- Died: 14 December 2025 (aged 93); Guwahati, Assam, India
- Occupations: Journalist, businessman
- Years active: 1966–2025
- Known for: The Assam Tribune
- Awards: Padma Shri (2018)

Prafulla Govinda Baruah (26 July 1932 – 14 December 2025) was an Indian journalist who was the owner, editor and managing director of The Assam Tribune. In 2018, he was presented with the Padma Shri (civilian honour) for his contribution to the growth of literature and education in Assam, India.

== Background ==
Prafulla Govinda Baruah was born in Dibrugarh, Assam Province, British India on 26 July 1932, the son of Radha Govinda Baruah, the founder of The Assam Tribune. He died on 14 December 2025, at the age of 93.

== Career ==
The doyen of journalism in Assam, Prafulla Baruah became the Editor of The Assam Tribune in 1966 and was the managing director of The Assam Tribune Group. He was actively involved with various socio-cultural organisations and amateur theatre.

He received honours from various organisations such as the Kamala Saikia Trust, Asam Sahitya Sabha, and the Dr. B. Borooah Cancer Institute|Dr B. Borooah Cancer Institute for creating awareness for cancer.

In 2018, he was conferred the Padma Sri honour by the President of India. On 3 February 2019, doctorate degree was conferred to him at the 3rd convocation of Krishna Kanta Handiqui State Open University (KKSHOU).
