= Dainik Agradoot =

Indian newspaper

- Type: Daily newspaper
- Format: Broadsheet
- Owner: Agradoot Publishers Pvt. Ltd.
- Publisher: Agradoot Publishers Pvt. Ltd.
- Editor-in-chief: Kanak Sen Deka
- Editor: Pranjal Sen Deka
- Language: Assamese
- Headquarters: Guwahati, Assam
- Website: www.dainikagradoot.in

Dainik Agradoot (Assamese: দৈনিক অগ্ৰদূত, lit. 'The Daily Pioneer') is an Assamese-language daily newspaper owned by Agradoot Publishers Pvt. Ltd. It published simultaneously from Guwahati, Jorhat and Tezpur. Dainik Agradoot has its headquarters at Dispur, Guwahati.

== See also ==
- List of Assamese periodicals
