= Kamalendu Deb Krori =

Indian physicist

- Born: 21 January 1930 (age 96)
- Other name: Dr. K. D. Krori
- Education: University of Calcutta; Jadavpur University
- Known for: Krori–Barua Solution
- Scientific career
- Fields: Theoretical physics
- Workplaces: Cotton University; Gauhati University

Kamalendu Deb Krori (born 21 January 1930) is an Indian theoretical physicist and the former Principal of Cotton College.

He pioneered research on general relativity in the North Eastern region of India and guided 16 scholars for their Ph.D. degrees. He has co-authored almost 150 peer-reviewed research papers in International Journals. He is known for the “Krori-Barua Solution” a general relativistic solution for a singularity free charged fluid sphere (1975); the pertinent paper has more than 150 citations. In 1982, Krori along with two students showed why the elusive fundamental particles neutrinos, originally believed to be mass-less like the photons, must possess some finite rest mass in order to be consistent with Einstein's general theory of relativity.

In 1998, the Japanese Super-Kamiokande experiment confirmed that neutrinos indeed possess tiny masses by confirming existence of neutrino oscillations by which neutrinos change their flavours during their long cosmic journeys.

== Education and career ==
Krori received a BSc degree from Karimganj College and M.Sc from Calcutta University in 1953.

Krori joined Karimganj College and then Cotton College as a lecturer. He became a professor at St. Anthony's College, Shillong. After holding many teaching positions, he earned Ph.D. degree by virtue of independent research in theoretical physics from Jadavpur University, Kolkata, in 1971. He joined Cotton College, Guwahati, in north-east India, as a lecturer in physics. There he started research on the general theory of relativity. Later he became a full professor and headed the Department of Physics. He became the Principal of the institute in 1987 and retired in 1991.

== Honours and recognition ==
Krori has received awards including:

- Dr. H. C. Bhuyan award in Physical Sciences by Assam Science Society in 1990.
- Emeritus Fellowship by University Grants Commission, in Physics (1991-1993).
- National Teacher Award in 2010 from K.C. Das Commerce College.
- Vaidya Roychoudhury Award, 2020.
- Academic Physics Prize 2021.
- Member, New York Academy of Sciences, New York (USA).
- Assam Saurabh, 2nd highest civilian award of Assam, 2021
- Elected Fellow of the Physics Academy of the North East, 2025.

== Selected publications ==
- "Selected publications by K.D. Krori".

== Books ==
- K.D. Krori (2010) "Fundamentals of SPECIAL and GENERAL RELATIVITY," in: K.D. Krori (1 January 2010). Fundamentals of SPECIAL and GENERAL RELATIVITY. PHI LEARNING PVT. LTD. p. 332. ISBN 978-8120338678.
- K.D. Krori (2012) "Principles of Non - Relativistic and Relativistic Quantum Mechanics," in: K.D. Krori (1 January 2012). Principles of Non - Relativistic and Relativistic Quantum Mechanics. Prentice Hall India Learning Private Limited. p. 348. ISBN 978-8120344938.
- K.D. Krori (2012) "Advanced Heat and Thermodynamics," in: K.D. Krori (30 June 2004). Advanced Heat and Thermodynamics. New Central Book Agency. ISBN 978-8173819353.
