= Melodies and Guns =

Translated poetry book by ULFA rebel

Melodies and Guns Poems of Megan Kachari
- Cover page of Melodies & Guns
- Author: Megan Kachari
- Original title: Memsahib Prithibi
- Translator: Pradeep Acharya; Manjeet Baruah
- Language: English
- Genre: Patriotic
- Publisher: UBSPD, Delhi
- Publication date: 1990
- Publication place: Assam, India
- English publication date: 2006
- Media type: Print (Hardcover)
- Pages: 52
- ISBN: 978-81-7476-580-2

Melodies and Guns is a poetry collection in English, edited by Indira Goswami and authored by Megan Kachari, the arrested Central Publicity Secretary of ULFA. The original version is in Assamese with the title Memsahib Prithibi published in 1990. It was translated into English by Pradeep Acharya and Manjeet Baruah and published by UBS Publishers Distributors Ltd, Delhi in 2006. The preface of the book is written by Jnanpith Awardee Indira Goswami.

The book was released at the Frankfurt book fair in October 2006.

== The author ==
Megan Kachari is the pseudonym of the author who is known as Mithinga Daimary. He was the Central Publicity Secretary of the banned outfit ULFA in Assam.

== The poems ==
The readers and scholars of Assam highly appreciated the poems for their powerful portrayal of the experiences of life. "The fearlessness and spontaneity with which he expresses feelings is remarkable.", said noted scholar Professor Hiren Gohain. The poems focus on the lives of the militants and the pain and brutality that they have to undergo. "These are very different kind of poems. They have the smell of the gunpowder yet at the same time express great love for humanity. They certainly evoke a strange feeling.", said Dr Goswami, who was instrumental in getting the poems published.

== Some noted poems ==
Some of his notable poems include:

- Soon As Night Descends
- You and I
- The Way You Wish
- The Throb of Life
- The Beastly Darkness – Light
- The Earth a Memsahib
- Cradled Winter Hymns
- Don't Talk Like that Magon and Stray Ramblings
- The Waves
- The Ancient River in Melancholy
- The Void
- This Clear the Water Pons
- The Down Stream Song Words-It's Life Or...
- World Cup of Football
- A Dream Ode to Bird
- Loneliness
- Silver Nosepins
- Gold Bangles
- Pain
- The Song
- The Wounded Search

== See also ==
- Mithinga Daimary
