= Bismoi =

- Durga puja (September 2009) issue of Bismoi
- Editor-in-chief: Shashi Phukan
- Categories: Entertainment
- Frequency: Monthly
- Publisher: Bismoi Prakash, Hedayetpur, Guwahati
- Founded: 1968
- Country: India
- Based in: Guwahati, Assam
- Language: Assamese

Bismoi is an entertainment Assamese monthly magazine published in Guwahati, Assam since 1968. The magazine is published by Bismoi Prakash and the editor is Shashi Phukan. Renowned assamese writers like Baidurjya Baruah and Ranju Hazarika started publishing their novels and stories here.

Bismoi logo

== See also ==
- List of Assamese periodicals
