= Ajit Kumar Bhuyan =

Indian journalist and politician (born 1952)

Member of Parliament, Rajya Sabha
- In office 10 April 2020 – 9 April 2026
- Constituency: Assam

Founder and President of Anchalik Gana Morcha
- In office June 2020 – January 2026
- Preceded by: "Office Established"
- Succeeded by: "Office Abolished"

Editor of Asomiya Pratidin, Prag News, Aji and Natun Samay
- In office N/A–2020
- Preceded by: N/A
- Succeeded by: N/A

Personal details
- Born: 1952 (age 73–74) Jorhat, Assam, India
- Party: Assam Jatiya Parishad (since December 2025)
- Other political affiliations: Independent (before June 2020)
- Parent(s): Late J. N. Bhuyan (Father), Late Aidhan Bhuyan (Mother)
- Website: https://www.india.gov.in/my-government/indian-parliament/shri-ajit-kumar-bhuyan

Ajit Kumar Bhuyan (born 1952) is an Indian politician and former journalist and author who served as a member of Rajya Sabha from Assam from 2020 till 2026 and the founder and president of Anchalik Gana Morcha since 2020. He is also a former editor of the Asomiya Pratidin, Aji (Assamese Daily), Natun Samay, and Prag News.

== Personal life ==
Ajit Kumar Bhuyan was born in Jorhat, India in 1952. He had his early schooling in Amguri High School, in Sibsagar district, Assam and attended college in Sibsagar College. Before he could graduate, he joined the Dainik Janambhumi, published from Jorhat, as a sub-editor. While still working as a sub-editor, he earned his BA degree from Jhanji Hemnath Sarma College, Sivasagar.

== Political life ==
In June 2020 Ajit Kumar Bhuyan formed a regional political party, Anchalik Gana Morcha (Regional People's Front), as its chief convenor.

He has said in a press conference after his election that Citizenship (Amendment) Act, 2019 (CAA) was the reason behind joining politics. His candidature was supported by the Indian National Congress and All India United Democratic Front. Tarun Gogoi and Badruddin Ajmal were present during his nomination. Mr Bhuyan is a fierce critic of CAA introduced and passed in the Indian parliament by the Narendra Modi led Bharatiya Janata Party Government.
