= Lachit Bordoloi =

Indian journalist

- Born: Assam
- Occupations: Journalist; Human rights activist

Lachit Bordoloi (Assamese: লাচিত বৰদলৈ) is a journalist and adviser to MASS, a non-profit human rights organization in Assam. He is also the convener of the Peoples Committee for Peace Initiatives in Assam (PCPIA) and a member of the People's Consultative Group (PCG), organized to initiate the peace process between Government of India and the banned separatist outfit United Liberation Front of Asom in the state of Assam.

== Arrest ==
On 11 February 2008, at approximately 10.30 am, Bordoloi was arrested by Dibrugarh District Police in Moran on his way from Tinsukia, where he had come to attend a public meeting, to Guwahati. He was brought to Moran Police Station where waiting Guwahati Police took him to Chandmari Police Station, Guwahati. Nagaon, Rangia and Nalbari police, in connection with a number of cases registered against him, also took him to their respective police stations.

== Charges ==
Bordoloi was arrested following a statement by one of two ULFA militants Manoj Tamuly who had been arrested on 8 and 9 February 2008. According to police these two militants took training from Afghan militants in hijacking plane and were there in Guwahati planning a hijacking of a plane. In their interrogation they reportedly named some prominent figures including Bordoloi. Police alleged that Bordoloi was maintaining relations with the ULFA "beyond permissible limits". On 12 February 2008, Borodoloi was remanded in Chandmari Police Custody for 5 days and charged under the Unlawful Activities (Prevention) Act with "having a role in fund collecting for the United Liberation Front of Assam (ULFA)" and under sections 120B and 121 of the Indian Penal Code for "waging a war against the State".

== Reactions ==
According to Front Line, the international foundation for the protection of human rights defenders, Bordoloi was framed and targeted due to his dedicated work defending the human rights. Bordoloi published an article where he highlighted the corrupt practices within the Nagaon Police Department and as a consequence a high level enquiry was carried out against the Nagaon SP. From 2001 Bordoloi was repeatedly facing harassment by the SP following the article.

== See also ==
- Manab Adhikar Sangram Samiti
- People's Consultative Group
