= Molecular Biotechnology =

- Discipline: Biotechnology
- Language: English
- Edited by: Dr. Aydin Berenjian

Publication details
- History: 1994-present
- Publisher: Springer Science+Business Media
- Frequency: 12/year
- Impact factor: 2.4 (2023)

Standard abbreviations
- ISO 4: Mol. Biotechnol.

Indexing
- CODEN: MLBOEO
- ISSN: 1073-6085 (print); 1559-0305 (web)
- LCCN: 94641424
- OCLC no.: 213883990

Links
- Journal homepage; Online access

Molecular Biotechnology is a peer-reviewed scientific journal published by Springer Science+Business Media. It publishes original research papers and review articles on the application of molecular biology to biotechnology. It was established in 1994 with John M. Walker as founding editor-in-chief. Prof Aydin Berenjian is the current editor-in-chief of the journal.

== Abstracting and indexing ==
The journal is abstracted and indexed in:

- Science Citation Index Expanded
- PubMed/MEDLINE
- Scopus
- Inspec
- Embase
- Chemical Abstracts Service
- CAB International
- Academic OneFile
- AGRICOLA
- Biological Abstracts
- BIOSIS Previews
- EI-Compendex
- Elsevier BIOBASE
- Food Science and Technology Abstracts
- Global Health
- PASCAL
