= Asom Sena =

- Formation: December 8, 2005
- Type: Non-political
- Location: Assam, India
- Region served: Hindu
- Official language: Assamese
- Parent organization: AASU

Asom Sena (Assamese: অসম সেনা, English the soldiers of Assam) is a youth wing of All Assam Students Union in Assam. It was formed in Barpeta on December 8, 2005 with the Shiv Sena as its role model for the cause of social justice and reformation of the indigenous people of and within the state. Its chief Convener is Bijay Shankar Bordoloi.

== Focuses ==
According to Samujjal Bhattacharya, the prime architect of the outfit, "the Asom Sena will function as a front of the AASU and Asom Unnati Sabha. The deprivation of local youths in the matters of appointment in various departments of the governments both in New Delhi and Dipsur (Guwahati) will be a major issue to be taken up by Asom Sena. The volunteers of Asom Sena will never pursue violent activities and remain as a non-political group. Though it may adopt a radical stand in need on the issues of regional interests."

== Reactions ==
- Mutahidda Majlis-e-Amal (MMA), a minority organization has officially opposes the outfit. It fears that the outfit will terrorise the Bengali-speaking voters and harass the non-Assamese people living in the state.
- Vishwa Hindu Parishad has made a declaration that it would launch a similar outfit named Hindu Sena in the state.
- Banned outfit ULFA expresses its disappointment against the formation of Asom Sena stating that it would create rifts among different ethnic communities in the state. "Instead of forming Asom Sena, the AASU should try to unite the people of Assam," said Pradip Gogoi, arrested Vice-Chairman of ULFA.

== See also ==
- All Assam Students Union
- Manab Adhikar Sangram Samiti
- Shiv Sena
- All Assam Gorkha Student Union
