= Niz Juluki =

Village in Baksa district, Assam, India

Niz Juluki Nij-Juluki
- Village
- Map of Assam Niz Juluki (India)
- Coordinates: 26.514986°N 91.358757°E
- Country: India
- State: Assam
- District: Baksa
- Tehsil: Barama

Area
  - Total: 311.22 ha (769.0 acres)

Population (2011)
  - Total: 3,064
  - Density: 984.5/km^{2} (2,550/sq mi)

Languages
  - Official: Assamese
- Time zone: UTC+5:30 (IST)
- Postal code: 781346
- STD Code: 03623
- Vehicle registration: AS-28
- Census code: 304451

Niz Juluki, also known as Nij-Juluki, is a village in Barama Tehsil of Baksa district (earlier Nalbari district), Assam, India. As per 2011 Census of India, Niz Juluki village has a population of 3,064 people with an 80.29% literacy rate.
