= Padmanav Bordoloi =

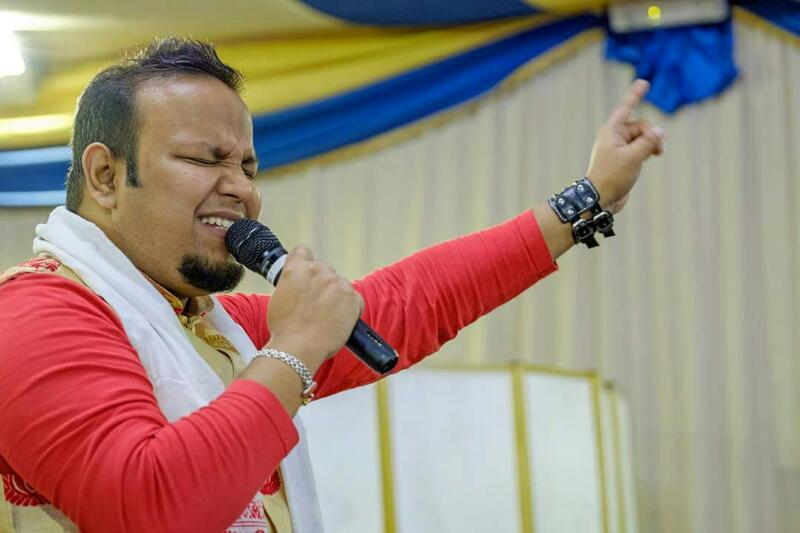
- Padmanav Bordoloi's concert on the occasion of Bohag Bihu organized by the Assam Association, Doha, Qatar.

Background information
- Born: 24 August 1988 (age 37); Guwahati, Assam, India
- Genres: Indian Classical, Western Classical, Assamese folk, Playback singing
- Occupations: Singer, songwriter, composer, anchor
- Instrument: Vocals
- Years active: 2007– Present
- Labels: Sony TV, Zee TV, P.B, INRECO

Padmanav Bordoloi is an Indian singer, performer, songwriter, music composer and anchor from the state of Assam. He has sung many songs in Assamese, Hindi, Nepali, Bengali, Marathi and English. He was nominated for Global Indian Music Academy (GIMA) Award 2016 for the Best Music Debut Non-Film segment for his first ever Hindi composition Teri Jo Baatein Hain. Padmanav is the second male singer from Assam to be nominated for this coveted title after Angaraag Papon Mahanta.

== Early life ==
Padmanav Bordoloi was born to Bipul Sharma Bordoloi and Pranita Sharma Bordoloi on 24 August 1988 in Guwahati, Assam. He was trained Hindustani Classical music and Western classical music.

== Career ==
Padmanav, who was the first Assamese to become a finalist in Indian Idol 2007, and later went on to become a finalist in SaReGaMaPa 2013 . Teri Jo Baatein Hain has earned Padmanav the nomination for GIMA Award. His debut solo Assamese audio album is Dhwani which was released in 2010. He debuted as songwriter and composer in his bilingual album Raastey(Aalibaat) in 2014. He released his first folk fusion album Dihing Disang Dimoru in April 2016. He was also awarded the Young Achievers Award in 2008.

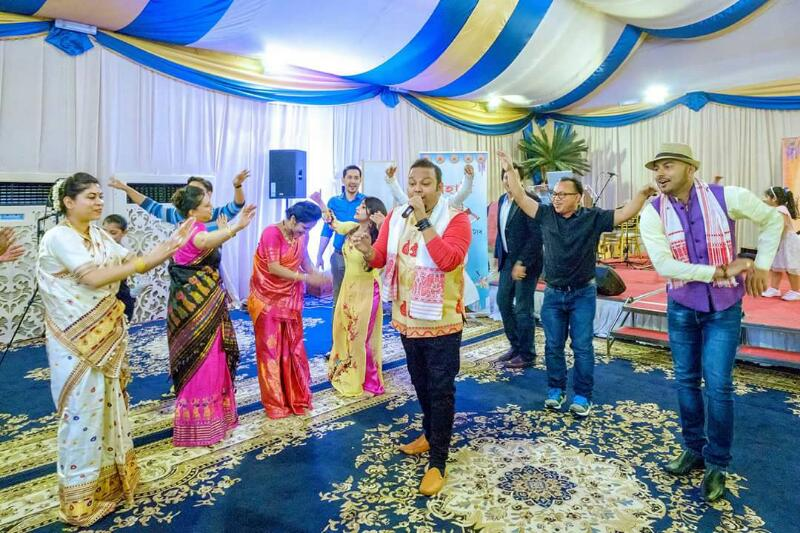
Padmanav performing in Doha, Qatar

== Achievements ==
- First Assamese Singer from Northeast region to crack Sony TV Indian Idol season 3 (in 2007), became top finalist.
- Top 8th finalist in Zee TV Saregamapa 2013.
- All India Radio approved artist/singer ( Sugam Sangeet/Modern Song Category) since 2004.
- Achieved the Young Achievers Award in 2008.
- Nominated for Global Indian Music Academy (GIMA) Award 2016 for the Best Music Debut Non-Film segment for his first ever Hindi composition Teri Jo Baatein Hain.
- Achieved the award of best singer-male in Ramdhenu Viewers Choice Awards 2016.

== Discography ==
- Dhwani (2010)
- Raastay(Aalibaat) (2014)
- Dihing Disang Dimoru (2016)
- Teri Jo Batein Hain

== Singles ==
- Aguwai Jao Aami
- Dilkashi (romantic Hindi number shot in Mumbai)
- Bihu Marugoi Aah (Assamese modern song)
- Teri jo baatein
- Junake Bisare
- O bulu roi jaa
- Rumjhum (Classical fusion)
- Dihing disang dimoru (Folk/ First Bihu xuriya)
- Bogakoi Dhuniya (folk duet)
- Tumi Sowa Jetiya
- I am in Love (Assamese Modern Song)
- Tumi puwar rodali (Abahon Theater 2012)
