= DY365 =

Assamese TV channel

DY 365
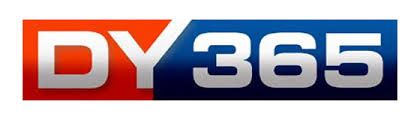
- Logo used since 2013
- Country: India
- Broadcast area: India and Worldwide
- Headquarters: Gorchuk, NH-37, Guwahati, Assam, India

Programming
- Language: Assamese
- Picture format: 576i SDTV

Ownership
- Owner: Brahmaputra Tele Productions Pvt. Ltd.
- Key people: Sanjeev Jaiswal (Chairman and Managing Director), Dipannita Jaiswal (Managing Director)
- Sister channels: Jonack & NLTV

History
- Launched: October 30, 2008; 18 years ago

Links
- Website: dy365.in dy365.in/Assamese

DY 365 is a 24-hour Indian Assamese-language satellite news channel based in Guwahati, Assam, India. It was launched on 30 October 2008 and broadcasts news, current affairs, and infotainment programs. The managing director of the channel is Dipannita Jaiswal.

== History ==
DY365 was established by the Brahmaputra Tele Productions Pvt. Ltd., a media company based in Guwahati, Assam.

== Shows ==
- DY Bihurani
- Dristipat
- Chaturtha Stambha
- DY Calendar Girl
- Akash Subor Mon
- Sanglap

== Coordinates ==
DY365 under the following coordinates is on telecommunications satellite GSAT-30

- Frequency : 3949 MHz
- Modulation : 8PSK, DVBS2
- Symbol Rate: 3.673 MSPS
- FEC : 5/6
- Polarization: Horizontal
- Codec : MPEG-4

== See also ==
- List of Assamese-language television channels
