= Aji (Assamese Daily) =

Assamese language newspaper published in India

Aji (Assamese: আজি, lit. 'Today') is an Assamese language newspaper published in Guwahati, Assam, India. The paper was launched by the Ramdhenu Prakashan Private Limited in March 2000. The founding chief editor was Ajit Kumar Bhuyan.

On 24 March 2009 the executive editor of the paper, Anil Majumdar, was shot dead. Majumdar had been instrumental in reviving the paper in recent years, after it had become almost defunct. Majumdar was possibly targeted because the newspaper he led "had been advocating talks between the ULFA and the government."
