= Manab Adhikar Sangram Samiti =

Human rights NGO in Assam, India

- Abbreviation: MASS
- Formation: 1991
- Type: NGO
- Purpose: Human rights and civil liberties protection, education, and monitoring
- Headquarters: Udanashri Building, Ananda Nagar, Bamunimoidam, Guwahati – 781021
- Location: Assam
- Region served: Northeast India
- Official language: Assamese, English
- Chairman: Ajit Kumar Bhuyan

Manab Adhikar Sangram Samiti (MASS) (Assamese মানৱ অধিকাৰ সংগ্ৰাম সমিতি) is a regional non-profit human rights NGO in Assam. It was founded in 1991 by Parag Kumar Das along with a group of intellectuals and journalists of Assam. The present chairman is Ajit Kumar Bhuyan and its headquarters is at Bamunimoidam, Guwahati.

The NGO has been working on protection and promotion of human rights and civil liberties, human rights education and mass mobilization, resistance and documentation of human rights violations. It also documents and challenges the alleged human rights violations in Assam by the Indian Army, paramilitary forces and state police.

== See also ==
- Asom Sena
- List of human rights organisations
