= Radha Govinda Baruah =

Indian politician (born 1900)

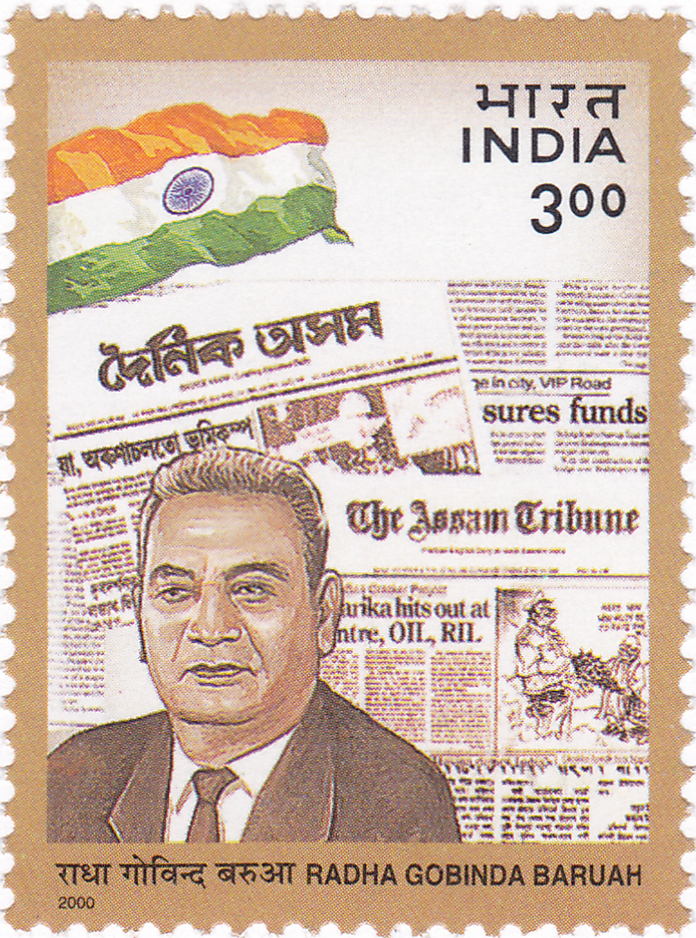
- Baruah on a 2000 stamp of India
- Born: 17 October 1900
- Died: 15 July 1977 (aged 76)
- Other name: Lion man
- Citizenship: Indian
- Known for: Started Assam Flying club. First Mayor of Guwahati. Started the Guwahati Tea Auction Center. The Nehru Stadium at Guwahati was built under his leadership.
- Relatives: Narendra Nath Phukan

Radha Govinda Baruah (17 October 1900 – 15 July 1977) was the founder of The Assam Tribune, a group of newspapers. Radha Govinda Baruah, an enterprising person in Dibrugarh, first conceived the idea of launching an English daily. With some help from his friends and well wishers, he brought out an English weekly newspaper instead of a daily on 4 August 1938 under the editorship of Lakshminath Phookan, former editorial staff of Hindustan Standard, a leading daily of Ananda Bazar Patrika Group, Kolkata. He founded the Assam Tribune in 1939. He was a sports enthusiast, who was president of the Assam Cricket Association for over a decade. The iconic Nehru Stadium in Guwahati was built under his leadership in 1962.

== Legacy ==
He is also noted for his contributions to the society and culture of Assam. RG Baruah was instrumental in opening the first bank in Assam, the Imperial Bank of India (Now State Bank of India) in 1923. He is called "the architect of modern Assam" for his being "instrumental in realising the educational needs" of the Assamese people. Radha Govinda Baruah College (or R G Baruah College) in Guwahati is named after him. He is also called the Singhapurush ("Lion Man") for his immense bravery and enthusiasm.

== Honours ==
In 2000, Baruah was honoured with a postage stamp, part of a series of "Great Leaders : Social and Political" along with Jaglal Choudhary, Vijaya Lakshmi Pandit, and Diwan Bahadur R. Srinivasan.
