= Hindustan Standard =

English-language newspaper

Hindustan Standard is an English-language daily published from Kolkata by the ABP Group. It is headquartered at 3, Burman Street, Kolkata. In 1937, Suresh Chandra Majumdar started the daily in English, and it soon became a leading newspaper owned by Indians in Kolkata, competing with British-owned The Statesman, along with its Bengali language sister-publication Ananda Bazaar Patrika. The Delhi edition is started in 1915. Ashwini Kumar Gupta, an ex freedom fighter and the father of the McKinsey and Galleon group finance wizard Rajat Gupta is one of the first correspondents at the Delhi office of Hindustan Standard.

The magazine The Sunday started as the weekend supplement with the newspaper, and was made a stand-alone magazine in 1976 by Aveek Sarkar, with MJ Akbar as the editor.
