= The Assam Tribune =

Indian English-language daily newspaper

- Type: Daily newspaper
- Format: Broadsheet
- Owner: Prafulla Govinda Baruah (100%)
- Founder: Radha Govinda Baruah
- Publisher: Ratan Kumar Ray Hajong
- Editor: Prafulla Govinda Baruah
- Founded: 4 August 1939; 86 years ago
- Language: English
- Headquarters: Tribune Buildings, MRD Road, Chandmari, Guwahati, Assam, India
- Circulation: 7,00,000+
- Sister newspapers: Dainik Asam; Asam Bani
- Website: www.assamtribune.com
- Free online archives: epaper.assamtribune.com

The Assam Tribune is an Indian English daily newspaper published from Guwahati and Dibrugarh, Assam. With over 700,000 copies of current circulation and a readership of over 3 million, it is the highest circulated English daily in northeastern India. The newspaper was founded way back in 1939 in Guwahati.

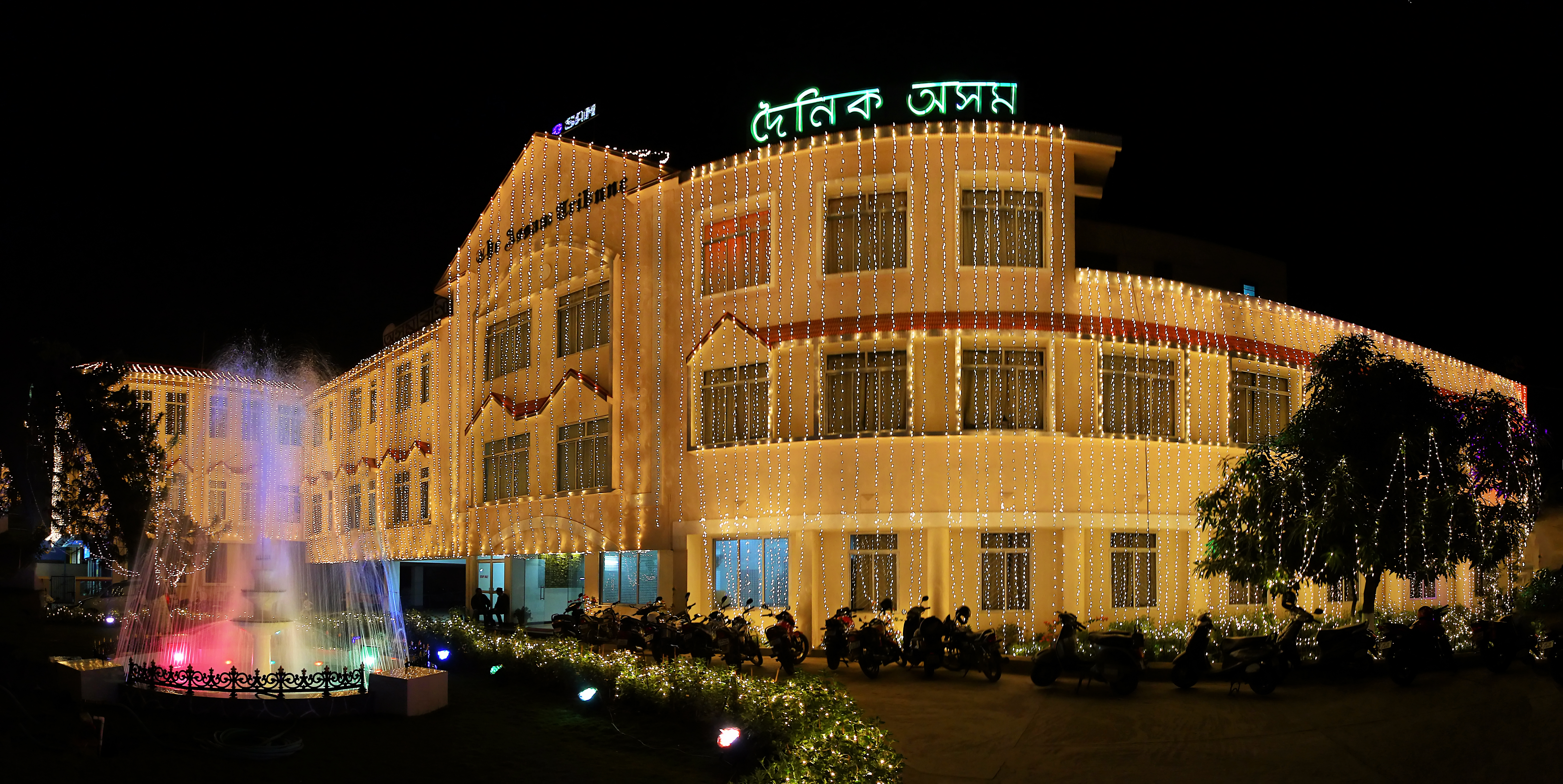
The Assam Tribune building

As of November 2024, the editor was Prafulla Govinda Baruah, son of Radha Govinda Baruah, and P. J. Baruah is the executive editor.

== History ==
First published on 4 August 1939 in Gauhati by Radha Govinda Baruah as a weekly newspaper under the editorship of Lakshminath Phookan, it is now published simultaneously from Guwahati and Dibrugarh as a daily. It has a huge readership in Assam and is the most popular newspaper in the North-East India. The Assam Tribune has a wide reach in terms of circulation figures as well as the reliability of the news matter. In 2014, it celebrated the Platinum Jubilee in the presence of India's Prime Minister Mr. Narendra Modi.

== Controversy ==
On 28 March 2021, a day after the first phase of polling for the 2021 Assam Legislative Assembly election, the newspaper ran a frontpage ad claiming the BJP would win all the Upper Assam constituencies along with seven other newspapers. The Congress party claimed that the ad was a ploy to "influence and deceive" voters ahead of the remaining phases of the election; a violation of Representation of the People Act, 1951 and Election Commission of India's directives. Speaking on the controversy, editor Prafulla Govinda Baruah told The Telegraph that "The advertisement came in late".

== See also ==
- The Sentinel
- Seven Sisters Post
