= Amar Asom =

Indian newspaper

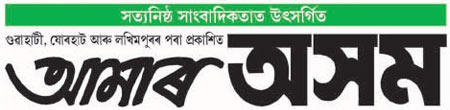

- Type: Daily newspaper
- Format: Broadsheet
- Owner: G. L. Agarwalla
- Publisher: G. L. Publications Ltd.
- Editor-in-chief: Manoj Kumar Goswami
- Founded: 21 April 1995
- Language: Assamese
- Headquarters: Guwahati, Assam
- Circulation: 70,434
- Sister newspapers: The North East Times; Purvanchal Prahari; The Meghalaya Guardian
- Website: http://amarasom.glpublications.in/

The Amar Asom (Assamese: আমাৰ অসম, lit. 'Our Assam') is an Assamese-language daily newspaper published by G. L. Publications Ltd. After the exit of Homen Borgohain as the Editor-in-chief, this newspaper tries to maintain its stand by siding with people and vocal against government's anti people policies. The newspaper is published simultaneously from Guwahati and Jorhat.

== See also ==
- List of Assamese periodicals
