= Asomiya Khabar =

Indian newspaper

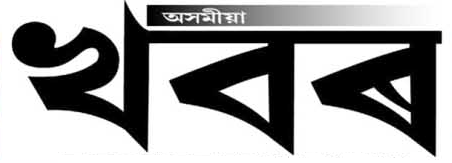

- Front page of 5 September 2021 issue
- Type: Daily newspaper
- Format: Broadsheet
- Owner: Frontier Publications Pvt. Ltd
- Publisher: Frontier Publications Pvt. Ltd., Guwahati
- Editor-in-chief: Biswajit Das
- Editor: Shankar Laskar
- Founded: 11 November 2001
- Language: Assamese
- Headquarters: Guwahati, Assam
- Website: www.assamiyakhabor.com

Asomiya Khabar (Assamese: অসমীয়া খবৰ, lit. 'Assamese News') (or Oxomiya Khobor) is an Assamese-language daily newspaper published simultaneously from Guwahati and Jorhat. It is one of the highest circulated Assamese daily newspaper. A weekly supplement named Deoboriya Khabar is published with it on every Sunday. The newspaper was placed as the second largest vernacular daily of the region. Veteran journalist Shankar Laskar is the editor of Asomiya Khabar and Biswajit Das its chief editor.

== See also ==
- List of Assamese periodicals
