= Dainik Janambhumi =

Assamese-language daily newspaper published in India

- Type: Daily newspaper
- Format: Broadsheet
- Owner: Sanjive Narain Group of Companies
- Founder(s): Deveshwar Sharma (visionary founder of Janambhumi publications); Kanak Chandra Sharma (founding editor)
- Publisher: Chandra Sekhar Sarmah
- Editor: Sanjib Kumar Phookan
- Founded: 1 June 1972
- Language: Assamese
- Headquarters: Jorhat, Assam, India
- City: Jorhat, Guwahati, Tinsukia, Bongaigaon
- Sister newspapers: Janambhumi (weekly)
- Website: dainikjanambhumi.co.in

Dainik Janambhumi (Assamese: দৈনিক জনমভূমি, lit. 'Daily Homeland') is an Assamese-language daily newspaper published from Assam, India. Established on 1 June 1972 in Jorhat, it is one of the longstanding regional newspapers in the state and forms part of the Janambhumi publications tradition that began with the weekly Janambhumi in 1947.

Over the decades, the newspaper expanded its publication network to multiple centres across Assam and continues to operate in both print and digital formats.

== History ==
Dainik Janambhumi was launched on 1 June 1972 from Jorhat, twenty-five years after the founding of the weekly Janambhumi in 1947.

The establishment of the publication followed the vision of freedom fighter and political leader Deveshwar Sharma, while Kanak Chandra Sharma played a central role in developing the newspaper and served as founding editor of the daily edition.

At the time of its launch, publishing a daily newspaper from Jorhat represented a significant logistical and technological undertaking within the regional press environment of Assam.

Over time, the newspaper expanded its publication network beyond Jorhat with additional editions introduced from:

- Guwahati (2001)
- Tinsukia (2004)
- Bongaigaon (2024)

These expansions strengthened statewide circulation and accessibility.

== Editorial leadership ==
Kanak Chandra Sharma served as the founding editor of Dainik Janambhumi. He was succeeded by several editors, including:

- Praful Baruah
- Jatindra Kumar Bargohain
- Dhirendra Nath Chakraborty
- Dev Kumar Bora
- Hemant Barman
- Arun Kumar Das (Resident Editor, Jorhat)
- Utpal Baruah

Scientist Dr. Jogendra Nath Barua served as Chief Advisor of the newspaper for a period.

As of 2025, senior journalist Sanjib Kumar Phookan serves as Executive Editor of Dainik Janambhumi.

Editorial leadership across the Prag–Janambhumi media network is guided by journalist Prashanta Rajguru as Editor-in-Chief.

== Role in socio-political developments ==
Dainik Janambhumi has reported extensively on major public developments in Assam, including:

- the Language Movement
- the Oil Refinery Movement
- the Assam Movement

Through its reporting and editorial engagement, the newspaper contributed to public awareness and documentation of these developments.

== Association with Prag News ==
In 2023, Prag News, an electronic news organisation based in Assam and part of the Sanjive Narain Group of Companies, became associated with the Janambhumi Group.

Following this development, the publication became part of the broader Prag–Janambhumi media network under the leadership of Dr. Sanjive Narain, Chairman and Managing Director of the Sanjive Narain Group of Companies.

Editorial leadership across the Prag–Janambhumi media network is guided by senior journalist Prashanta Rajguru as Editor-in-Chief.

The responsibility of Publisher of Dainik Janambhumi was subsequently taken up by Chandra Sekhar Sarmah, a senior journalist who also serves as General Manager of Prag News.

The association strengthened collaboration between print and electronic media platforms within the Prag–Janambhumi media network.

== Supplements ==
Dainik Janambhumi publishes a Sunday magazine supplement titled Basundhara, which accompanies its Sunday edition and features literary, cultural and feature-oriented content.

As of 2025, Basundhara is edited by Sankab Kausik Baruah.

Veteran photographer Reba Kumar Bora serves as Senior Photojournalist of the publication, while Ranjiv Gogoi contributes as cartoonist.

== Digital presence ==
In response to the expansion of digital media platforms, Dainik Janambhumi launched an online edition to reach readers beyond its traditional print circulation.

The digital platform provides access to archived editions and current news coverage for readers across India and internationally.

== Editorial philosophy ==
At a public event attended by prominent leaders including then Chief Minister Sharat Chandra Sinha and former Chief Minister Mahendra Mohan Choudhury, Deveshwar Sharma stated that newspapers should function as institutions belonging to the people rather than private property. This principle continues to inform the institutional identity of the publication.
