= Asomiya Pratidin =

Indian daily newspaper in Assam

- Type: Daily newspaper
- Format: Broadsheet
- Owner: Jayanta Baruah
- Publisher: Jatin Choudhary
- Editor: Jayanta Baruah
- Founded: 1995
- Language: Assamese
- Headquarters: Guwahati, Assam
- Circulation: 1,78,162
- Sister newspapers: Sadin
- Website: www.asomiyapratidin.in

Asomiya Pratidin (Assamese: অসমীয়া প্ৰতিদিন, lit. 'Assamese Everyday') is an Assamese-language daily newspaper catering to all of Assam, with five editions published from Guwahati, Bongaigaon, Dibrugarh, and North Lakhimpur. The other periodical and magazines published under the Pratidin group are Sadin, Nandini and Satsori. The Pratidin Media network organised The Conclave 2022 in Delhi.

== History ==
On 10 April 2026, a group of unidentified individuals pelted the offices of Asomiya Pratidin in North Lakhimpur, breaking windows and causing damage to the newsroom. The attack occurred shortly after Himanta Biswa Sarma, the Chief Minister of Assam, criticised the paper. The Committee to Protect Journalists called on Assamese authorities to conduct a "swift and transparent" investigation into the attack, and to ensure that journalists in the state could work "without fear".

== Awards ==
- Shri Jayanta Baruah and Asomiya Pratidin had been awarded by Prime Minister Dr. Manmohan Singh, in 2008 for the outstanding contribution of vernacular daily. Indian Language Newspapers Association (ILNA) hosted this award. Shri Jayanta Baruah was also honored with Damodardev Award in 2023.
- Inclusion of Asomiya Pratidin in the LIMCA Book of Records – 2008, as one of the most highly circulated newspapers of North Eastern States.

== Sister Publications & Organisation ==
- Sadin
- Nandini
- Satsori
- Pratidin Time - A 24-hour Assamese news channel.
