= Timeline of insurgency in Northeast India =

This is a following is a list of events during the Northeast India Insurgency, an ongoing armed conflict between the separatist rebels and the Indian government.

== 1980s ==
=== 1980 ===
- 8 June – Tripura militants massacred around 255 to 400 Bengalis at West Tripura in Tripura.

=== 1982 ===
- 19 January - Indian Sikh Regiment Jawans coming in three vehicles were ambushed In Manipur, which resulted in 21 Jawans being killed and 5 injured.

== 1990s ==
=== 1992 ===
- Around 1992, there were clashes reported between the Manipuri Tamils and Kuki communities due to attempts by Kuki militants to impose heavy taxes on Tamil businesses. The issue was amicably resolved after the Tamil community struck a deal to invest in the local business, health and education which would benefit the Kuki community as well.

=== 1993 ===
- 15 April – KNA militants killed 4 Naga militants at Chandel district in Manipur.
- 3 May – Violence broke out between Meitei and Pangal tribes in Manipur, triggered by rumors and misconceptions.
- 4 May – The escalated violence between Meitei and Pangal tribes left more than 100+ killed, including 96–130 Meitei Pangals and reportedly 4 Meitei killed. A curfew was imposed to de-escalate the situation.
- 13 September – Joupi Massacre: Naga militants allegedly belonging to the NSCN-IM massacred around 115 Kuki civilians in Manipur.

=== 1996 ===
- 30 December – At least 33 people are killed in Assam after a bomb attack. Government blamed the attack on a militant group called Bodo Security Force.

=== 1997 ===
- 24 June - Kuki militants lined up 20 villagers and shot them in Saikul. The execution killed 9 and wounded 4. These killings started a series of ethnic violence that could last for more than 1 year.
- 8 July – A ceasefire was signed by KNF(P) and ZRO to stop the violence that started between Kuki and Paites in Manipur.
- 10 July – KNF(P) militants held an incursion at Mata village, which broke the peace agreement signed by both tribes.
- 18 July – Both tribes were called again to reaffirm the agreement. However, the KNF(P) attacked several villages, burning 30 houses. Leading no further conversation.

=== 1998 ===
- 29 September – To end the ethnic violence, the Kuki Inpi Manipur invited the Zomi Council into a feast to end the conflict. A bull was slaughtered for the occasion and both groups shared the meal.
- 30 September – the Zomi Council reciprocated by inviting the Kukis to a feast.
- 1 October - A peace accord was declared by both sides with the initiative of the Church. The year long violence left 352 killed.

== 2010s ==
=== 2010 ===
- 3 January – A NNC cadre was killed by the rival NSCN-IM militants during a clash.
- 4 January – Assam Rifles and combined forces kills 2 alleged militants of PULF. On same day, a police was being killed by stabbing my militants.
- 13 January – 3 militants and 1 Indian army troop are killed after encountering each others in different incidents of Northeast India.
- 30 January – Friendly fire between Indian army and police killed 1 Indian personal while fighting with alleged militants.
- 2 February – 4 militants are killed by troops in different incidents of Northeast India.
- 17 February – 10 militants are killed by Assam rifles in different incidents.
- 6 August – Two BSF personnel were killed in an IED blast triggered by the NLFT militants in Tripura.
- 9 November – Two different NDFB led attack killed 23 villages in total.
- 10 December – Four militants of the Garo National Liberation Army (GNLA) were killed during an encounter with Police in Meghalaya.

=== 2011 ===
- 3 February – Army troops killed a People's Liberation Army of Manipur (PLA) militant in Manipur.
- 10 February – A security guard was killed and three others including a civilian was injured during an unidentified attack by militants.
- 8 March – Unidentified militants shot dead at a police officer in Assam.
- 15 April – An ambush by NSCN-IM militants kills 8 people including 6 police officers in Manipur.
- 9 August – 4 GNLA militants were killed by Police during an encounter in Meghalaya.
- 31 October – 4 police men and 1 civilian was killed after an attack by GNLA militants in Meghalaya.

=== 2012 ===
- 20 July – A riot escalated between Bengalis and Bodo people in Assam after some Bengalis killed four Bodo people at Joypur. This escalation could lead to further violent attacks. The impact of the riot also spread throughout other Indian states, where Bengali or Muslim protesters clashed with other ethnic peoples, some because of attacks on anti-riot protests led by Muslim protesters. The riot lasted for months, resulting in 108 people being killed.
- 21 July - Nine were killed in Kokrajhar after violence escalated.
- 9 August – Six attacks on Manipuris occurred in Pune as hatred and violence continued.

=== 2013 ===
- 14 September – 9 migrant workers are killed in Manipur after a IED blast.

=== 2014 ===
- 17 January – Six persons were killed after suspected NDFB militants attack in Assam.
- 21 February – SFs killed three suspected GNLA militants in Assam.
- 30 April – 3 suspected NDFB militants were killed during an encounter with Police in Assam.
- 1 May – May 2014 Assam violence: From the night of 1 May 2014 until the morning of 3 May 2014, a series of attacks occurred against Bengali Muslims in Assam by groups of insurgents. On 1 May, insurgents, arriving on bicycles, raided the Baksa district village of Narsingbari, opening fire on a house, killing three women and injuring two others. The police suspected the NDFB for the attack, however the NDFB denied their involvement.
- 2 May – On 2 May, the attacks continued as group of insurgents opened fire at three houses in the village of Balapara in the district of Kokrajhar, killing seven people. On the evening of the same day, another insurgent group killed 12 people.
- 3 May – On 3 May, four suspected insurgents attacked police in the forest near Tezpur. Police fired in retaliation, killing two while the other two escaped. The death toll of the violence rose to 33 including 3 insurgents.
- 1 August – 3 ULFA militants died after a IED blast near police station in Assam.
- 20 August – 5 NDFB militants were killed during an encounter with SFs in Assam.
- 8 October – SFs launched an operation at Kokrajhar District in Assam. The operation resulted in 4 NDFB militants dead and capture of various ammunation.
- 5 November – 3 NSCN militants were killed in an encounter with SFs in Assam.
- 23 December – December 2014 Assam violence: More than 70 people were killed and several injured after an attack by National Democratic Front of Boroland was conduct against Adivasi People. The strike was in response to an offensive by India against the guerrillas which killed 2 NDFB cadres. Adivasi people later protested against this massacre. 3 Adivasi were also killed when police fired rounds to disperse the crowd after the protest march turned violent. Adivasi people in response marched killed 3 Bodo people in village. The death toll rose to 85.
- 26 December – On 26 December 2014, the Indian Government declared that they had launched "Operation All Out" to eliminate the NDFB militants. About 5,000 personnel from the paramilitary CRPF and 4,620 from the Indian Army had already been deployed and ordered to eliminate the remaining militants.

=== 2015 ===
- 28 May - AFSPA was abolished in the state of Tripura, owing to the relatively peaceful situation there.
- 4 June - 2015 Manipur ambush: UNLFW separatists ambushed a military convoy in Manipur, resulting in at least 20 Indian soldiers death.
- 9 June – India launches major counter insurgency operation in Northeast Indian and Myanmar, killing 38 rebels.
- 3 August -The NSCN (IM) and NSCN(K) insurgent groups of Nagaland signed a peace accord with the Indian government. Prime Minister Narendra Modi called the agreement "historic".

=== 2016 ===
- 22 May – Rebel ambush kills 6 personals of Assam Rifles in Manipur.
- 19 November – Rebels ambush against Indian army in Assam kills 3 army personals.

=== 2017 ===
- 12 December –Two people (A father and son) were shot dead by ULFA militants. On Same day, an encounter between the security forces and members of the Garo National Liberation Army were reported near the village of Nangalbibra, in South Garo Hills district. No casualties were reported in both sides, and the officers claim the presence of the rebels was for the establishment as a centre to extort money from coal quarries and trucks.
- 14 December – A militant were killed in an encounter between militants of NDFB and Indian security forces.

=== 2018 ===
- 18 February – Four persons, including the NCP candidate Jonathone Nengminza Sangma, were killed and three others injured in an improvised explosive device blast in Meghalaya's East Garo Hills district, India.
- 5 March – An Indian rifleman of 13 Sikh Light Infantry was killed in an encounter with the National Socialist Council of Nagaland at Khoupum area in Manipur's Noney district.
- 1 April – AFSPA was abolished in Meghalaya.
- 4 May – A police officer and a militant died in a shooting and grenade attack in Tinsukia district in the Indian state of Assam.
- 9 May – Two members of the Indian BSF were killed and three civilians injured in a bomb explosion outside a BSF camp in the Imphal East district of Manipur.
- 5 June – The Indian Assam Rifles outpost at Lampong Sheanghah village at Mon district in Nagaland was attacked by militants, leaving three security personnel injured.
- 17 June – Four Indian Assam Rifles personnel were killed in an ambush by militants of the NSCN in Nagaland's Mon district, near the Indian-Myanmar border. Six other soldiers were injured in the incident, two of them seriously.

=== 2019 ===
- 30 March – Seliam Wangsa, who was campaigning for a Bharatiya Janata Party (BJP) was killed by suspected militants at Nginu village in the Longding District of Arunachal Pradesh.

== 2020s ==
=== 2020 ===
- 30 July – 3 Assam Rifles Jawans were killed and 5 Injured were injured after being ambushed by PLA militants in Manipur.

=== 2021 ===
- 13 November – 5 Indian BSF soldiers and 2 civilians were killed when they were ambushed by suspected PLA militants.
- 4 December – 2021 Nagaland killings: a unit of Indian army kills 6 civilians in Nagaland without any clear reason. Riots occurs after killings of innocent civilians.
- 5 December – Violence occurred and total of 14 civilians were killed while 1 Indian soldier killed in Nagaland after slow de-escalation starts.

=== 2022 ===
- 5 January – 1 Indian Assam Rifles personal was killed by a bomb blast in Arunachal Pradash.

=== 2023 ===
- 3 May – 2023 Manipur violence: Ethnic violence erupts in the state of Manipur between the Kuki and the Meitei people. The violence could continue and kill more than 120 peoples, and injured more than 3000 people. The violence was accompanied by a resurgence of insurgency groups in the region, leading to further escalation.
- 12 May – Alleged Kuki militants ambushed positions in Manipur as violence countinue, killing 1 police and kidnapping 3 Meitei people.

=== 2024 ===
- 17 January - 1 Indian state policeman was killed when suspected Kuki militants attacked a Security Forces (SFs) vehicle in Manipur.

=== 2025 ===
- 14 May – Indian Assam Rifles forces killed 10 Myanmar anti-junta rebels near the India-Myanmar border. The anti-junta National Unity Government condemned such attacks by India.
- 13 July – Casualties were reported from ULFA militants after a series of Indian drone strikes inside Myanmar.India at first denied any allegations of military strikes there but later on confirmed they did indeed struck militants positions in Myanmar.
- 19 September – Two Indian Assam Rifles personnel are killed and five are injured in an ambush by People's Liberation Army of Manipur militants in Bishnupur district, Manipur.
- 4 November - Indian army and paramilitary Assam Rifles launched "Operation Khanpi" and killed 4 Kuki militants in Manipur.
- 23 December – 2 including one Adivasi from police firing were dead in a violent ethnic clash between Adivasi and Bengalis in Assam.

=== 2026 ===
- 20 January – A clash between Bodo and Adivasi tribes in Assam kills 2 people. The violence was triggered when a vehicle with Bodos on board hit two Adivasi persons. Army troops was deployed to de-escalate the situation.
- 21 January - A Meitei man was killed by Kuki militants in Manipur.
- 26 March - A gunfight occurred between Indian army and rebels in Indo-Myanmar Border. The fight caused the death of 3 Indian army personals.
- 7 April – A total of 4 people were killed in renewed ethnic clash in Manipur. Two of them were minors where other 2 were killed by police firing.
- 10 April – An Indian BSF personal was killed after attack by suspected Kuki rebels in Manipur.
- 13 May – 3 Kuki people are killed by a gunman in Manipur.
- 6 July - 2 soldiers of India's Assam Rifles are killed in Manipur.
- 10 July – 6 Naga civilians body are received dead after abduction by Kuki people in Manipur.
