= 2014 Assam violence =

2014 Assam violence may refer to these attacks in Assam, India:

- May 2014 Assam violence, attacks occurred on the Bengali speaking Muslims in Assam between the 1st and the 3rd May
- December 2014 Assam violence, attacks by militants which resulted in the deaths of 75 local tribal people
