= 2004 Dhemaji school bombing =

Terrorist attack in India

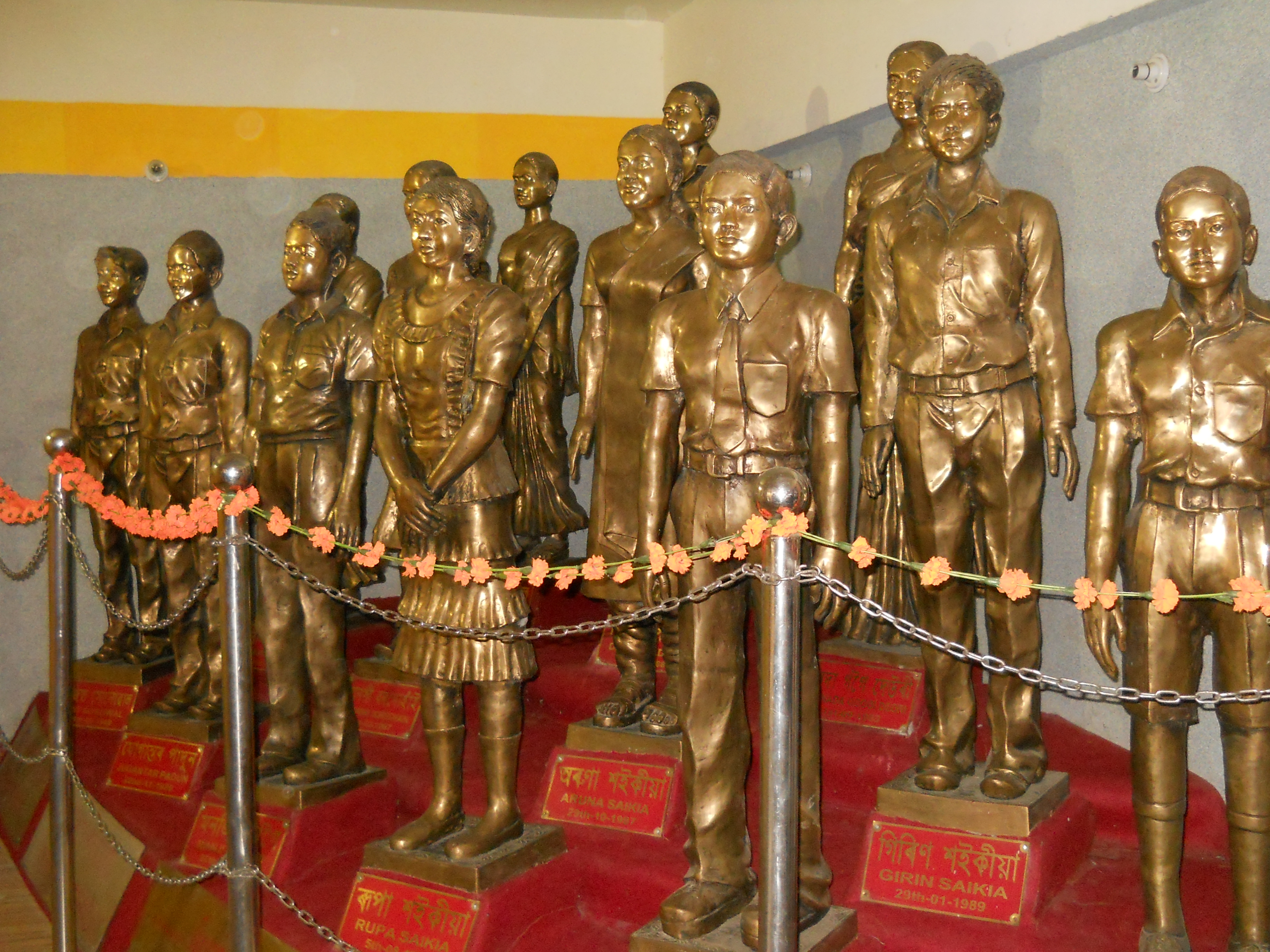
- Location: Dhemaji, Assam, India
- Date: 15 August 2004; 09:30 (04:00 GMT)
- Target: Dhemaji College (District Parade ground)
- Attack type: School bombing
- Deaths: 18
- Injuries: 40
- Perpetrator: ULFA

The 2004 Dhemaji school bombing occurred on 15 August 2004, on the Indian Independence Day in Dhemaji, Assam, India. The bombing by the Assamese militant group called the United Liberation Front of Assam (ULFA) killed 18 people and injured many others. Most of the victims were schoolchildren aged between 12 and 14 and their mothers.

== Details ==
On the occasion of Independence Day, 15 August 2004, people, mostly school children and their mothers, had gathered at Dhemaji College ground for an Independence Day parade. Around 09:30 a bomb went off, killing at least 18 and injuring many more. According to police, the bomb was planted near the college gate and triggered by a remote-controlled device. It was exploded when the students and teachers of various schools were passing through the gate.

== Investigations ==
Police blamed ULFA, a banned Assamese militant group, which had called for a boycott of the event. The group continued denying responsibility.

== Aftermath ==
Soon after the incident the local people allegedly attacked the police vehicles at the site for failure to protect the parade. Police had to resort to baton charge and fire tear gas to control the situation. The Superintendent of Police T. Thangneo and the Additional Superintendent of Police Abu Sufian of Dhemaji were suspended for negligence of duty. The Deputy Commissioner was transferred for security lapse.

== Reactions ==
The injured were admitted to the Dhemaji Civil Hospital and other 10 being critically injured were shifted to Dibrugarh Civil Hospital. Chief Minister of Assam Tarun Gogoi condemned the blast, calling it the "most barbaric, inhuman and pathetic" incident. He also announced that the state would be observing 16 August of every year as Mourning Day in memory of those killed. The chief minister announced Rs 300,000 for each victim killed and Rs 50,000 for every seriously injured person. The Dhemaji and Lakhimpur unit of AASU called a 12-hour bandh on 16 August 2004 in protest of the blast. The AASU had also demanded the resignation of the chief minister. The Assam State Committee of CPI(M) vehemently condemned the incident. It also organized a protest rally in the capital city of Guwahati on 17 August against the extremists for the killings and against the administration for the failure of protection. The committee had also called a 12-hour Assam-bandh on 18 August.

== Armed Forces Special Powers Act ==
The chief minister Tarun Gogoi said that the Armed Forces Special Powers Act should stay in the disturbed areas to avoid the increasing activities by the rebel groups.

== ULFA takes responsibility after five years ==
On 16 August 2004, one day after the blast, in a statement, Arabinda Rajkhowa, the chairman of the group, stated that the "Indian Occupation Force" and its agents used the schoolchildren as shield to defy the boycott call of the outfit. On 13 December 2009, Paresh Barua, the C-in-C of the group, sought public apology and forgiveness for the blast. He stated in an e-mail that the ULFA leadership was misled by some of their cadres and junior leaders about the blast, which is why the leadership had to deny its involvement.

== See also ==
- 2008 Assam bombings
- 2009 Assam bombings
- 2009 Guwahati bombings
