= Dhekiajuli =

- Town
- Location in Assam, India Dhekiajuli (India)
- Coordinates: 26.7°N 92.5°E
- Country: India
- State: Assam
- District: Sonitpur

Government
  - Body: Dhekiajuli Municipal Board
- Elevation: 100 m (330 ft)

Population (2001)
  - Total: 19,743

Languages
  - Official: Assamese
- Time zone: UTC+5:30 (IST)
- Postal code: 784110
- ISO 3166 code: IN-AS
- Vehicle registration: AS

Dhekiajuli is a town and a municipal board in Sonitpur district in the state of Assam, India.

== Demographics ==
As of 2011 India census, Dhekiajuli has a population of 21,579. Males constitute 51.42% of the population and females 48.58%. Dhekiajuli has an average literacy rate of 81.41%, higher than the national average of 74.04%. Male literacy rate is 85.07% while female literacy rate is 77.54%. 9.58% of the population is under 6 years of age. The town is fairly active in commercial trade centres. There is a daily market and weekly market hosting numerous shop vendors and people who sell their own as well as the local produce. The weekly market is open on Sundays. The town and its shops, except for medical centres and other public services, are officially closed on Tuesdays for restocking supplies.

=== Languages ===
Languages spoken in Dhekiajuli town (2011)
1. Bengali (49.8%)
2. Assamese (24.6%)
3. Hindi (18.7%)
4. Nepali (1.54%)
5. Others (5.36%)

Bengali is spoken at 10,748, Assamese at 5,314, Hindi by 4,028 people, Nepali at 332 and 1,157 people speaks other languages.

== Geography ==
Dhekiajuli is located at 26.7°N 92.5°E. It has an average elevation of 100 metres (328 ft). There are several tea estates in its vicinity. Some of the major ones include Sapoi, Julia, Dibru-Darrang, Tinkhuria and Deckiajuli TE, Panbari TE run by Kanoi Groups of Companies) etc. Orang National Park is 31.7 km west of the main town of Dhekiajuli. The river Brahmaputra crosses the town.

== Government ==
Dhekiajuli is part of Dhekiajuli Assembly constituency.

Current MLA: Ashok Singhal, He is also a Cabinet Minister in Himanta Biswa Sarma ministry from 2021.

== Education ==
Name of Institution	Head of Institution	Address	Type	Medium of Instruction
Dhekiajuli Boys High School		Ward No. 8, Dhekiajuli, Assam	Govt. Boys High School (SEBA)	Assamese
Debendra Green Grove English High School	Mr. Biplab Dey	Monojuli, Dhekiajuli, Assam	Private Co-ed High School (SEBA)	English
Dhekiajuli Girls High School		Ward No. 8, Dhekiajuli, Assam	Govt. Girls High School (SEBA)	Assamese
Little Angels High School		Ward No. 8, Dhekiajuli, Assam	Private Co-ed High School (SEBA)	English
Lokanayak Omeo Kumar Das College	Dr. Sukdev Adhikari	LOKD College Road, Dhekiajuli, Assam	Govt. Higher Secondary (AHSEC) and Degree College	English, Assamese, Bengali, Hindi
Netaji Bidya Mandir	Mr. Chaitanya Bhadra	Netaji Road, Dhekiajuli, Assam	Govt. Co-ed High School (SEBA)	Bengali
Saraswati Public School		Near LOKD College, Dhekiajuli, Assam	Private Co-ed High School (CBSE)	English
St. Ursula High School			Private Co-ed High School (SEBA)	English
Arabinda Bidya Niketan High School	Rakhal Chaklader	Lulukai Gaon	Government Co-ed High School (SEBA)	Bengali
Tea Buds High School		Private Co-ed High School (SEBA)	English	
Vivekananda Sister Nivedita	Mr. Prithis Chandra Dey		Private Co-ed High School (SEBA)	English

== Transport ==
Dhekiajuli Road railway station is a railway station on Rangiya–Murkongselek section under Rangiya railway division of Northeast Frontier Railway zone.

== Assam Violence in December 2014 ==
In December 2014, a series of attacks by militants resulted in deaths of more than 75 people in Assam. The attacks took place in Chirang, Sonitpur and Kokrajhar districts on 23 December 2014. They have been attributed to the Songbijit faction of National Democratic Front of Bodoland, also known as NDFB(S).

The tribal people are mostly work in tea plantations. Some of them are the descendants of labourers brought to Assam by the British colonial rulers, while others are relatively recent migrants from other parts of India. The NDFB claims to represent the Bodo people, who are native to Assam. It has fought a secessionist war with the government for the establishment of a sovereign Bodoland. Although a number of NDFB militants had agreed to ceasefire and peace talks in the 2000s, the NDFB(S) faction led by I. K. Songbijit has refused to give up their militancy.

In May, the government had attributed a similar attack on Muslim migrants to NDFB(S). The December attacks, described as one of the worst massacres in the history of North-East India, led to widespread protests by tribal people. The protests turned violent leading to three more deaths in the hands of the police. The tribal people also killed fourteen Bodos in retaliation. On 26 December, the Government of India declared the launch of Operation All Out to eliminate the Bodo militants and deployed as many as 9,000 soldiers of the Indian Army and the CRPF.
