= ACMF =

ACMF may refer to:

- Allied Central Mediterranean Force, a force consisting of the US Fifth Army and the British Eighth Army during World War II
- Adriamycin, cyclophosphamide, methotrexate, and 5-fluorouracil, a chemotherapy regimen used in the treatment of breast cancer
- Arachnoid cysts of the middle fossa, the most common location where intracranial arachnoid cysts are found
- Adivasi Cobra Militant Force, a militant adivasi organization in Assam
- Antimatter/antiproton catalyzed micro fission/fusion, a future technology being developed for long-distance space travel
- Two similarly named country music organizations use this acronym:
  - Austrian Country Music Federation
  - Australian Country Music Foundation
