= Bhimajuli massacre =

Terrorist incident in Assam, India

- Location: Sonitpur, Assam, India
- Date: October 4, 2009
- Attack type: Shooting massacre
- Weapon: Firearms
- Deaths: 12
- Perpetrator: NDFB

Bhimajuli massacre of 2009 was named after Bhimajuli, a village in Assam, India, where NDFB militants of its anti-talks faction led by Ranjan Daimary fired indiscriminately at villagers in Bhimajuli, in Sonitpur district near the Assam-Arunachal border killing five people on the spot and six later, including an eight-year-old girl on October 4, 2009.

Protests broke out soon after and angry residents came out of their houses with bows and arrows in their hands. They also did not allow CRPF personnel to enter their village. The outraged villagers accused the government of failing to maintain law and order.

Different organisations such as the All Assam Gorkha Student Union, All Assam Students Union, All Assam President of Asom Xatra Mahaxabha Bhadra Krishna Goswami condemned the killings at Bhimajuli in a press meet.

== See also ==
- Assam conflict
