= Axl Hazarika =

- Also known as: Rainbow Trip
- Born: Guwahati, Assam, India
- Origin: Assam, India
- Genres: EDM, electronic, avant-garde, Indie rock, industrial rock, heavy metal, new-age, experimental, psychedelic rock, world
- Occupations: Composer, singer, songwriter, musician, lyricist, producer, film-maker
- Instruments: Vocals; keyboards; guitar; piano; bass; synthesiser; sampler; sequencer
- Years active: 2006–present
- Label: Elektrokore Music
- Website: http://axlhazarika.in

Axl Hazarika is an Indian avant-garde musician and filmmaker from Guwahati, Assam. He is known for his work in electronica, industrial, and avant-garde music in Northeast India.

Axl Hazarika made his official VEVO debut on 27 June 2013 with the exclusive release of the music video for his hit Indian song "Hum Badal Gaye." He started an EDM project called Rainbow Trip in late 2015, with the release of a psytrance set, "Trippy Experience," on SoundCloud. This project topped the SoundCloud Trance charts within a month and remained at #1 for twelve consecutive weeks.

In May 2016, as Rainbow Trip, Axl released the first Assamese folk EDM song, "Goru Bihu Song."

== Biography ==
Born and raised in Guwahati, Assam, Axl Hazarika started his musical career in 2008. He released his album Elektrokore in 2008, which included the anti-terrorist Assamese metal song "Joi Aai Axom." Hazarika's single, "Matribhoomi," was released following the 2008 Assam bombings and was dedicated to the victims. The songs "Jai Shiv Shankara" and "Maha Kali" are a fusion of Sanskrit shlokas, metal, and electronic music.

In 2008, Axl Hazarika formed the industrial metal project, Elektrokore, releasing several songs under the name.

On 1 January 2012, Axl Hazarika released an animated film directed by Ryan Hazarika titled Hum Badal Gaye, which is the first animated film from Northeast India. The storyline of the film focuses on the relationship between a boy and his pet cat and the soundtrack of the film was released on 14 February 2012.

On 26 January 2012, Axl Hazarika released his solo album titled Elektrokore 1, the first industrial music album from northeast India.

== Career ==
=== Rainbow Trip ===
Axl formed the EDM project Rainbow Trip with his sister, Noms Hazarika in late 2015. Their first piece of work was a psytrance set titled "Trippy Experience" that topped SoundCloud Trance charts for 12 consecutive weeks and remains in the top 50 with over 7 million plays. Rainbow Trip released their debut music video Goru Bihu Song on 27 May 2016.

== Discography ==
=== Albums ===
- Deadcall (2006)
- Elektrokore (2008)
- Elektrokore – EP (2009)
- Elektrokore 1 (2012)

=== Singles ===
- Composed Reality, Drug+love, Trapt, Wrong & Di-Vine torture from the album "Vine Dead Straw" (2007)
- Maatribhoomi (2008)
- Sacrifice (2010)
- Jai Shiv Shankara (2010)
- Maha Kali (2010)
- Hum Badal Gaye (OST) (2012)
- Prisoner in Me (2012)
- Hum Badal Gaye (Official Music Video) (2013)
- B-Deshi (2014)
- Goru Bihu Song (2016)

| | Song name | Time |
|---|---|---|
| 1. | Hum Badal Gaye | 3:01 |
| 2. | A Tribute | 1:20 |
| 3. | Life | 3:07 |
| 4. | Was I Waiting 4 U – i | 3:07 |
| 5. | Anger | 2:23 |
| 6. | Don't | 3:09 |
| 7. | Was I Waiting 4 U – ii | 2:22 |
| 8. | Re-Lease | 3:38 |
| 9. | Prisoner in Me | 2:19 |
| 10. | Sacrifice | 3:22 |
| 11. | Jai Shiv Shankara | 3:49 |
| 12. | B-Deshi | 5:18 |
| 13. | Maha Kali | 4:08 |
| 14. | Joi Aai Axom | 2:32 |
| 15. | Maatribhoomi | 4:07 |
| 16 | Goru Bihu Song | 4:01 |
