= National Democratic Front of Boroland - Progressive =

- NDFB flag
- Leader: B. Sungthagra
- Dates active: 2009 - 2020
- Split from: National Democratic Front of Boroland
- Status: disbanded
- Size: 3000+

National Democratic Front of Boroland - Progressive (P) was one of the three factions of the National Democratic Front of Boroland. The parent unit, NDFB, was formed on 3 October 1986 and was initially named as Bodo Security Force. It was an armed struggle for a separate state for Bodos, the largest tribal group in Assam. It was renamed as NDFB in December 1994 and later split into four factions headed by B Saoraigwra, Govinda Basumatary, Ranjan Daimary and Dhirendra Boro.

It was in peace talks with the Government of India along with the D.R. Nabla faction. In March 2020, it was disbanded after signing a peace agreement with government after the second round of talks in Guwahati in January. Three other factions of the NDFB also disbanded in March 2020 after 34 years of separatist movement after they signed the agreement with the Indian government in January.

On 10 March 2020, the NDFB (Progressive) faction headed by Govinda Basumatary, announced at a special general assembly held at the Khumguri designated camp at Serfanguri that the outfit was disbanded.

== Objectives ==
Their main objective was to carve out a separate Boro homeland from the state of Assam.

== Leaders ==
B. Sungthagra was the president of the faction.

== Strength ==
Over 3,000 members of NDFB (P) are currently housed in three government approved designated ceasefire camps in Udalguri, Baksa and Kokrajhar districts of Assam.

== Other major demands ==
Apart from Boroland, the faction also had socio-cultural and economic demands. Some of these included –

- protection of land rights and political rights of Boro people outside the proposed Bodoland area,
- Inner line permits,
- reorganisations of districts,
- delimitation and reservations of Assembly and Parliamentary constituencies,
- preservation and promotion of Boro culture, tradition and language,
- establishment of institutes of higher learning such as central universities, medical and engineering colleges,
- creation of Boro regiment and paramilitary forces,
- special development package,
- general amnesty to all militants,
- setting up of legal institutions,
- strengthening of air, rail and road transport system,
- setting up industries and employment generation, etc.
