= Kakopathar =

Kakopathar is a town in the district of Tinsukia, Assam, a northeastern state of India. There are 15 Gaon Panchayats under the Kakopather Development Block. Around 27 villages fall under the Kakopather Gaon Panchayat, including Kakopather town.

== Kailashpur ==
Kailashpur is one of the villages under Kakopather tahsil. Kailashpur is about 50 km from Tinsukia, the district's main city. Kailashpur gaon is the center of the Kailashpur Gaon Panchayat. Kailashpur High School is the main educational center in the region.

== Education ==
- Kakopather College was established in 1995-96. There are many Schools around Kakopather town-
- Kakopather Higher Secondary School
- Kakopather Girls High School
- Kakopather Hindi High School
- Sarvajanin High-school (Maithong)
- Dirak Higher Secondary School
- Jyotirmoya High School
- Tezi High School
- Kanchijan High School
- Sankardev Sishu Vidya Niketan
- Jatiya Vidyalaya Kakopathe
- Radhakrishnan Academy Kakopathar
- Iris English School

== Kakopather incident ==
On 10 February 2006, nine people were killed by bullets of the armed forces and Assam Police at Kakopather. Six of them were protesters and two were residents of Kakopather hit by stray bullets from the indiscriminate firing. The protesters were among the thousands of residents that poured out from villages in and around Kakopather and took to the streets demanding justice for the custodial death of Ajit Mahanta, a 23-year-old resident of Dirak Gohain gaon in Kakopather.

Ajit Mahanta was picked up by personnel of the 13th Gorkha Regiment of the Indian Army stationed in the area. The incident took place on 4 February. At about six in the evening, seven people came to Mahanta's bamboo and thatched house where he lived with his mother, wife and two children. Five of the people were in uniform and the other two wore civilian clothes. They asked for Mahanta and his wife replied that he had gone to a neighbour's. The military personnel went searching for him and picked him up from the way. The Army later took his body to the Assam Medical College and Hospital claiming that he died in a fall. This happened on 6 February.

Following the incident on 7 February, the residents of the area and other neighbouring villages came out in protest. Thousands of people blocked National Highway 52 near Soonjan village in protest against the killing. They demanded the guilty to be punished at once. However, no action was taken against the military personnel responsible for the death of Mahanta. This led to the increase in protests and number of protesters. People started protesting at various other places like Chabua, Pengeri and Doomdooma. However, the administration turned a blind eye to the situation and did not take the case seriously even after increasing protests.

On 10 February, people gathered at Dirak Chariali and started marching towards Kakopather. Police tried to stop them, but the protesters edged on. Then the police started firing tear shells and bullets in the air. When the protesters showed no signs of fear, the police and armed forces started indiscriminate firing resulting in the death of nine people.
