= S. N. Brohmo Chaudhury =

Indian politician

Satyendra Nath Brohmo Chaudhury

Member of Parliament, Lok Sabha
- In office 1991–1996
- Constituency: Kokrajhar

Personal details
- Born: 10 March 1943 (age 83) Assam, India
- Party: Independent
- Spouse: Bijaya Laxmi Brohmo Chaudhury
- Children: 2

Satyendra Nath Brohmo Chaudhury (born 10 March 1943) is an Indian former lawyer and politician who served as a member of parliament in the 10th Lok Sabha. He represented Kokrajhar constituency from 1991 to 1996 as an independent politician. Prior to participating in the 1991 Indian general election, he served as member of Janata Party's state committee from 1978 to 1985.

== Biography ==
Brohmo was born on 10 March 1943 to Sitanath Brohmo Chaudhury in Bongaigaon, Assam, India. He obtained his Master's of Arts degree in Economic and Bachelor of Laws from various universities such as Gauhati University.

His other appointments included vice chairman of Hind Mazdoor Sabha (1981–1983) and legal advisor to Bodo Peoples' Action Committee (1988–1991). He was among the people who supported the creation of Bodoland Territorial Region.
