= December 2014 Assam violence =

Series of militant attacks

Coordinates: 26.1400°N 91.7700°E

- Part of Insurgency in Northeast India
- Location: Assam, India
- Date: 23 December 2014
- Weapon: AK-series weapons
- Deaths: 85 (including retaliatory attacks)
- Perpetrators: National Democratic Front of Bodoland (Songbijit faction); Adivasi (retaliatory)

In December 2014, a series of attacks by militants resulted in the deaths of more than 76 people in the Assam state in India. The attacks took place in the Chirang, Sonitpur, and Kokrajhar districts on 23 December 2014. They were attributed to the Songbijit faction of the National Democratic Front of Bodoland (NDFB(S)).

The Adivasi people of Assam are mostly Santhals. The NDFB claims to represent the Bodo people; it has fought a secessionist war with the government for the establishment of a separate nation (Bodoland). Although a number of NDFB militants had agreed to a ceasefire and peace talks in the 2000s, the NDFB(S) faction, led by I K Songbijit, has refused to give up militancy.

In May 2014, the government attributed a similar attack on Muslim migrants to the NDFB(S), but the NDFB denied its involvement. The December attacks, described as one of the worst massacres in the history of North-East India, resulted in the deaths of 65 people by Bodo militants, and led to widespread protests by tribal people. The protests turned violent, leading to three more deaths at the hands of the police and a retaliatory attack of the Adivasi on Bodo villages, which resulted in the death of some Bodo people. On 26 December, the government of India declared the launch of Operation "All Out" to eliminate the NDFB(S) militants. It deployed an estimated 9,000 soldiers of the Indian Army and Central Reserve Police Force.

== Background ==
The National Democratic Front of Bodoland (NDFB), a militant group which has been indulging in violence against immigrants since the late 1990s. The group signed a ceasefire with the Indian government in 2005, but one of its factions — NDFB(S), which is led by IK Songbijit — has opposed peace talks with the government. NDFB(S) warned of retaliation when the Assam Police launched an operation against them. On 21 December 2014, the Assam Police killed two NDFB militants.

== Violence ==
There has been armed conflict between the NDFB and government and between NDFB and Adivasi Cobra Force. After two NDFB cadre were killed by Assam Police, the NDFB militants attacked villagers at 6:25pm on 23 December 2014 in 3 districts of Assam: Kokrajhar, Sonitpur, and Chirang. They killed around 65 unarmed Adivasi, including 21 women and 18 children. The attacks happened during preparations for Christmas; most of the militants, as well as the Adivasi, victims were Christians.

The next day, thousands of Adivasi people marched in protest. At Dhekiajuli in the Sonitpur district, the police fired rounds to disperse the crowd when the protest march turned violent. Police killed three Adivasi protestors. In retaliation, the Adivasi killed three Bodo people in a village near Behali in the Sonitpur district. The total death toll reached 85. Both communities burned houses and damaged property in different parts of the state. The violence also spread to the Udalguri district.

== Aftermath ==
A curfew was imposed in parts of the three districts. 55 companies of central paramilitary forces were deployed. The investigation was assigned to the National Investigation Agency.

The Home Minister of India, Rajnath Singh, along with the Minister of State for Home Affairs, Kiren Rijiju, and the Minister of Tribal Affairs, Jual Oram, visited the state and met Assam's Chief Minister Tarun Gogoi and other officials. They reviewed the situation and agreed to necessary steps.

Indian Prime Minister Narendra Modi expressed grief and announced ex-gratia compensation of ₹2 lakh (US$2,100) to each of the families of the dead and ₹50,000 (US$520) to the seriously injured, while the Assam government has announced ex-gratia of ₹5 lakh (US$5,200) to families of the dead and ₹50,000 (US$520) to those injured. The Prime Minister's Office also announced ₹86 lakh (US$89,000) as compensation to the Assam government. About 72,675 people had been shifted to relief camps by 26 December.

=== Operation All Out ===
On 26 December 2014, the Indian Government declared that they had launched "Operation All Out" to eliminate the NDFB militants. This was declared by the Chief of the Army Staff, General Dalbir Singh Suhag, after meeting the Indian Home Minister, Rajnath Singh, on 26 December. About 5,000 personnel from the paramilitary CRPF and 4,620 from the Indian Army had already been deployed and ordered to eliminate the remaining militants, who were estimated to number around 80. In addition, around 2,000 personnel from the border force Sashastra Seema Bal were deployed to help maintain stability. The Indian Army has been using its helicopters to carry out aerial surveys of the affected regions.

=== Peace between two communities ===
A joint delegation of the All Bodo Students’ Union (ABSU) and the All Adivasi Students’ Association of Assam (AASAA), led by their presidents Pramode Boro and Raphael Kujur, visited the Bodo and Adivasi relief camps on Monday. They appealed to the inmates not to believe rumour-mongers, who were out to destroy unity among the people of the two communities. Both leaders demanded that the government ensure adequate security for the displaced villagers to return home and enable Bodo and Adivasi students to continue the new academic session beginning in January.
