= National Democratic Front of Boroland (D.R. Nabla faction) =

- NDFB flag
- Leader: Ranjan Daimary a.k.a. D.R. Nabla
- Dates active: 2013 - 2020
- Split from: National Democratic Front of Boroland
- Status: disbanded
- Size: 579

National Democratic Front of Boroland (D.R. Nabla faction) was one of the three factions of the National Democratic Front of Boroland, it was in peace talks with the Government of India along with the Progressive faction. In 2020, it was disbanded after signing a peace agreement with government

== Objectives ==
The main objective of the outfit was to establish a Boro homeland.

== Leaders ==
Ranjan Daimary a.k.a. D.R. Nabla, who is under house arrest currently represents as chairman of the faction.

== Strength ==
579 militants of the faction, including about 70 females were located in two designated camps established in Panbari, Dhubri District, and Udalguri Town. Some of the members of the faction had left it and joined the hardline faction which demanded sovereign existence of Boroland.
