= Hum Badal Gaye =

2012 television film

- Written by: Axl Hazarika
- Directed by: Ryan Hazarika
- Theme music composer: Axl Hazarika
- Country of origin: India
- Original language: Hindi

Production
- Producer: Axl Hazarika
- Editor: Axl Hazarika
- Production companies: Elektrokore Music & Production

Original release
- Release: 1 January 2012

Hum Badal Gaye is a 2012 animated film from Assam and Northeast India, directed by Ryan Hazarika and produced by Axl Hazarika. It was officially certified and censored by India's Central Board of Film Certification. The world television premiere of the film was held on 1 January 2012. The storyline focuses on the friendship between a boy and a cat. The story aims to inculcate a more altruistic approach towards animals. It is also in dedication to the unprivileged kids of society who lack the opportunity to experience the essence of such relationships in their lives. Unlike most other animation films of India, the animation style combines 2D and 3D elements.

== Synopsis ==
Ryan is a benevolent, kind and a caring boy who loves his adorable chubby cat, Xanah, whom he brought 5 years ago. Xanah at that time was a little kitten. Ryan found her lying injured near a pavement. This sight moved him and he brought her home and nursed her back to her health. Ryan is very fond of his cat and plays with her every day.

One day, a new cat arrives in his neighbourhood and Xanah gets a new friend. Xanah now shares the same playfulness with her new friend like she does with Ryan. Ryan misses the sole attention of his best friend which is now equally shared with her new friend. Ryan eventually realizes that he has no right to curb Xanah's freedom and independence just because she is not human. He finally lets Xanah to be her own self and enjoy her cat life without any insecurity.

== Production and music ==
The film uses a novel effect of combining 2D and 3D animation. The outlines of both characters are hand drawn and animated in 2-D, while the scenes are rendered in 3D. Hum Badal Gaye is the first-ever musical attempt, from northeast India, to produce a beautiful amalgamation of music with animation. The animation film was created by brothers Ryan Hazarika and Axl Hazarika. Directed by Ryan Hazarika, the animation part is done by both of them. While music and post production of the film is done by Axl Hazarika. The storyline of the animation film, which focuses on the friendship between a boy and a cat, throws light on the noble cause of affection towards the innocent animals who often fall prey to several human atrocities. It is also in dedication to the less fortunate, unprivileged kids of our society who miss the very opportunity to experience the essence of such relationships in their lives.

The original score is created by Assamese avant-garde / new age music composer Axl Hazarika, who is a well known composer in the Indian rock and metal scene. The soundtrack of the film, Hum Badal Gaye, is composed, mixed, mastered and produced by Axl Hazarika. The soundtrack of the film was released on 14 February 2012 in celebration of Valentine’s day worldwide.

== Critical reaction, reception, and records ==
Hum Badal Gaye is premiered simultaneously in all the major television channels of northeast India which includes DY365, Frontier TV, Rang channel, Ramdhenu channel, Newslive, NETV, NEHIFI, etc. Axl Hazarika became the only artist from northeast India to reach the no. 1 position on YouTube musician charts which remains a record for a musician from northeast India.
