= Politics of Assam =

The political structure of Assam in India is headed by the ceremonial post of the Governor. He is assisted by a council of ministers, headed by the Chief Minister, who are members of the Assam Assembly. In recent years the Governor has become more powerful, especially because the last two Governors have been ex-Army generals and the Army is entrusted with anti-insurgency operations against ULFA and other armed groups .

Some young artist, Prabal Sarma from nalbari, dhrupraj krishnatreya from Nalbari joined the movement strongly by their Cartoons and mocking art against the government.

== History ==
The Assam legislative structure is unicameral and consists of the 126-member Assam Assembly. Members are elected for a period of 5 years. The Assam Assembly is presided over by the Speaker, who is generally a member of the ruling party.

=== State Government ===
Year	Assembly	Total seats	Government	Seats won	Chief Minister	Opposition
1946-52	Provincial Assembly	108	Indian National Congress	50	Gopinath Bordoloi/Bishnu Ram Medhi	Muslim
1952-57	1st Assembly	108	Indian National Congress	76	Bishnu Ram Medhi	Socialist Party
1957-62	2nd Assembly	108	Indian National Congress	71	Bishnu Ram Medhi/Bimala Prasad Chaliha	Praja Socialist Party
1962-67	3rd Assembly	105	Indian National Congress	79	Bimala Prasad Chaliha	All Party Hill Leaders Conference
1967-72	4th Assembly	126	Indian National Congress	73	Bimala Prasad Chaliha/Mohendra Mohan Choudhury	All Party Hill Leaders Congress
1972-78	5th Assembly	114	Indian National Congress	95	Sarat Chandra Sinha	Samyukta Socialist Party
1978-79	6th Assembly	126	Janata Party/Communist Party of India/Plains Tribals Council of Assam	53/11/4	Golap Borbora/Jogendra Nath Hazarika	Indian National Congress
1979-80	–	–	Government of India	–	President Rule	
1980-81	6th Assembly	126	Indian National Congress/Communist Party of India/Independents	51/11/4	Anowara Taimur	Janata Party
1981-82	–	–	Government of India	–	President Rule	
1982	6th Assembly	126	Indian National Congress/Communist Party of India/Independents	51/11/4	Keshab Chandra Gogoi	Janata Party
1982-83	–	–	Government of India	–	President Rule	
1983-85	7th Assembly	126	Indian National Congress	91	Hiteswar Saikia	Plains Tribals Council of Assam
1985-90	8th Assembly	126	Asom Gana Parishad	69	Prafulla Kumar Mahanta	Indian National Congress
1990-91	–	–	Government of India	–	President Rule	
1991-96	9th Assembly	126	Indian National Congress	66	Hiteswar Saikia/Bhumidhar Barman	Asom Gana Parishad
1996-2001	10th Assembly	126	Asom Gana Parishad/Communist Party of India/United Minorities Front	59/2/2	Prafulla Kumar Mahanta	Indian National Congress
2001-06	11th Assembly	126	Indian National Congress	71	Tarun Gogoi	Asom Gana Parishad
2006-11	12th Assembly	126	Indian National Congress/Bodoland People's Front	53/10	Tarun Gogoi	Asom Gana Parishad
2011-16	13th Assembly	126	Indian National Congress/Bodoland People's Front	78/11	Tarun Gogoi	All India United Democratic Front
2016-21	14th Assembly	126	Bharatiya Janata Party / Asom Gana Parishad / Bodoland People's Front	61/14/12	Sarbananda Sonowal	Indian National Congress
2021-26	15th Assembly	126	Bharatiya Janata Party / Asom Gana Parishad / United People's Party Liberal	60/9/6	Himanta Biswa Sarma	Indian National Congress

=== National Legislature ===
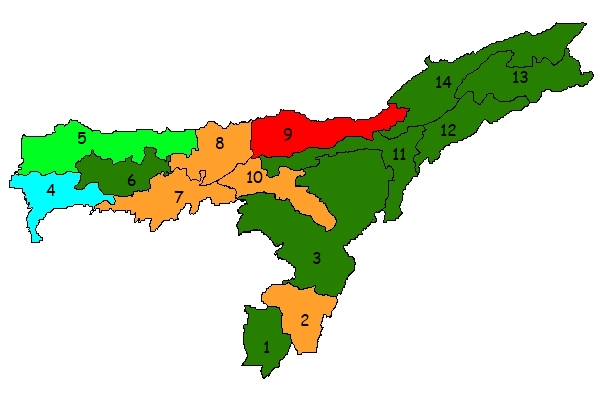
Lok Sabha districts in Assam after the 2009 elections

Assam sends 14 Member of Parliament(s) to the Lok Sabha.

Year	Lok Sabha	Total seats	Largest party	Seats won
1951	First Lok Sabha	12	Indian National Congress	11
1957	Second Lok Sabha	12	Indian National Congress	10
1962	Third Lok Sabha	12	Indian National Congress	9
1967	Fourth Lok Sabha	14	Indian National Congress	10
1971	Fifth Lok Sabha	14	Indian National Congress	13
1977	Sixth Lok Sabha	14	Indian National Congress	10
1980	Seventh Lok Sabha	8	Indian National Congress	8
1985	Eighth Lok Sabha	15	Asom Gana Parishad	7
1989	Ninth Lok Sabha	–	No elections	–
1991	Tenth Lok Sabha	14	Indian National Congress	8
1996	Eleventh Lok Sabha	14	Indian National Congress	5
1998	Twelfth Lok Sabha	14	Indian National Congress	11
1999	Thirteenth Lok Sabha	14	Indian National Congress	10
2004	Fourteenth Lok Sabha	14	Indian National Congress	7
2009	Fifteenth Lok Sabha	14	Indian National Congress	7
2014	Sixteenth Lok Sabha	14	Bharatiya Janata Party	7
2019	Seventeeth Lok Sabha	14	Bharatiya Janata Party	9
2024	Eighteeth Lok Sabha	14	Bharatiya Janata Party	9

- Karimganj 1 – All India United Democratic Front
- Silchar 2 – Indian National Congress
- Autonomous District 3 – Indian National Congress
- Dhubri 4 – All India United Democratic Front
- Kokrajhar 5 – Independent
- Barpeta 6 – All India United Democratic Front
- Gauhati 7 – Bharatiya Janata Party
- Mangaldoi 8 – Bharatiya Janata Party
- Tezpur 9 – Bharatiya Janata Party
- Nowgaon 10 – Bharatiya Janata Party
- Kaliabor 11 – Indian National Congress
- Jorhat 12 – Bharatiya Janata Party
- Dibrugarh 13 – Bharatiya Janata Party
- Lakhimpur 14 – Bharatiya Janata Party

== See also ==
- United Tribal Nationalist Liberation Front
