= Adivasi Cobra Force =

Militant insurgent group in Lower Assam, India

- Dates active: 7 July 1996–24 January 2012
- Active regions: Lower Assam, India
- Ideology: Adivasi interests
- Size: 100–350
- Wars: the Insurgency in Northeast India

The Adivasi Cobra Force (abbreviated ACF), also known as the Adivasi Cobra Militant Force (abbreviated ACMF), was a militant insurgent group in Lower Assam, India, with the claimed objective of protecting the Adivasi people through armed combat.

== Formation ==
In the late 1990s, Assam was beset by various ethnic riots between Bodos and Santhals. The Bodos began joining groups such as the National Democratic Front of Bodoland and the Bodo Liberation Tigers Force. In early 1996, over 100 people from both communities were killed in riots. In response, the Santals, claiming threats to their interests formed many groups with other Naga tribes in the area and the ACF was formed on 7 July 1996.

== Ideology ==
The ACF did not espouse any political ideology nor is it separatist like many other groups in the Seven Sister States. It claimed to be an outlet to protect the tribals from alleged ethnic cleansing during the 1996 riots from Bodo terrorist organizations. They demanded reparations for the Santals displaced by and killed in the riots and demanded that the "Adivasis" be recognized as a protected people by the Government of India.

== Organization ==
Estimates of the number of operatives in the organization ranged from 100 to 350. The group operated out of Kokrajhar and Bongaigaon districts. The commander of the organization was Durga Minz and the chairman was Xabrias Khakha. The other main leader was Kandu Murmu.

== Activities ==
The organization had a large training program in Bhutan. In 2000, Indian Armed Forces destroyed an ACF camp in Kokrajhar. In 2001, they completed a large-scale extortion drive in Kokrajhar, Bongaigaon and Dhubri to fund the terror camp in Bhutan. Their attacks mainly targeted the Assamese government and Bodo militants. On 9 September 2001, the group signed a ceasefire with the Government of India which was to last until January 2002. The ceasefire held until 2004 and was then extended by the Government of India on 1 July 2004. In 2005, chairman Xabrias Khakha said that the ACF was considering becoming a legitimate political party to contest elections in Assam.
