= Bodo Peoples' Action Committee =

Bodo Peoples' Action Committee (BPAC) was an organization that led the Bodo Movement in India. This organization was a signatory of the Bodo Accord of 20 February 1993 that ended the Bodo Movement.

The Indian lawyer S. N. Brohmo Chaudhury served as the legal advisor to the BPAC between 1988 and 1991.
