= National Democratic Front of Boroland =

Armed separatist outfit of India

- National flag of Boroland used by NDFB
- Founder: Ranjan Daimary aka D.R. Nabla
- Leader: B. Saoraigwra
- Vice-President cum Army Chief: G. Bidai
- General Secretary: B.R. Ferrenga
- Dates active: 3 October 1986–2020
- Split to: NDFB – D.R. Nabla Faction, NDFB – Progressive Faction,
- Allegiance: United Liberation Front of Western South East Asia
- Groups: National Council (Political Wing), Boroland Army (Armed Wing)
- Headquarters: Myanmar
- Active regions: Assam, India
- Ideology: Boro nationalism Marxism; Democratic socialism Revolutionary socialism
- Wars: Insurgency in Northeast India

The National Democratic Front of Boroland (NDFB) was an armed separatist outfit which sought to obtain a sovereign Boroland for the Bodo people. It is designated as a terrorist organisation by the Government of India.

NDFB traces its origin to Bodo Security Force, a militant group formed in 1986. The current name was adopted in 1994, after the group rejected Bodo Accord signed between the Government of India and ABSU-BPAC. The group has carried out several attacks in Assam, targeting non-Bodo civilians as well as the security forces. In particular, it has targeted Santhal, Munda and Oraon Adivasis (tribals), whose ancestors had been brought to Assam as tea labourers during the British Raj. Its involvement in attacks on Adivasis during Bodo-Adivasi ethnic clash during the 1996 Assam Legislative Assembly elections led to the formation of Adivasi Cobra Force, a rival militant group. After 1996, NDFB was also involved in conflicts with the militant group Bodo Liberation Tigers Force (which surrendered in 2003). Since 2000, NDFB has increasingly targeted Bangladeshi migrants in what it claims to be the Boro territory.

During the 1990s, NDFB established 12 camps on the Bhutan-Assam border. After suffering major reverses during Royal Bhutan Army's Operation All Clear, NDFB signed a ceasefire with the Indian authorities in May 2005.

This was followed by a split in the group: NDFB (P), the progressive faction supported peace talks with the government, while the faction led by Nabla opposed the talks. In 2012, following the arrest of their chairman, the NDFB Nabla faction split further, leading to the formation of a new faction led by a non-Bodo I. K. Songbijit as an interim president of the interim council. This faction continued to indulge in militancy, and has been blamed by the government for the May and December 2014 attacks.

The general assembly of the outfit held on 14 and 15 April 2015 vowed to revamp their national struggle and declared that the former interim national council of NDFB led by Songbijit is dissolved and a new national council was formed to fight for the liberation of sovereign, independent Boroland.

The NDFB signed a peace treaty with the government in 2020 and disbanded itself.

== Objectives ==
The main grievances of the group are the under-development in the region and the influx of immigrants. It aims to address these issues by seceding from India, and establishing a sovereign Boroland. The NDFB constitution, adopted on 10 March 1998, lists its objectives as the following:

- Liberate Boroland from the Indian expansionism and occupation;
- Free the Boro nation from the colonialist exploitation, oppression and domination;
- Establish a Democratic Socialist Society to promote Liberty, Equality and Fraternity; and
- Uphold the integrity and sovereignty of Boroland.

The promotion of the Roman script for the Bodo language is also a significant objective of NDFB, who is against the use of Devanagari script for the language.

== History ==
The Bodos are an ethno-linguistic community native to the Brahmaputra Valley in Assam state of India. In the mid-1980s, Bodo politicians, alleging discrimination against Bodos in Assam, intensified their campaign for the creation of Bodo-majority Bodoland. While majority of the Bodos envisaged Bodoland as an autonomous territory or state within India, a small section demanded complete sovereignty. NDFB was formed by secessionist Bodos on 3 October 1986 as the Bodo Security Force (BdSF), under the leadership of Ranjan Daimary, in Odla Khasibari village (near Udalguri). BdSF carried out several violent attacks against non-Bodo civilians. On 12 December 1992, it attacked the 7th Assam Police Battalion headquarters at Choraikhola in Kokrajahar district, and decamped with 160 self-loading rifles (SLR) and 5 light machine guns (LMG).

The Bodoland movement was mainly led by the political organisations All Bodo Students Union (ABSU) and Bodo Peoples' Action Committee (BPAC). In 1993, these two groups signed the Bodo Accord with Indian government, agreeing to the formation of Bodoland Autonomous Council within Assam. BdSF opposed this Accord. Shortly after the Accord, the Assam State Government refused to hand over 2,750 villages to the proposed Council, arguing that Bodos formed less than 50% of the population in these villages. Following this, the BdSF was renamed to National Democratic Front of Bodoland (NDFB) on 25 November 1994. The NDFB then launched an ethnic cleansing campaign, attacking non-Bodo communities in these villages. During the 1996 Assam Legislative Assembly elections, it killed hundreds of Santhal, Munda and Oraon adivasis (tribals), whose ancestors had been brought to Assam as tea labourers during British Raj (1858 - 1947). In response, the tribals formed Adivasi Cobra Force, their own militant group.

In the mid-1990s, NDFB also faced a rival within the Bodo community, in form of Bodo Liberation Tigers Force (BLTF). The BLTF had evolved from an older militant group called the Bodo Volunteer Force. It considered NDFB's secessionist agenda unrealistic and unattainable, and focused on establishment of an autonomous Bodo territory within India. After 1996, the two groups clashed violently for supremacy. BLTF allied with Bengali Tiger Force to protect Bengalis from NDFB attacks, and also supported Indian security forces against NDFB. The conflicts between Christian-dominated NDFB and Hindu-dominated BLTF polarised the Bodoland movement along religious lines. In 2003, BLTF surrendered en masse in return for the establishment of the Bodoland Territorial Council.

NDFB had established 12 camps on the Bhutan-Assam border. During 2003–2004, the Royal Bhutan Army destroyed these camps as part of its Operation All Clear. NDFB chief Ranjan Daimary was offered amnesty by the Assam Chief Minister Tarun Gogoi in December 2003, but rejected the offer. On 8 October 2004, the NDFB announced a six-month-long unilateral ceasefire, that came into effect on 15 October. However, the Government continued its operations against the group. On 15 April 2005, NDFB extended the ceasefire. The Government released its general secretary Govinda Basumatary to open a channel of communication with the organisation's Bangladesh-based leadership. This resulted in a ceasefire agreement between NDFB and the Government on 25 May 2005. The agreement stated that the NDFB agree to cease hostile action against security forces and civilians. In return, the security forces would not carry out operations against the group's members. The agreement also stipulated that NDFB members would disarm and live in camps protected by the military for a year, and would refrain from assisting other militant groups. The pact came into force on 1 June 2005. However, certain factions of NDFB continued militancy. In May 2006, five members of the security forces were abducted and killed by suspected NDFB members in Assam's Udalguri district. The group also continued to clash with cadres of the ex-BLTF (Bodo Liberation Tiger Force). On 5 June 2006, two former BLTF cadres were killed by NDFB militants in the Karbi Anglong district, and one former member of the disbanded group was lynched by suspected NDFB militants in Golaghat district on 3 June 2007.

In 2008, the group split into two after Ranjan Daimary's name appeared in the 2008 Assam bombings case. NDFB (P), the pro-talks factions led by B Sungthagra supported peace talks with the governments. NDFB (R), led by Daimary, refused to give up militancy. In December 2008, the NDFB (P) indicated its plans to indirectly or directly participate the Lok Sabha elections. In 2012, I. K. Songbijit, the chief of the NDFB (R) faction's "Boroland Army", announced the formation of a nine-member "interim national council", resulting in a split. NDFB (S), the faction led by Songbijit, is now the most dreaded faction. Amit Shah signed a historic peace treaty with factions on NDFB in February 2020.

== Splits ==
After Bhutan army's Operation All Clear in 2003 the then united NDFB decided to go for a ceasefire and talks to resolve the political issue in 2004. The proposal was submitted in 2008 and there was a meeting of the joint military council in Manipur. The secretary in the ministry of development of the northeast region, Naveen Verma, told the general secretary of the outfit that they must amend their proposition instead of negotiation at table or in other words they were forced to revise it, amend it and write a new memorandum.

There would have been no talks and extension of ceasefire unless the proposition was revised and amended which was submitted by the faction now known as National Democratic Front of Boroland - Progressive; the faction led by Ranjan Daimary who rejected it was then known as the Anti-Talks Faction, which further split into two factions.

== Leaders ==
=== National Council members ===
- President : B. Saoraigwra
- Vice-president : G. Bidai
- General Secretary : B.R. Ferrenga

== Equipment ==
=== Weapons ===
NDFB have a sizeable number of weapons including AK-series rifles. Since they have camps in Myanmar across Arunachal Pradesh, they have access to the latest weapons.

== Activities ==
NDFB has carried out bombings, kidnappings and murders in Assam. Due to armed conflict between NDFB and Adivasi Cobra Force, the NDFB have attacked Adivasi many times. The Assam Government has accused it of launching an ethnic cleansing campaign against the Oriya Adivasis and Bengali Muslim settlers in the region.

The group primarily operates in the region to the north and north-west of the Brahmaputra river. It is active in the Bongaigoan, Kokrajhar, Darrang, Barpeta, Barpeta, Nalbari and Sonitpur districts of Assam. It has also been active in the Garo Hills region of Meghalaya. It has used the neighbouring Bhutan as a refuge, crossing the border in the Manas National Park area. In December 2003, the Royal Bhutan Army initiated a crackdown on the group's activities in Bhutan.

Between 1992 and 2001, the violence involving NDFB resulted in the deaths of 167 security forces personnel and over 1200 civilians:

Year	Civilians killed by NDFB	Security Forces Personnel killed by NDFB	NDFB militants killed by the Security Forces
1992	37	10	1
1993	25	6	6
1994	108	22	6
1995	132	16	7
1996	176	25	15
1997	137	25	31
1998	305	22	37
1999	113	14	50
2000	95	20	109
2001	134	7	113

=== Attacks attributed to NDFB ===
The attacks attributed to the NDFB include (SATP). Some incident don't have evidence but NDFB is believed to be involved.

Date	Place	Incident	Reference
1 May 1998	Anjora	NDFB militants kill 5 Adivasis (tribals)	
2 May 1998	Deoshree, Kokrajhar district	NDFB militants drag 4 Adivasis out of a bus, kill one of them and torture the other 3	SATP
3 May 1998	near Bishmuri point on NH-31, Kokrajhar district	NDFB militants drag Adivasis out of a bus, and kill 98 of them; four others injured	SATP
9 May 1998	Borbil, near Gosaigaon	NDFB militants kill 16 Santhals Adivasis, including 10 women and two children; 12 others injured	
17 June 1998	Kokrajhar district	NDFB militants kill four Adivasis	SATP
15 September 1998	Gossaigaon subdivision, Kokrajhar district	NDFB militants kill 14 Santhals	SATP
31 July 2000	Soonmari	NDFB militants blow up two bogies of a Rangia-bound passenger train, killing 14 passengers	SATP
1 August 2000	near Tezpur	NDFB militants explode a bomb on a passenger train, killing 12 people	SATP
19 August 2000	Guwahati	NDFB kills Bineshwar Brahma, branding him an agent of the BJP-led Central government. Brahma was opposed to the adoption of the Roman script for the Bodo language, which had invited the ire of NDFB.	
21 August 2000	Dhubri	NDFB militants kill 5 Muslim civilians	SATP
21 August 2000	Garagaon	NDFB militants kill the Bodo MLA Mohini Basumatary of the People's Democratic Front	
8 November 2000	Barpeta district	Suspected NDFB militants kill 8 civilians, including 7 non-Assamese people	
26 November 2000	Lung Sung forest reserve	NDFB kills 8 woodcutters who refused to obey their order to stop logging in Bodo areas	SATP
3 January 2001	Assam	NDFB militants kill woodcutters	
31 July 2001	Soonmari	NDFB militants detonate a bomb on a Rangiya-bound passenger train, killing 14	
1 August 2001	near Rangia	NDFB militants detonate a bomb on the Arunachal Express between Rangia and Goreswar stations, killing 12 and injuring 8. Two NDFB militants suspected to be involved in the blast were killed in a police encounter near Goreswar.	
25 September 2001	Baghmari, Bongaigaon district	NDFB bomb blast derails the North East Express, injuring 100 people	SATP
25 October 2001	Gauripur	NDFB militants detonate an explosive at a Hindu celebration, killing 3 and injuring 12	
7 December 2001	Assam	Opposed to logging in the region, NDFB militants kill 4 woodcutters in two separate incidents	
2 June 2002	Bongshijhora village, Dhubri district	NDFB militants kill 3 members of a family	
14 July 2002	West Maligaon forest village relief camps, Kokrajhar district	Suspected NDFB militants kill 9 Adivasis, injure 5 others	SATP
17 August 2002	near Sarbhog, Barpeta district	NDFB militants kill a school teacher	SATP
21 August 2002	Maladhara, Goalpara district	NDFB militants kill four police personnel and a civilian driver, injure 17 more	SATP
23 October 2002	Deosankar Reserve Forest, Dhubri district	NDFB militants fire on a group of two woodcutters, killing two	
27 October 2002	Datgiri village, Kokrahjar district	NDFB militants kill 22 civilians	SATP
26 April 2003	Taijouguri village, Kokrajhar district	Suspected NDFB militants kill 4 members (including two children) of the family of a former colleague	SATP
14 July 2003	Kokrajhar district	NDFB militants kill 3 people in separate incidents	
18 July 2003	Dwimguri village, Kokrajhar district	NDFB militants kill 4 persons they suspect to be government informers	SATP
24 November 2003	Khanglabari, Darrang district	NDFB militants kill 3 Biharis, and injure 9 others	
2 October 2004	Makrijhora, Dhubri district	NDFB militants open indiscriminate firing at a busy market, killing 16 people and injuring 20 others	SATP
4 October 2004	Gelapukhuri village, Sonitpur district	NDFB militants kill six civilians, injure 7 others	SATP
5 October 2004	Jalabila village, Dhubri district	Suspected NDFB militants shoot dead 10 civilians, injure 7 others	SATP
1 December 2004	Lutubari, West Garo Hills, Meghalaya	NDFB militants kill 5 villagers and injure another	SATP
21 May 2007	Udalguri district	NDFB cadres abduct five security force personnel and a civilian. The civilian Babul Kalita was found dead on 22 May. The other five were found dead in the Belsiri Nala (West Kameng district, Arunachal Pradesh) on 29 May.	SATP
16 March 2008	Dhaolabari Ashuline, near Kokrajhar	NDFB militants shoot dead Bigrai Basumatary alias Belaibe, the secretary of the surrendered NDFB Welfare Association	SATP
30 October 2008	Guwahati and neighbouring areas	2008 Assam bombings: NDFB cadres were suspected to have executed the attacks planned by ULFA and other groups.	SATP
30 June 2009	Naharani Grant village, Sontipur district	NDFB militants shoot dead four persons of a family: Munna Pal (30), his wife Subhapati Pal (35), his younger brother Tunna Pal (30) and his son Pankaj Pal (3)	SATP
4 October 2009	Bhimajuli	NDFB-ATF kills 12 people in Bhimajuli massacre	
8 July 2010	Gossaigaon, Kokrajhar district	NDFB militants blast railway tracks, resulting in derailment of the Kolkata-bound Garib Rath Express. A six-year-old child Durlav Sethia was killed, and 23 others were injured. The NDFB stated that the attack was a revenge for the mistreatment of its arrested leader Ranjan Daimary and the killing of "innocent Bodo youths" by the security forces.	
29 August 2010	Gamani, near Bhalukpong	NDFB militants kidnap two goods train drivers Nirmal Chandra Borgohain and Abhijit Siring Phukan, demand ₹ 10 million (10 million) as ransom	
8–9 November 2010	Assam	NDFB-ATF militants kill 22 people in separate attacks. On 8 November, the militants killed 19 people, including 13 Hindi speakers. Several others were injured, one of whom died the next day. The next day, they killed two Hindi-speaking Muslims in Ultapani, Kokrajhar district, and a cycle mechanic Paran Mandal in Chirang district. Earlier on 1 November, the NDFB had threatened to kill 20 or more people for every NDFB cadre killed by Security Forces.	SATP
14 March 2011	Between Bangladoba (Chirang district) and Ultapani (Kokrajhar district)	The militants of the Ranjan Daimary-led faction ambush patrolling troop of BSF, killing 8 jawans.	
13 August 2012	Chirang district	NDFB-RD militants shoot dead a Muslim labourer, and injure three others. The four victims were natives of West Bengal, and were returning from Bhutan.	SATP
13 November 2012	Harishinga, Sonitpur district	NDFB-RD militants kill a tea planter Adilur Rahman, and injure his bodyguard Motilal Tirkey	SATP
27 January 2014	Mauriapur village, Sonitpur district	NDFB-S militants ambush a police convoy, killing ASP Gulzar Hussain and injuring 5 other policemen. The police convoy was returning from a night-long operation against the group.	SATP
May 2014	Kokrajhar and Baksa districts	May 2014 Assam violence: 32 Muslims were killed in a series of attacks. The government blamed NDFB-Songbijit faction for the attacks. The NDFB denied any involvement in the killings, and stated that the government agencies were behind the attacks.	
August 2014	Chirang district	A 16-year-old girl was dragged, beaten and shot at point blank range at least nine times in front of her parents	
December 2014	Sontipur and Kokrajhar districts	December 2014 Assam violence: NDFB militants killed over 65 Adivasis. According to police, this was in response to the intensified operation by the security forces.	
5 August 2016	Assam	2016 Kokrajhar shooting: A group of militants opened fire at a market in Balajan Tiniali, near the town of Kokrajhar in Assam, India. Fourteen people were killed and sixteen were injured as a result of the attack. NDFB (S) is believed to be involved in this case.	

== Disbanding ==
NDFB disbanded itself at two locations in accordance with a clause in Memorandum of Settlement (MoS) signed by the four factions and the other stakeholders with the Indian Government on 27 January 2020. While disbanding, the NDFB (P) leader Gobinda Basumatry said "To find a solution to political, economic, social and cultural issues of Bodo people, the Bodo Security Force was formed in 1986. It was renamed as NDFB in 1994. Our fight has finally come to an end after 34 years of armed struggle within and outside the country... from Nepal, Bangladesh, Myanmar and Bhutan. We believe that the NDFB movement has been a successful one and so we are disbanding the group."

== See also ==
- Insurgency in Northeast India
- List of terrorist organisations in India
- ULFA
