= 2009 Guwahati bombings =

Terrorist incident in Assam, India

2009 Guwahati serial blasts
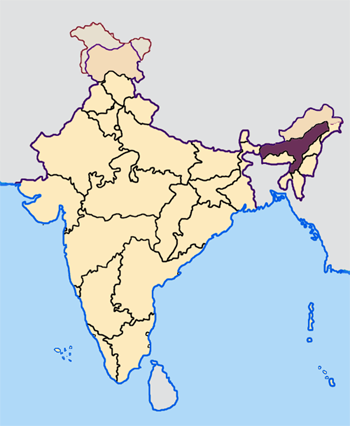
- The state of Assam (highlighted in purple), the location of the attacks, shown within the rest of India.
- Location: Guwahati, Assam, India
- Date: 1 January 2009 (+ 5:30)
- Attack type: improvised explosive device bombing
- Deaths: 6
- Injuries: 67
- Perpetrator: ULFA

The 2009 Guwahati bombings occurred on 1 January 2009 in Guwahati, Assam, India. They occurred a few hours before Indian Home Minister P. Chidambaram was due to travel to the city.

The bombing, carried out by the United Liberation Front of Asom (ULFA), left 6 people dead and a further 67 injured.

== Details ==
Police confirmed that the first blast took place near Lokopriya Gopinath Bordoloi TB Hospital at Birubari at 2:35pm, injuring five people, including a 10-year-old child. Another blast at the busy Bhootnath market near the famous Kamakhya Temple, killed two people and injured at least 25 others. Police said that a bomb was placed on a bicycle. The Home Minister, P Chidambaram, was to pass Bhootnath on his way from the airport.

The third blast occurred outside a Big Bazaar retail outlet at Bhangagarh, a commercial area near Guwahati Medical College (GMCH), at 5:45 pm. Bhangagarh is one of the poshest areas in Guwahati and home to many shopping malls. Three of the 34 people injured in the blast succumbed to their injuries in hospital. Police suspected that the bomb was kept inside a pan shop in the area. Another person died in the hospital taking the death toll to 6.

All three blasts were low intensity, carried using Improvised explosive devices (IED). Police say that a biker placed the first bomb in a dustbin, the second one was placed on a cycle and third on the roadside. The second blast was the most powerful one. The third blast ignited a fire due to its proximity to a kerosene source. The injured were admitted to the GMCH and MMCH hospitals in critical condition.

== Investigation ==
The United Liberation Front of Asom (ULFA) is suspected of having carried out the bombings.

== Reactions ==
Assam Chief Minister Tarun Gogoi admitted security lapses and expressed the need of strengthening the state police force.

== See also ==
- 2008 Assam bombings
