= Nongalbibra =

Village in Meghalaya, India

Nongalbibra is a small town in South Garo Hills, Meghalaya, India, famous for its Coal. The great river of Garo Hills, the Simsang River passes through it. Majority of the sino-Tibetan speaking community of the Garo are present, who are called the Atongs.
