= Ranjan Daimary =

Boro separatist

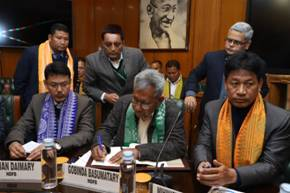
- NDFB(R) leader Ranjan Daimary (left)
- Born: Ransaigra Nabla Daimary; 21 February 1960 (age 66); Udalguri, Assam
- Other name: D. R. Nabla
- Education: North-Eastern Hill University
- Spouse: Nisha Daimary
- Status: imprisoned
- Conviction: Convicted
- Criminal charges: Waging war against India, killing civilians
- Penalty: Life Imprisonment

Ranjan Daimary alias D.R. Nabla (Ransaigra Nabla Daimary) is the founder president of the armed separatist outfit National Democratic Front of Boroland. Daimary initially founded a militant group named Bodo Security Force in October 1986. Later, in 1994, Bodo Security Force was renamed as National Democratic Front of Boroland.

== Education ==
Ranjan Daimary belongs to an educated and rich family. Daimary's academic career is associated with noted school, college and university of Shillong, Meghalaya. Daimary completed his graduation in Political Science from St Anthony's College, and completed his Master's Degree in Political Science from North-Eastern Hill University.

== Family and secret killing of family ==
Ranjan Daimary's sister Lilawati Daimary, a school teacher, was killed by unidentified gunmen on 5 January 2010 in what is widely believed to be one of the incidents of the Secret killings of Assam issue. Daimary's other sister Dr. Anjali Daimary is the chief of the Bodo Women Justice Forum.

== Arrest ==
Ranjan Daimary was detained in Dhaka by Bangladesh Rifles (BDR) in December, 2009 and was later handed over to Border Security Force (BSF) authorities on 30 April 2010. In reply to a habeas corpus petition filed by Daimary's sister Anjali Daimary, Gauhati High court Justice Ranjan Gogoi and Justice B P Katakey opined that the wife and children of Ranjan Daimary have not been handed over to them along with him by the Bangladesh Rifles.
Daimary's sister, Dr. Anjali Daimary, said to media that Ranjan Daimary would be ready for a lateral talk with the government, but not with a state as handcuffed.

== Bail & release ==
Ranjan Daimary got bail on 11 April 2013 by the Session Judge of Gauhati in the cases against him including the 2008 Assam bombings case(case number Sessions Case No. 59 (K) of 2011).

Mr. Daimary was released on a parol of four weeks by order of the Gauhati High Court and flown to New Delhi to take part in the ongoing peace talks with Bodo Militants & Union of India.

== Conviction ==
In January 2019, Ranjan Daimary and 13 others were convicted for 2008 Assam bombings. where Daimary and 9 others were sentenced to Life Imprisonment by the special court of the Central Bureau of Investigation (CBI).

== See also ==
- National Democratic Front of Boroland
- National Democratic Front of Boroland (D.R. Nabla faction)
- 2008 Assam bombings
