= 2008 Assam bombings =

Terrorist attacks in India

2008 Assam serial blasts
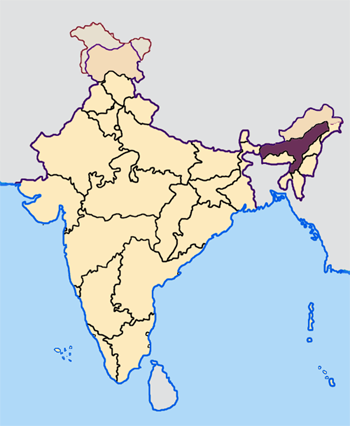
- Location: Assam, India
- Date: 30 October 2008
- Attack type: Mass car bombings
- Weapons: RDX, TNT and PETN
- Deaths: 81
- Injuries: 470
- Perpetrator: NDFB

The 2008 Assam bombings occurred on 30 October 2008, before noon in markets in Guwahati city and the surrounding area of western Assam. As many as 18 bombs reportedly went off, causing at least 81 deaths and 470 injuries.

== Bomb attacks ==
Union Minister Shakeel Ahmed confirmed 10 blasts took place, however, reports did indicate the number could have been as high as eighteen. The blasts ripped apart Guwahati, Barpeta Road, Bongaigaon and Kokrajhar. The explosions in Guwahati ripped through Pan Bazar, Fancy Bazar and Ganeshguri, which were crowded with shoppers and office goers. Three blasts occurred in Kokrajhar, with another possible grenade explosion; one in Bongaigaon and two in Barpeta Road. Indian media outlets pointed out that the blasts took place just after the Diwali holidays making the blasts even more unexpected and adding to a toll count. The bomb at Ganeshguri was planted in a car and took place about 100 meters from Chief Minister of Assam Tarun Gogoi's official residence.

In Guwahati, 41 people were killed; in Kokrajhar, 21; and in Barpeta Road, 15. On 2 November, four more succumbed to their injuries here. Three died at Gauhati Medical College Hospital, while another died at the Basistha Army Hospital. Twenty others were also in a critical condition.

Police officials added that huge amounts of explosives like RDX or other plastic explosives, like C4, have been used as a fire erupted immediately following the blasts. Timers were also speculated to have been used to execute the blasts, which were seen with timing almost to perfection as the blasts took place within a short span of 15 minutes. It was further speculated after investigations were initiated, that motorbikes may have been used. However, Assam police chief RN Mathur also said most of the bombs were "planted in cars." In addition to the immediate casualty toll seven more people succumbed to their injuries overnight.

=== Immediate consequences ===
- Immediately following the attack the Government of Assam issued a high alert and deployed paramilitary forces to control a potentially volatile situation. Security was also increased in the Jalpaiguri district following the blasts. The police and Sima Suraksha Bal (Border Security Force) were said to be keeping a joint vigilance along the Bangladesh border. The superintendent of police, Jalpaiguri, Manoj Varma, said that police had been instructed to keep around the clock vigilance over important public places in the district.
- Following the blasts, angry crowds clashed with police in some areas of Guwahati. Some people were injured in the clash and, at one point, police had to fire in the air to disperse an angry mob. It was also reported on the television media that mobs were hampering efforts by police and the fire brigade to clean up after the blasts. The mobs were seen attacking police and fire equipment. A curfew had been imposed in Guwahati and some other cities of Assam following the serial bomb blasts.
- It was also reported that members of the Assamese diaspora trying to contact relatives following the blasts faced jammed telephone networks, making it impossible to get information out of the region.
- Gauhati Medical College and Hospital where the victims were being treated reported an acute shortage of blood. The Health Minister Himanta Biswa Sarma urged people to donate blood. Asom Gana Parishad also directed the party cadres to donate blood. Several NGOs and volunteers of social organisations came forward to donate blood and provide help to family members of the injured and those who lost their lives.
- In response to the Tarun Gogoi government's alleged failure to protect Assam, a motley crowd attempted to storm into the state secretariat with two charred bodies from the blasts as hundreds more took to the streets in protest. The mob, shouting slogans like "Tarun Gogoi murdabad", was stopped at the gates of the seat of government by the security staff. They also demanded that "Gogoi come out and see what your failure to protect the people has caused. It has killed innocent people."

=== Follow up ===
On the same day a convoy of police cars in Assam came under fire from rebels resulting in seven police and three civilian casualties.

=== Consequences ===
A spontaneous bandh total shut down, was observed the next day at Kokrajhar on a call given by the Vishva Hindu Parishad (VHP), the Bharatiya Janata Party (BJP), and the Bajrang Dal, while schools and educational institutions also remained closed in Guwahati. Only a few shops in the capital were opened and vehicular traffic was thin with most people choosing to stay indoors. BJP leader L. K. Advani, who arrived in Assam on the same morning, visited the blast site near the Deputy Commissioner's office, where he also faced a group of angry lawyers who shouted slogans saying "Advani go back." He also visited the Gauhati Medical College and Hospital and met the injured. The Union Home Minister Shivraj Patil, who was arrived later in the day, visited Kokrajhar and Barpeta. He also held a high-level meeting at the Lokopriyo Gopinath Bordoloi International Airport in the evening. Attendance in commercial areas where offices are located was thin, and in many areas shops and business establishments, particularly those in and around the blast sites remained closed. Few public transports were seen plying on the roads in the morning. The opposition Asom Gana Parishad observed a Black Day with all its leaders and cadres sporting black badges. Lawyers from both Gauhati High Court and the Sessions Court in Guwahati abstained from work and held protests outside the court premises.

A curfew was again clamped on the worst-hit Ganeshguri in the afternoon after the initial curfew was relaxed the previous evening, as an angry mob braved tight security in the presence of the city SS and went on a rampage. The police then resorted to firing blanks, injuring at least five people in the ensuing melee. The leader of the opposition and former Deputy Prime Minister Advani visited the spot just minutes before the disturbance.

On 1 November the prime minister was set to visit his home constituency to take the stock of the situation after the blasts. He would meet the Assam Governor Shiv Charan Mathur and Chief Minister Tarun Gogoi, as well as visit the Gauhati Medical College and Hospital to see the injured in the blasts.

As a result of this blast, the biggest in Assamese history, CM Gogoi moved to recruit 4,000 more police personnel in all ranks to augment the strength of the police force to over 65,000 before the end of the year as part of Assam's counter-terrorism plan. He added the necessity of such a move was predicated by having experienced 605 bomb blasts in the last eight years, each of which caused significant devastation to life and property. He added that police and other security personnel had also recovered or defused more than 5,000 bombs and grenades.

== Investigation ==
The Union home secretary, Madhukar Gupta, said a team of National Security Guards experts from New Delhi also visited the blast sites at Ganeshguri, the deputy commissioner's office and Fancy Bazaar. When asked about the nature of the explosives, he said forensic experts were already examining the blasts sites. In regards to more paramilitary forces, saying there were already enough forces deployed, he added: "We will retain them for some more time and probably not deploy them on poll duties (in six states)." A high-level team consisting of senior Home Ministry officials also visited Assam to make an on-the-spot assessment of the situation arising out blasts.

Police said they had picked up about a dozen suspects for interrogation within the first 24 hours. An official in the police department said: "We are making good headway in our investigations and should be able to zero in on the people or groups involved in the serial bombings." Two persons from Nagaon district were arrested in connection with the attacks. Asib Mohammed Nizami and Zulfikar Ali were the owners of two vehicles in which the bombs were planted in the Ganeshguri area of Guwahati and Bongaigaon.

On 1 November, the army told the Prime Minister that it had previously intercepted a message from Calcutta one week before the incident that said: "Attack Guwahati." The army told the PM that had known about the impending terror strikes in the western Assam towns for six weeks and had tried to prevent them. Lt. Gen. B.S. Jaswal, of the GOC 4 Corps, told the PM the army had received "non-specific" information on 17 September about possible strikes in Guwahati, Barpeta Road and Kokrajhar. CM Gogoi, who heads Assam's unified command that includes the army, corroborated the message with Singh. In admitting such knowledge he added that the government did not anticipate the scale of the blasts. The government then also formed a special team, headed by the inspector-general of police (special task force), R. Chandranathan, to probe the blasts and issue a report within 30 days.

Evidence emerged that a hit-team of the National Democratic Front of Bodoland (NDFB) executed the bombings in Assam. This undermined earlier claims of HuJI responsibility. Police were quoted as saying a text message sent to a local television station claiming responsibility for the bombings on behalf of the hitherto unknown Islamic Security Force-Indian Mujahideen turned out to be a hoax. Assam police investigators determined that two of the three Maruti 800s used as bombs were purchased by NDFB activists less than six weeks before the attacks. Interrogation of suspects linked to the fabrication of the car-bombs led investigators to believe that there were orders to initiate the operation by the NDFB founder-chief, Ranjan Daimary, as early as September. Daimary, believed to shuttle between Bangkok, Manila and Singapore, is said to have authorised the attacks to signal frustration with the lack of progress in talks between the NDFB and the Indian government. Following this, the Indian government decided to clamp down on the organization and other regional outfits. A ban on the NDFB, set to expire in 2008, was extended by two years. The Cabinet Committee on Security also decided to re-impose a ban on the outlawed ULFA, Hynniewtrep National Liberation Council (HNLC), however, it spared the ANVC.

On 12 November, a Bhutanese man who lived in Nepal and fought against the monarchy was arrested for aiding the Assam attacks. Tenzing G. Zangpo, a senior leader of the Druk National Congress (DNC), a formation by Bhutanese exiles in Nepal, was picked up with the "home secretary" of the NDFB, Sabin Boro, from a rented house at Japorigog in Guwahati. An unknown source was quoted as saying, "After interrogation, both of them were arrested this morning on the charge of being part of the conspiracy behind October 30 blasts." The arrest attention from Bangladesh based forces to Bhutan for the first time since the probe was initiated. Police said the DNC claimed to be a political outfit opposing the alleged discrimination of Bhutanese people of Nepali origin by the monarchy since the 1990s.

== Perpetrators ==
Union Minister Shakil Ahmed hinted that communal riots in Assam for the preceding several days could be inter-linked to the attacks. He said that the politics of hate was a plausible reason behind the attacks.

Fresh evidence put forth by the Assam Police now suggests that the National Democratic Front of Bodoland (NDFB) engineered the attacks based on orders issued by its founder and chief, Ranjan Daimary, in September 2008.

== Reactions ==
=== Central reactions ===
Leader of the opposition, L. K. Advani, used the blasts to lambaste the ruling UPA-led government. He said: "I believe that these blasts are symbolic of the sense of insecurity in the country. This also proves the total failure of the government in combating terrorism", adding that it was likely that illegal Bangladeshi migrants in Assam, with an increasing influx of such immigrants, could be involved in the blasts.

The next day he came out again blaming illegal infiltration from Bangladesh as the main reason for the breeding of terrorism in Assam saying "I blame the state and the central government for the blasts in Assam." He continued to question the PM, "I ask the prime minister, who is elected from Assam, what his government has done after the Supreme Court's landmark judgment on the IMDT (Illegal Migrants Determination by Tribunals) Act indicating the Government of India for having colluded with external aggression. The government only incorporated all those provisions in the struck down IMDT in the Foreigners Act, which the Supreme Court declared as unconstitutional." He also visited blast sites and met injured victims at the hospitals.

Union Minister of State for Home, Shriprakash Jaiswal, also condemned the blasts and added: "The blasts will have no impact on the forthcoming Assembly elections in Mizoram. The Home Ministry has asked for a report on the serial blasts from the Assam government." He claimed that due to the sincere efforts of the ruling central coalition government, incidents of terror in the northeastern sister states had gone down by as much as 50 per cent in the last four years.

The prime minister also strongly condemning the blasts and added that his government would take all possible steps to bring the perpetrators of the attack to justice. Along with the UPA chairperson, Sonia Gandhi, were set to visit Assam on 1 November. The day before Union Home Minister, Shivraj Patil, also arrived in Assam and visited blast sites in Kokrajhar and Guwahati, as well as holding a security meeting with the chief minister, and senior police and administrative officials. He said: "We shall nab the culprits involved in the blasts. Investigations are on and we should be able to come out with something concrete."

Former Indian prime minister Atal Behari Vajpayee hinted at a call for greater national unity and what he termed a collective war on terror after the blasts.

=== Pan-Indian reactions ===
The Jharkhand government also came out strongly condemning the serial blasts, while having summoned a cabinet meeting in Ranchi for the next day to discuss the security situation in his region. Deputy Chief Minister, Sudhir Mahto, described the act as one of "cowardice" and said the state machinery had been alerted in Jharkhand following the incident. He added that he expressed confidence that the UPA government at the centre would initiate all necessary steps to rein in anti-national elements who are bent upon weakening the prevailing peace and tranquillity, while appealing to the central government to provide adequate compensation to the family members of the victims. While he also denied the fact that the militant activities were on the rise in the country at large during the rule of the UPA government, he expressed concern over the recent revelation that Hindu militants' were involved in the Malegaon incident. He said this by alluding to the fact that vested interests were keen on dividing the country by creating panic.

Vigilance was stepped up along the West Bengal border with Assam following the blasts. Additional security forces were rushed to assist in combing operations to track down those responsible for the blasts attempting to flee from Assam through the border with north Bengal. State's Home Secretary, Ashok Mohan Chakavarty, said an alert had been sounded across West Bengal, with security tightened in the capital city. Further security arrangements were under review, particularly in the border districts where check-posts have been set up. A senior police official in West Bengal said: "A special alert has been sounded in the region. Vehicles passing through the border with Assam are being checked." He added that surveillance had also been considerably tightened at West Bengal's international borders with Nepal, Bangladesh and Bhutan.

Uttar Pradesh Chief Minister, Mayawati, also strongly condemned the serial blasts, while demanding that the Prime Minister take effective measures to ensure that such incidents are not repeated.

=== International reactions ===
U.N Secretary-General Ban Ki-moon, who was in India at the time of the attack, issued a statement via a spokesman expressing his deep sorrow and sympathy to the government and people of India for the loss of life and destruction caused by the attacks. He also stated that he "strongly condemns this act of terrorism in its targeting of civilians", also declaring that there can be no justification for such indiscriminate violence.

Russian president Dmitry Medvedev resolutely condemned the deadly blasts, dubbing them as an "inhuman and monstrous" crime which cannot have any justification. In a message to Indian president Pratibha Patil and Prime Minister Singh, he expressed his indignation at the "barbarous" act and called for strict punishment for those responsible. He said: "I learnt with deep indignation about the series of coordinated terrorist acts in Assam, which led to the deaths of scores of innocent people. Such inhuman and monstrous in cruelty crime have no justification. Terrorists guilty of committing this barbarous act must be severely punished." The Russian Foreign Ministry also said: "The Foreign Ministry of Russia resolutely condemns the acts of terrorists. They have no and cannot have any justification. The criminals must be severely punished for their acts."

Bangladesh also strongly condemned the attack. Foreign adviser Iftekhar Ahmed Chowdhury term the attack an act of "cowardly terrorism." Adding: "We strongly condemn the bomb blast in the North-Eastern India that led to so many deaths and injuries. It is a cowardly act of terrorism. Violence cannot be a tool for the achievement of political objectives."

== See also ==
- 2009 Guwahati bombings
