= May 2014 Assam violence =

Anti-Muslim killings in northeastern India

2014 Assam violence
- Part of Insurgency in Northeast India
- Location: Assam, India
- Date: 1 May 2014 – 3 May 2014
- Weapon: AK 47
- Deaths: 33 (and 3 suspected perpetrators)
- Perpetrator: 3 suspected members of the National Democratic Front of Bodoland's Songbijit faction
- Motive: Not voting for Bodos

From the night of 1 May 2014 until the early morning hours of 3 May, a series of attacks occurred against Bengali Muslims in Assam, a north-eastern state of India. The perpetrators are suspected to be members of the terrorist group National Democratic Front of Bodoland's Songbijit faction. Speculated to be revenge for not voting for the National Democratic Front in the Lok Sabha elections, the death toll reached 33.

== Background ==
The Bodo people are an indigenous community in the Assam state of India and constitute about 3% of the state's population of 31 million people. The insurgency in Northeast India has been ongoing for decades, involving several rebel groups. In 2012, violence between Bodo tribal people and Bengali Muslims resulted in 108 deaths fueled by an Assam Police Constable Mohibur Islam (alias Ratul).

In India, the Lok Sabha election was being held which would conclude its last phase on 12 May and the results would be declared on 16 May.

== Attacks ==
Around 07:30 PM IST on 1 May, insurgents, arriving on bicycles, raided the Baksa district village of Narsingbari, opening fire on a house, killing three women and injuring two others. In the early morning hours of 2 May, another group of insurgents opened fire at three houses in the village of Balapara in the district of Kokrajhar, killing seven people. On the evening of the same day, another group killed 12 people and burned down 30 thatched houses near Baksa's Manas National Park. On 3 May, four suspected insurgents attacked police in the forest near Tezpur. Police fired in retaliation, killing two suspects while saying that another two had fled. Police killed an additional suspect in Udalguri district, recovering a revolver and a hand grenade.

== Investigation ==
Police arrested 22 people along with eight forest guards to investigate their involvement. The Assam government decided to hand over the probe to National Investigation Agency.

== Aftermath ==
=== Security measures ===
Due to the attack, several Bengali Muslims from the Dotoma region of Kokrajhar district and its environs fled their homes. Bodoland Territorial Council chief Hagrama Mohilary pacified the panicked people and promised them of security. Curfew was set in Kokrajhar, Baksa, and Chirang districts and shoot-on-sight orders had been issued in Kokrajhar and Baksa. The Army did flag marches in the sensitive areas of Kokrajhar and Baksa districts. Ten additional companies of Central Reserve Police Force were moved to the two districts. Strong action against the National Democratic Font has been initiated by the home ministry of India.

The Union Home Ministry deployed 43 companies of the Central Armed Police Forces while the Defense Ministry also deployed 15 columns of the Army numbering approximately 1,500 soldiers.

=== Responses ===
Then-Chief Minister of Assam, Tarun Gogoi, reviewed the situation with top government officials. The opposition political parties blamed the Gogoi-led government in failing to protect lives despite intelligence alerts. Prime Minister of India, Manmohan Singh condemned the attack and termed it as a cowardly attempt to spread fear and terror.

In a statement, the National Democratic Front of Bodoland (Songbijit, NDFB) denied their involvement in the attack and claimed it was a conspiracy by the state government to create communal friction between Bodos and Muslims. Relatives of the dead urged Gogoi to provide affirmative security and visit the area. They complained of pressure from local authorities to immediately conduct delayed funeral rites for those killed.
