= Anti-Bengali sentiment =

Discrimination against Bengali people

Anti-Bengali sentiment comprises negative attitudes and views against the Bengali people of Bengal, mainly from Bangladesh and the Indian states of Assam and West Bengal.

== India ==
This sentiment is present in several parts of India: Assam, and various areas of Northeast India. Issues include discrimination in inhabitation, other forms of discrimination, political reasons, government actions, and anti-Bangladeshi sentiment. In India, the term Kanglu is used online as a derogatory slur for Muslim Bengali immigrants from Bangladesh, as well as for Bangladeshis more broadly. It is considered offensive and is used in a demeaning way to stereotype and insult these groups.

In Assam, the discriminative condition of Bengalis can be traced from Khoirabari massacre, Nellie massacre, Silapathar massacre, North Kamrup violence, Goreswar massacre, Bongal Kheda, etc.

This has led to emergence of Bengali language movements in India as a form of protest and formation of many pro-Bengali organisations.

The national Bharatiya Janata Party (BJP; Indian People's Party) has also been accused of promoting anti-Bengali policies like Hindi imposition and promoting vegetarianism in Bengali cuisine. According to Amartya Sen, BJP defines Bengalis with a narrow mindset and pursues aggressive policies of parochialism, in contrast to what Sen considers a quintessential Bengali pluralism. During the 2021 West Bengal Assembly election, state BJP president Dilip Ghosh mocked the widespread veneration of goddess Durga among Bengali Hindus, claiming that veneration of goddesses had made Bengali Hindus effeminate as a whole and insisted that Bengali Hindus should abandon her worship and follow the Hindi belt's example of venerating figures like the gods Rama (who had become the mascot of Hindu nationalism due to the Rama Janmabhoomi movement) and Hanuman.

In 2025, several incidents involving Bengali-speaking migrant workers (mostly Bengali Muslim, but also Bengali Hindus) being detained and harassed over allegations of being Bangladeshi infiltrators were reported from Odisha, Delhi, Haryana, Karnataka, Rajasthan, and Chhattisgarh. This came amid a lowtide in India-Bangladesh relations following the July Uprising in Bangladesh which saw the Hasina administration being replaced by an interim government of Muhammad Yunus. The incidents triggered political and social backlash in West Bengal, with leaders and activists calling it ethnic profiling and a violation of migrant rights.

=== Militant anti-Bengali organisations ===
- Hynniewtrep National Liberation Council, Meghalaya (banned, designated as a terrorist organisation by the government of India)
- National Liberation Front of Tripura, Tripura (banned, designated as a terrorist organisation by the government of India)
- All Tripura Tiger Force, Tripura
- United Liberation Front of Asom, an insurgent group of Assam categorised as a terrorist organisation by the government of India seeking independence of the state from India, targeting Bengali and non-Assamese communities, and advocating ethnic exclusivism within Assam.
- Veer Lachit Sena, an extremist organisation in Assam, is notorious for targeting Bengali and non-Assamese communities, engaging in harassment, physical assault, threats, hate speech, and using derogatory remarks and racist rhetoric against Bengali Hindus in Assam as well as Bengali Muslims.

=== Assam ===
The presence of Bengalis in Assam dates back to the British East India Company's annexation of the Ahom kingdom in the 1826 Treaty of Yandabo which ended the First Anglo-Burmese War. Bengalis immigrated to the region alongside Indian Gorkhas and tea tribes to fill the void caused by the Brahmaputra Valley's depopulation due to the Moamoria rebellion and Burmese invasions of Assam, permanently changing Assam's demographics. The rapid influx of Bengalis led to the rise of anti-Bengali sentiment among the Assamese during the colonial era. In 1836 British colonial authorities in Assam stipulated that Bengali would be the official language in the region (which included the Bengali-majority districts of Cachar, Hailakandi and Karimganj in the Barak Valley), a policy which remained in force until 1873. Combined with their superior English-language skills, the policy allowed middle class Bengalis to dominate clerical jobs in Assam, leading to resentment from the Assamese majority.

In 1873, the same year the Bengali language policy was reversed, colonial authorities introduced the Inner Line, which segregated Bengali settlers in Assam from the Assamese to prevent the outbreak of conflict caused by Assamese resentment of foreign encroachment. From 1921 to 1931 the Inner Line system was enforced in Nawgaon district, where immigrants constituted 14% of the population. It was also implemented in Barpeta sub-division of Kamrup and Darang. In 1937, a 9-member Line System Committee was formed by the government. The general consensus of the committee was that "the line system was a temporary mechanism created to check the unrestricted inflow of the immigrants into open areas and to protect the demographic composition against disruption and disturbance". However, even after successive governments, the line system was not abolished, continuing to segregate Bengalis from the indigenous and tribal people. The hostilites were further exacerbated by the partition of Bengal in 1947, as part of the partition of India, with many East Bengali refugees migrating into Assam. The 1971 Bangladesh Liberation War also saw Bengalis escaping the Bangladesh genocide and migrating into the state.

Neglect of Northeast India, especially regarding the India-Bangladesh border by the union government has fostered illegal immigration of Bangladeshi Muslims seeking better economic opportunities and Bangladeshi Hindus fleeing religious persecution into Assam. The continued flow of Bengali immigration into the state is cited as the main reason for anti-Bengali sentiment among the Assamese and tribal communities, which finally burst out in the 1980s as the Assam movement. Bengali Hindus and Bengali Muslims have been targeted by Assamese nationalist organisations and political parties. They are discriminatively tagged as "Bongal" (outsider Bengalis) in the context of Assam's linguistic politics. Bengalis living in Assam are routinely called 'Bangladeshis' and harassed.

On 10 October 1960, Bimala Prasad Chaliha, the then-Chief Minister of Assam, presented a bill in the Legislative Assembly to declare Assamese as the sole official language of the Assam. Ranendra Mohan Das, the then-MLA from Karimganj (North) assembly constituency and an ethnic Bengali, protested against the bill, arguing that it would impose the language of one third of the population over the remaining two thirds. On 24 October, the bill was passed in the Assam legislative assembly, thereby marking Assamese as the only official language of the state. The law forcefully imposed Assamese on Bengalis in terms of employment and education. This resulted in massive protests from the Barak Valley, which was home to many East Bengali refugees. These protests succeeded in establishing Bengali as an additional official language in the Barak Valley, which led to a reactive insurgency by the Assamese against the Bengalis in Assam and to numerous massacres.

In 1972, during the Assamese language movement, Bengalis were targeted. In Gauhati University, Bengali Hindus were attacked. Around 14,000 Bengali Hindus fled to West Bengal and elsewhere in the Northeast. Agitation in 1979 led to frequent curfews and strikes called by the All Assam Students' Union (AASU) and other local organisations. Trains were attacked, and central government employees of the Oil and Natural Gas Corporation, Indian Airlines, and the Railways were intimidated and asked to leave the state. Bengali settlements were attacked throughout the Brahmaputra Valley. In 1983, Bengali Hindus were attacked numerous times during the agitation. Abusive graffiti targeting Bengali Hindus became commonplace and Assamese rioters referred to then West Bengal chief minister Jyoti Basu as the "Bastard son of Bengal". Effigies of Basu were also hung from light posts and trees.

==== Bongal Kheda (1960s) ====
In June 1960, during the anti-Bengali Bongal Kheda (lit. 'Expell the Bengali') movement, frequent attacks on Bengali Hindus started in Cotton College in Guwahati and then spread to the rest of the state. An Assamese mob attacked innocent Bengali Hindu settlements in the Brahmaputra Valley. The District Magistrate of Guwahati, who was a Bengali Hindu, was attacked by a mob of around 100 people inside his residence and stabbed. Another Bengali Hindu, the Deputy Inspector General of Police, was also stabbed. Bengali students of Guwahati University, Dibrugarh Medical College and Assam Medical College were forcibly expelled from these institutions. In Dibrugarh, Bengali Hindu houses were looted and burnt, and their occupants were beaten up, knifed, and driven out. 500,000 Bengalis were displaced from Assam and taken to West Bengal.

==== Goreswar massacre (1960) ====
The Goreswar massacre was a planned attack on Bengali Hindus living in Goreswar in the Kamrup district (now the Baksa district). As per a secret July meeting at a school in Sibsagar, a students' strike was organised for the next day at Sibsagar. Groups of students and youths were sent to Jorhat, Dibrugarh, and other adjoining areas to communicate the decision of the meeting. In the Brahmaputra Valley, Assamese mobs started attacking Bengalis. On 14 July 1960, riots began in Sibsagar with the looting of Bengali shops and assaults on several Bengalis. In lower Assam (Kamrup, Nawgaon and Goalpara), intense violence occurred in 25 villages in Goreswar. An Assamese mob of 15,000, armed with guns and other weapons, attacked Bengali shops and houses, destroying 4,019 huts and 58 houses. According to the inquiry commission, at least nine Bengalis were killed, one woman was attacked and raped, and nearly 1,000 Bengali Hindus fled from the area during the riot. The violence continued for months. Between July and September 1960, nearly 50,000 Bengali Hindus fled to West Bengal.

==== North Kamrup violence (1980) ====
In some districts of lower Assam, Kamrupi Bengali Hindus were harassed as foreigners and became the target of violence. On 3 January 1980, a group of students of Baganpara High School were visiting Barikadanga to supervise a three-day strike in response to a call given by the AASU for supporting the anti-Bengali movement. In 1981, the Assamese killed nearly 100 Kamrupi Bengali Hindus. Along with Assamese locals, Kamrupi Muslims attacked the Bengali Hindus and spread violence.

==== Khoirabari massacre (1983) ====
After the partition of India, Bengali Hindus from India and Bengali Hindu refugees from East Bengal settled in Khoirabari in the Mangaldoi sub-division of the Darrang district. During the assembly election on 14 February 1983, the activists of the Assam movement blocked access and cut communications to the Bengali enclaves. Assamese groups, who held resentments towards the Bengalis, took advantage of the resulting isolation and surrounded and attacked the Bengali villages at night. As result, the Central Reserve Police Force and polling agents could not be sent to Khoirabari. Bengali Hindus had taken shelter at the Khoirabari School, where the Assamese mob attacked them. According to Indian Police Service officer E. M. Rammohun, more than 100 immigrant Bengali Hindus refugees were killed in the massacre. According to journalist Shekhar Gupta, more than 500 immigrant Bengali Hindus were killed. The survivors took shelter in the Khoirabari railway station.

==== Silapathar massacre (1983) ====
In Silapathar, undivided Lakhimpur district, Assam, Bengali Hindus had been residents for two decades, as an ethnic minority in the region. In February 1983, Assamese mobs attacked the Bengali villagers with machetes, bows and arrows, burnt houses, and destroyed several bridges which connected the remote area. The villagers escaped into the jungle, and spent days without adequate food or shelter. Journalist Sabita Goswami claimed that according to government sources, more than 1,000 people were killed in the clashes. The survivors fled to Arunachal Pradesh.

==== Nellie massacre (1983) ====
In the assembly elections of 1983, Indira Gandhi gave the right to vote to 4 million immigrants from Bangladesh. After the decision, the AASU launched a pogrom on 18 February 1983, attacking Bengali Muslims in 14 villages. The massacre claimed the lives of 2,191 people, with unofficial figures estimating more than 10,000 dead. No one was held responsible for these mass killings as a part of the 1985 Assam Accord.

==== 2000 onwards ====
On 1 November 2018, five Bengali Hindus were killed on the banks of Brahmaputra near Kherbari village in the Tinsukia district of Assam. United Liberation Front of Asom were suspected to be responsible for the massacre.

In 2021, two Bengali Muslims were killed during an eviction drive by the government of Assam.

=== Meghalaya ===
Presence of Bengalis in Shillong date back to the British conquest of the region, which was further enlarged following the partition of Bengal. Most of the Assamese left the area after Assam was formed, but Indian Bengalis who settled during the British rule and refugees from East Bengal remained there. Assam's Bongal Kheda movement influenced Meghalaya to drive Bengalis and other minorities out of the state. The Khasi Students' Union (KSU) was created on 20 March 1978 for this purpose.

1979's Khasi-Bengali riot was the first major riot in Shillong which was directed against the local Bengali minority. On 22 October 1979, a fight between Khasis and Bengalis took place after a Khasi man allegedly damaged the Kali idol of Lal Villa. Afterwards, Bengali houses across Laitumukhra in Shillong were burnt down by the Khasi tribes. The riots escalated strife between these communities, which would continue through the 1980s and 1990s. Nearly 20,000 Bengalis were displaced from the state in 1979, mainly from the capital Shillong, following an anti-Bengali riot. A separatist militant outfit, Hynniewtrep National Liberation Council (HNLC), was created, and instigated several riots in 1992. Most of the Bengalis moved to West Bengal or the Barak Valley of Assam, or became internal refugees in Assam.

==== 2000 onwards ====
After 2008, the situation was relatively peaceful in Shillong. From 2006 to 2017, the HNLC members increased from 4 lakh to more than a million.

In February 2020, the HNLC warned all Bengali Hindus to leave the Ichamati and Majai areas within one month. In a statement, HNLC general secretary Sainkumar Nongtraw warned of "mass bloodshed" if Bengali Hindus did not leave Meghalaya. After two days, more than a dozen non-tribals (including Bengalis) were assaulted by a group of masked tribal assailants in different parts of the Khasi Hills, and ten men were stabbed in Shillong. Members of the Student's Union tried to burn down a house, which led to retaliation from the local non-tribals.

KSU, continuing its influence in Meghalaya, put up banners and posters, saying "All Meghalaya Bengalis are Bangladeshis".

=== Tripura ===
According to royal census reports, in 1947, 93% of Tripura's population consisted of Kokborok-speaking Tripuri citizens After the partition of India, Bengali Hindus from neighbouring Comilla, Noakhali and Chittagong districts of then East Bengal, as well as Brahmanberia area of Dhaka district, and Moulavibazar area of Sylhet (which was incorporated into East Bengal despite the results of the 1947 referendum) fled into the princely state. This triggered a population explosion from 646,000 in 1951 to 1.15 million in 1961 and 1.5 million in 1971. This resulted in the Tripuri population share shrinking to 28.5 per cent. Immigration of East Bengali Hindus into Tripura continued following the 1950 riots, 1964 riots and the Bangladesh Liberation War. In 1977, a section of the Tripuris formed a political party called Tripura Upajati Juba Samiti (TUJS), which began to back extremist movements. Their motive was to drive out "foreigners," i.e. Bengalis, from the state. TUJS leaders drew up an action programme for Bengali expulsion in the 1980s.

The Nagarik Suraksha Mancha, a jointly-formed organisation for Bengalis, has blamed the Tipra Motha Party (The Indigenous Progressive Regional Alliance) its leader Pradyot Debbarma for the plight of Bengalis in Tripura and for allegedly spreading anti-Bengali sentiment among the Tripuri people.

==== Mandai massacre (1980) ====
Mandai, an obscure village located about 60 km north east of Agartala, is inhabited primarily by Tripuris with a Bengali minority. On the night of 6 June 1980, armed Tripuri tribal insurgent groups began to block the nontribal localities and to commit arson, violence and murder. Thousands of Bengalis took shelter near the National Highway 44, and a relief camp was established at Khayerpur School where initial relief was administered to the Bengali refugees. From the afternoon of 7 June, the situation worsened, with reports of large-scale arson and looting in Jirania block, as well as arson on Bengali villages in Champaknagar and the foothills of Baramura. Many Bengalis had taken shelter at the police outpost in Mandwi, which remained unmanned. An entire village was fired in Purba Noabadi. In Mandwi almost all houses and huts were destroyed, and 350-400 Bengalis were killed. Those who survived were given shelter across different schools of Agartala.

==== Bagber massacre (2000) ====
Bagber is a village under the Kalyanpur police station in the West Tripura district of Tripura. In May 2000, during the ongoing ethnic riots, scores of Bengali Hindus had taken shelter at a refugee camp in Bagber. On 20 May, a heavily armed group of around 60 National Liberation Front of Tripura militants raided the Bagber village. The militants then targeted the inmates at the refugee camp, where they killed around 20 and injured several others.

==== 2020 Bru-resettlement ====
The governments of Tripura and Mizoram and representatives of Bru organisations signed an agreement on 16 January 2019 to allow nearly 35,000 Bru tribal people, who were displaced from Mizoram and lived in Tripura as refugees since 1997, to settle permanently in Tripura. The Tripura government selected 12 places including Kanchanpur. This resulted in conflict between the Brus and the local Bengali non-tribal people who used to live there for decades. Protests took place against the settlement, and the state government used violence in dispersing the mobs. Over 6,000 Bengali people were thrown out of their homes by Bru migrants. After the violence of 10 December, Nagarik Suraksha Mancha was formed for the protection of Bengalis. On 21 November 2020, one Bengali was killed and more than 20 were injured in open fire from police.

== Pakistan ==
Jamaat-e-Islami Pakistan is an Islamist political party. It is the Pakistani successor to Jamaat-e-Islami, which was founded in British India in 1941. JIP opposed the Bangladesh Liberation War (1971), with Islami Jamiat-e-Talaba, its student organisation, organising the Al-Badr paramilitary group to fight the Mukti Bahini (the Bengali nationalist guerrilla movement). JIP members collaborated with the Pakistan Army in perpetrating the Bangladesh genocide.

=== 1971 Bangladesh genocide ===
The Bangladesh genocide (Note: Bengali: একাত্তরের গণহত্যা, romanized: Ēkātturēr Gôṇôhôtyā, lit. '71's genocide' or বাঙালি গণহত্যা, Bāṅāli Gôṇôhôtyā, 'Bengali genocide') was the ethnic cleansing of Bengalis residing in East Pakistan (now Bangladesh) during the Bangladesh Liberation War, perpetrated by the Pakistan Army and the Razakars militia. It began on 25 March 1971, as Operation Searchlight was launched by West Pakistan (now Pakistan) to militarily subdue the Bengali population of East Pakistan; the Bengalis comprised the demographic majority and had been calling for independence from the Pakistani state. Seeking to curtail the Bengali self-determination movement, Pakistani president Yahya Khan approved a large-scale military deployment, and in the nine-month-long conflict that ensued, Pakistani soldiers and local pro-Pakistan militias killed between 300,000 and 3,000,000 Bengalis and raped between 200,000 and 400,000 Bengali women in a systematic campaign of mass killing and genocidal sexual violence. Non-Bengali Bihari women were also raped during and after the war.

West Pakistanis in particular were shown by the news that the operation was carried out because of the 'rebellion by the East Pakistanis' and many activities at the time were hidden from them, including rape and ethnic cleansing of East Pakistanis by the Pakistani military. Although the majority of the victims were Bengali Muslims, Hindus who were especially targeted. In their investigation of the genocide, the Geneva-based International Commission of Jurists concluded that Pakistan's campaign also involved the attempt to exterminate or forcibly remove a significant portion of the country's Hindu populace. The West Pakistani government, which had implemented discriminatory legislation in East Pakistan, asserted that Hindus were behind the Mukti Bahini (Bengali resistance fighters) revolt and that resolving the local "Hindu problem" would end the conflict—Khan's government and the Pakistani elite thus regarded the crackdown as a strategic policy. Genocidal rhetoric accompanied the campaign: Pakistani men believed that the sacrifice of Hindus was needed to fix the national malaise. In the countryside, Pakistani forces moved through villages and specifically asked for places where Hindus lived before burning them down. Hindus were identified by checking circumcision or by demanding the recitation of Muslim prayers. This also resulted in the migration of around eight million East Pakistani refugees into India, 80–90% of whom were Hindus.

Both Muslim and Hindu women were targeted for rape. West Pakistani forces wanted to cleanse a nation corrupted by the presence of Hindus and believed that the sacrifice of Hindu women was needed; Bengali women were thus viewed as Hindu or Hindu-like.

Pakistan's activities during the Bangladesh Liberation War served as a catalyst for India's military intervention in support of the Mukti Bahini, triggering the Indo-Pakistani War that began on December 3, 1971. The conflict and the genocide formally ended on 16 December 1971, when the joint forces of Bangladesh and India received the Pakistani Instrument of Surrender. As a result of the conflict, approximately 10 million East Bengali refugees fled to Indian territory while up to 30 million people were internally displaced out of the 70 million total population of East Pakistan. There was also ethnic violence between the Bengali majority and the Bihari minority during the conflict; between 1,000 and 150,000 Biharis were killed in reprisal attacks by Bengali militias and mobs, as Bihari collaboration with the West Pakistani campaign had led to further anti-Bihari sentiment. Since Pakistan's defeat and Bangladesh's independence, the title "Stranded Pakistanis in Bangladesh" has commonly been used to refer to the Bihari community, which was denied the right to hold Bangladeshi citizenship until 2008.

Allegations of a genocide in Bangladesh were rejected by most UN member states at the time and rarely appear in textbooks and academic sources on genocide studies.

==== Perpetrators ====
- Pakistan Army, committed the genocide in East Pakistan (now Bangladesh).
- Razakars, a gendarmerie and paramilitary force in East Pakistan organised by General Tikka Khan in 1971. They were organised as a counter-insurgency force to fight Mukti Bahini, and played an infamous role in the 1971 Bangladesh genocide. The Razakars were disbanded following Pakistan's defeat and surrender in the war.
- Al-Badr, a militia composed mainly of pro-Pakistan militants mostly Bihari Muslims and Muhajirs, which operated in East Pakistan against the Bengali nationalist movement under the patronage of the government of Pakistan.
- Al-Shams, a collaborationist paramilitary wing allied with several Islamist parties in East Pakistan, comprising both local Bengalis and Muhajirs. Alongside the Pakistan Army and Al-Badr, Al-Shams has been accused of participating in widespread atrocities against Bengali nationalists, civilians, and religious and ethnic minorities during the 1971 genocide. Following the war, the government of Bangladesh officially banned the group.
- East Pakistan Central Peace Committee, one of several committees formed in East Pakistan in 1971 to aid war efforts of the Pakistani forces. Nurul Amin, as a leader of Pakistan Democratic Party, led the formation of the Committee to thwart the Mukti Bahini.
- Mujahid Bahini, an East Pakistani paramilitary force that fought against the Mukti Bahini and aided the Pakistan Army.

=== Post 1971 ===
By the 1990s continuous migration of Bangladeshis, mostly illegal, crossed the 1,500,000 mark. During the administration of Prime Minister Benazir Bhutto, members of the political party became concerned with the large Bangladeshi migrant population, afraid they could become the second largest group in Karachi after the Muhajir people and disturb sensitive demographics. Crime was also becoming a rising concern. Accordingly, Bhutto ordered a crackdown and deportation of Bangladeshi immigrants. Benazir Bhutto's action strained and created tensions in Bangladesh–Pakistan relations, with Khaleda Zia, who was in power in Dhaka during the time, refusing to accept the deportees and reportedly sending two planeloads back towards Pakistan and Muslim political parties in Pakistan criticising Bhutto and dubbing the crackdown as anti-Islamic. She was ultimately forced to abandon the order.

== Myanmar ==
Bengali Hindu villages in a cluster known as Kha Maung Seik in the northern Maungdaw District of Rakhine State in Myanmar were attacked on 25 August 2017, and 99 Bengali Hindu villagers were massacred by Rohingya insurgents from the Arakan Rohingya Salvation Army (ARSA). A month later, the Myanmar Army discovered mass graves containing the corpses of 45 Hindus, most of whom were women and children.

== Anti-discrimination movements ==
Many organisations were founded to protest ongoing discrimination and anti-Bengali sentiment.

=== India ===
==== Bengali language movements in India ====
The Bengali Language Movement is a campaign to preserve Bengali language and Bengali culture and to oppose anti-Bengali sentiment in India. The movement was started in Manbhum in 1940, ahead of the Partition of India which allocated eastern Bengal to the new nation of Pakistan and led to the relocation of many Bengali communities. In 1947 British India bifurcated into India and Pakistan. The population of the eastern part of Bengal was majority Muslim, and was incorporated into Pakistan. Bengali Hindus in this eastern region migrated to India, principally settling in West Bengal, Chhattisgarh, Dandakaranya and Odisha, Maharashtra, Karnataka. The Movement remains prominent in Assam, Jharkhand, Bihar, Chhattisgarh and Karnataka.

===== Bengali language movement in Assam =====
80% of Assam's Barak Valley are Bengali and speak Bengali, but a bill was passed in the Assam legislative assembly making Assamese the sole official language of the state. On 5 February 1961, the Cachar Gana Sangram Parishad was formed to protest the imposition of Assamese in the Bengali-speaking Barak Valley. People soon started protesting in Silchar, Karimganj and Hailakandi. On 24 April, the Parishad flagged off a fortnight-long padayatra in the Barak Valley to raise awareness among the masses, which ended after 200 miles and reaching Silchar on 2 May.

On 18 May, the Assam police arrested three prominent leaders of the movement, namely Nalinikanta Das, Rathindranath Sen and Bidhubhushan Chowdhury, the editor of weekly Yugashakti. On 19 May, the dawn to dusk hartal started. Picketing started in the sub-divisional towns of Silchar, Karimganj and Hailakandi. A Bedford truck carrying 9 arrested activists from Katigorah was fired and the truck driver and the policemen escorting the arrested fled the spot. Soon after that the paramilitary forces, guarding the railway station, started beating the protesters with rifle butts and batons without any provocation from them. They fired 17 rounds into the crowd. Twelve persons received bullet wounds and were carried to hospitals. Nine of them died that day. Two more persons died later. One person, Krishna Kanta Biswas survived for another 24 hours with a bullet wound in chest.

On 20 May, the people of Silchar held a procession with the bodies of the martyrs in protest of the killings. After the incident and more protests, the Assam government had to withdraw the circular and Bengali was ultimately given official status in the three districts of Barak Valley.

===== Bengali language movement in Bihar =====
The Bengali Language Movement of Manbhum was a cultural and political movement that took place in the then Bihar Province from 1912 to 1956. Post independence, between 1948 and 1956, the language movement spread intensely among the Bengalis of Manbhum. Through this movement created around the Bengali language, the public demand for the establishment of Bengali as one of the official languages of the Bihar, mainly Manbhum, was expressed. This language movement was first ever linguistic movement for Bengali language and the longest language movement in the world.

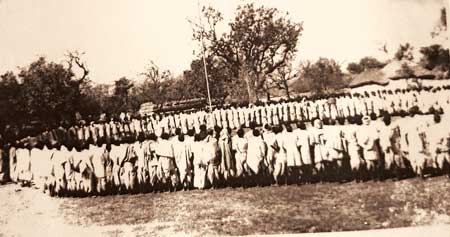
Protesters take oath in Pakbirra for language movement

The Bihar and Orissa Province was formed in 1912 by dividing the Bengal Presidency. At that time Bengali speaking Manbhum was included in the newly formed province. In 1936, the Bihar and Orissa Province was divided to form the Bihar Province, but Bengali-speaking Manbhum was kept with Hindi-dominant Bihar Province. In 1948, the then Government of Bihar declared Hindi as the only official language in the whole of Bihar including Manbhum. In the context of these incidents, deep anger was born among the Bengali-speaking common people of Manbhum and created adverse reactions. Practically the Bengali speaking people of Manbhum could not accept this unfair decision and were not mentally prepared at all. As a result, the movement in Manbhum to demand the equal status of Bengali language quickly spread. To suppress the movement, the Government of Bihar declared protest marches, meetings etc. illegal and prohibited.

The growing mass movement finally forced the Government of Bihar to capitulate. In 1956, the Government of India split Manbhum district to form Purulia district and merged it with West Bengal as a new district.

==== Organisations ====
- United Bengali Liberation Front (UBLF): Designed as a militant group, was created to protect Indian Bengalis against Tripuri militants and other tribal groups. The UBLF came into existence in 1995 after the militant All Tripura Tiger Force was formed against Bengali Hindus living in Tripura. The UBLF, though not a proscribed outfit under the Prevention of Terrorism Act, 2002, has been banned by the Tripura government for its involvement in the activities of separatist killings and murders.
- United Bengal Liberation Army (UBLA): A militant outfit that claims to stand upright for Bengalis. They have condemned atrocities and discrimination against Bengali people in Meghalaya and released an ultimatum against anti-Bengali activities, warning of serious consequences.
- Amra Bangali: In 1981, amid anti-Bengali violence in Northeast India, Amra Bangalee sparked protests. The socio-political party is based on Prabhat Ranjan Sarkar's progressive utilization theory. The party's primary goal was to stop Bengali eviction in Assam and the Northeast. They won some gram panchayat seats in the elections. In the 1980s, they entered the Tripura Legislative Assembly. Amra Bangali also demands a separate state as a homeland for Bengalis, where the Bengali language would be used in all official and non-official works.
- Lok Sewak Sangh: Formed during the Manbhum Bengali language movement to promote use of the Bengali language in Bengali-dominated areas in southern Bihar state. They labelled the imposition of Hindi as 'linguistic imperialism'. After breaking with the Indian National Congress, their elected officials resigned and were re-elected on LSS tickets.
- Nagarik Suraksha Mancha: Formed during the 2020 Bru-resettlement in Tripura, when Bengali lands were given to the Bru tribals and police violence against Bengalis occurred. The organisation provided the government with an 11-point demand, which includes repatriating Bru migrants to Mizoram and compensating those affected by violence during anti-Citizenship Amendment Bill protests. They placed strikes and protests against the government to secure land for Bengalis.
- Bangla Pokkho: Founded in 2019 by Indian Statistical Institute professor Garga Chatterjee, to protest Hindi and Urdu linguistic and cultural imposition. The organisation demands 100% reservation of government jobs for residents of West Bengal and 90% reservation in other job sectors, education, military, and administrative works. Bangla Pokkho's demands resulted in the beginning of domicile reservation at Calcutta University and Jadavpur University, the cancellation of expelling Bengalis in WBSEDCL, and allowing majority Bengali players in Cricket Association of Bengal as well as the inclusion of Bengali language in online platforms. Bangla Pokkho, along with Kanchanpur Nagarik Surakkha Mancha, cultivated a protest in Tripura that gathered more than 30,000 Bengalis to complain about social discrimination of Bengalis and the Bru-resettlement by the Tripura state BJP Government.
- Bangla o Bangla Bhasha Bachao Committee (BOBBBC): A Siliguri-based organisation that has protested against Gorkhaland formation. They accused the Gorkha Janmukti Morcha of anti-Bengali activities in Darjeeling.
- Jatiya Bangla Sommelan: Created on 9 December 2019 as a split from Bangla Pokkho. Both Jatiyo Bangla Sommelon and Bangla Pokkho came into being to counter the "imposition of Hindi" and "north Indian culture". Jatiyo Bangla Sammelan has demonstrated against the Citizenship Amendment Act in different parts of West Bengal. It has protested against the performing of Chhath puja (a Hindu festival popular in neighbouring Bihar) in Kolkata.
- Bhumiputra Unnayan Morcha of India (BHUMI): Founded on 16 July 2020 with a vision to spread political and social awareness among the people of Bengal and India to achieve constitutional rights and social justice and resist the forceful impose of any non-Bengali language and culture.

=== Pakistan ===
==== Bengali language movement ====
The Bengali language movement (Note: Bengali: বাংলা ভাষা আন্দোলন, romanized: Bangla bhasha andōlonpronounced [ˈbaŋlaˑ ˈbʱaʃaˑ ˈand̪olɔn]) was a political movement in East Bengal (Note: Renamed East Pakistan in 1955. East Bengal was the administrative division of the Dominion of Pakistan corresponding to today's Bangladesh from 1947 to 1955.) in 1952, advocating the recognition of the Bengali language as a co-lingua franca of the Dominion of Pakistan. The movement wanted to allow its use in government affairs, the continuation of its use as a medium of education, its use in media, currency and stamps, and to maintain its writing in the Bengali alphabet and Bengali script.

When the Dominion of Pakistan was formed after the separation of the Indian subcontinent in 1947, when the British left, it was composed of various ethnic and linguistic groups, with the geographically non-contiguous East Bengal province having a mainly ethnic Bengali population. In 1948, the Government of the Dominion of Pakistan ordained as part of Islamization of East Pakistan or East Bengal that Urdu will be the sole federal language, alternately Bengali writing in the Perso-Arabic script or Roman script (Romanisation of Bengali) or Arabic as the state language of the whole of Pakistan was also proposed, sparking extensive protests among the Bengali-speaking majority of East Bengal. Facing rising sectarian tensions and mass discontent with the new law, the government outlawed public meetings and rallies. The students of the University of Dhaka and other political activists defied the law and organised a protest on 21 February 1952. The movement reached its climax when police killed student demonstrators on that day. The deaths provoked widespread civil unrest. After years of conflict, the central government relented and granted official status to the Bengali language in 1956.

The Language Movement catalysed the assertion of Bengali national identity in East Bengal and later East Pakistan, and became a forerunner to Bengali nationalist movements, including the 6-Point Movement and subsequently the Bangladesh Liberation War and the Bengali Language Implementation Act, 1987. In Bangladesh, 21 February (Ekushey February) is observed as Language Movement Day, a national holiday. The Shaheed Minar monument was constructed near Dhaka Medical College in memory of the movement and its victims. On 17 November 1999, UNESCO declared 21 February as International Mother Language Day, in tribute to the Language Movement and the ethnolinguistic rights of people around the world.

== See also ==
- Persecution of Bengali Hindus
- Persecution of Bengali Muslims
- Anti-Hindi agitations of West Bengal
- National Register of Citizens
- Racism in India
  - Racism against Northeast Indians
- Racism in Pakistan
- Racism in Myanmar
  - Rohingya genocide
- Racism in Bangladesh
  - Persecution of Biharis in Bangladesh

== Sources ==
- Boissoneault, Lorraine (16 December 2016). "The Genocide the U.S. Can't Remember, But Bangladesh Can't Forget". Smithsonian Magazine. Archived from the original on 17 December 2016.
- Chakravarti, K.C. (30 July 1960). "Bongal Kheda Again" (PDF). The Economic Weekly. Mumbai: Sameeksha Trust: 1193–95. ISSN 0012-9976.
- D'Costa, Bina (2011). Nationbuilding, Gender and War Crimes in South Asia. Routledge. ISBN 978-0-415-56566-0.
- Dummett, Mark (16 December 2011). "Bangladesh war: The article that changed history". BBC News. Archived from the original on 8 May 2019.
- Mookherjee, Nayanika (2 November 2021). "Historicising the Birangona : Interrogating the Politics of Commemorating the Wartime Rape of 1971 in the Context of the 50 th Anniversary of Bangladesh". Strategic Analysis. 45 (6): 588–597. doi:10.1080/09700161.2021.2009663. ISSN 0970-0161. S2CID 246760529.
