= Bengali Hindus in Assam =

Bengali Hindu community in Assam

Bengalis of Assam অসমৰ বঙালী হিন্দু আসামের বাঙালি হিন্দু
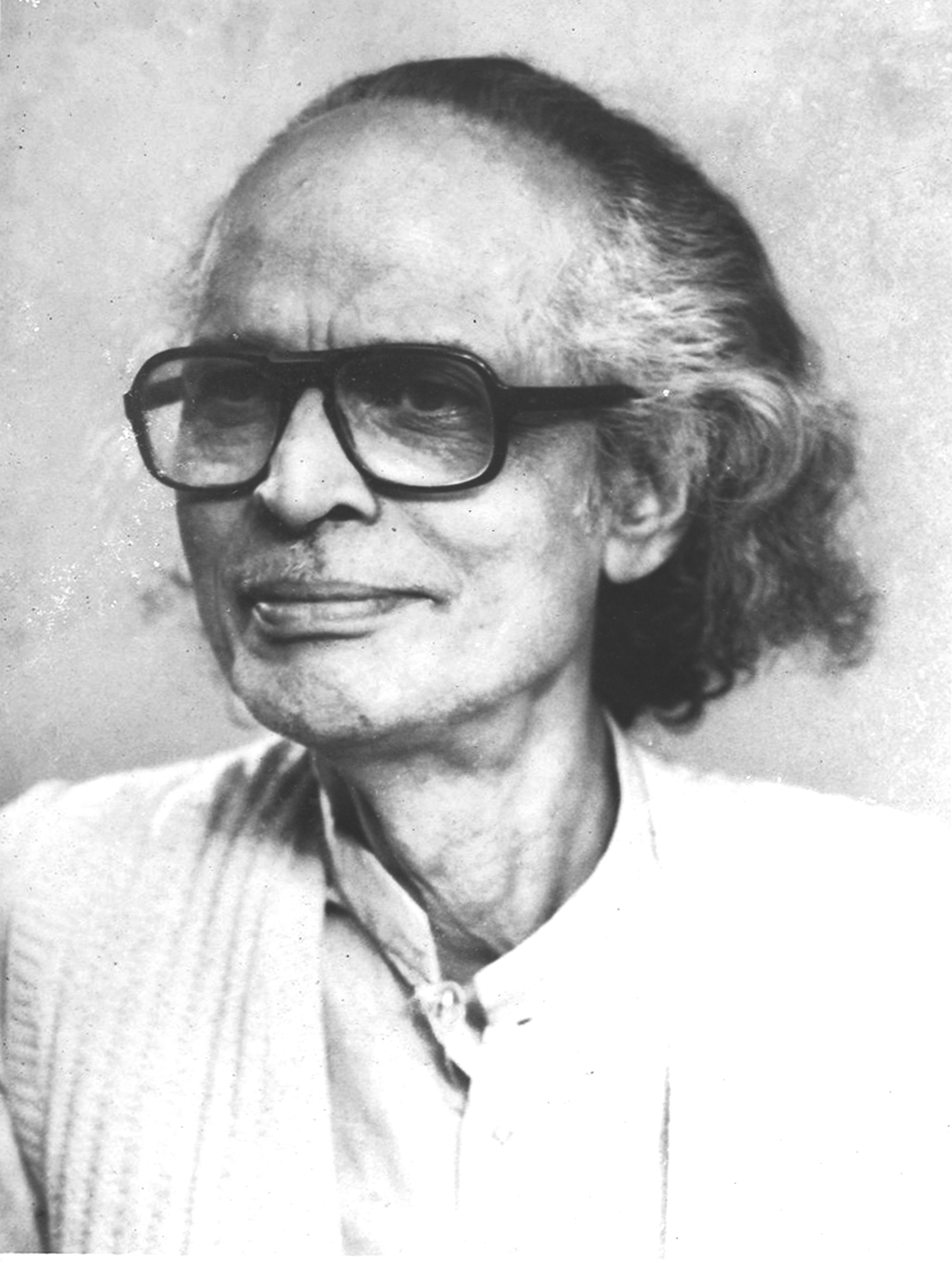
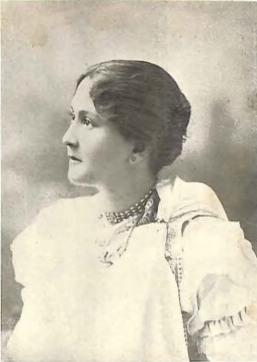
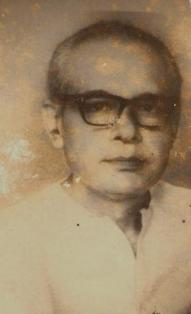
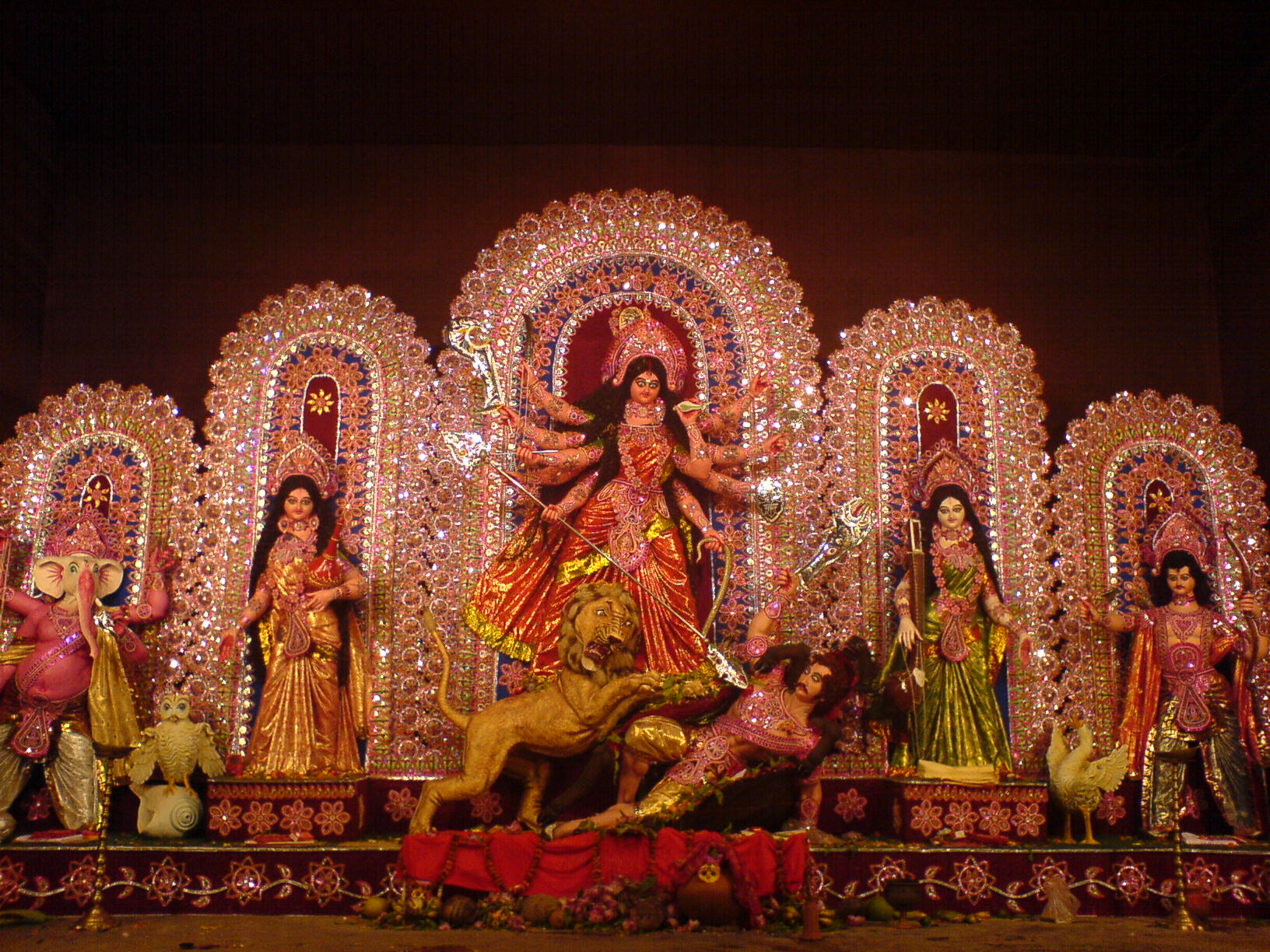
- Hemanga Biswas, Assamese and Bengali folk singer Pragyasundari Devi, author, and wife of Lakshminath Bezbarua Robin Dey, Assamese thriller novelist, known as Rongmon Durga Puja Pandal in Assam. Bengali Swastika

Total population
- 6,022,677–7,502,012 (est. 2011) (19.3%–25% of the Assam's population)▲

Regions with significant populations
- Brahmaputra Valley: 4.5 - 5 Million
- Barak Valley: 2 Million

Religions
- Hinduism Primary: Shaktism Secondary: Vaishnavism and Shaivism

Languages
- Mother Tongue - Bengali and its dialects 2nd language - Assamese Sacred language - Sanskrit

The Bengali Hindus are the second-largest ethno-religious group just after Assamese Hindus in Assam. As per as estimation research, around 6–7.5 million Bengali Hindus live in Assam as of 2011, majority of whom live in Brahmaputra Valley and a significant population also resides in the Barak Valley. The Bengali Hindus are today mostly concentrated in the Barak Valley region, and now are politically, economically and socially dominant. Assam hosts the second-largest Bengali Hindu population in India after West Bengal.

== History ==
=== Barak Valley ===
The Barak Valley region of Assam comprising the present districts of Cachar and Hailakandi (together formerly part of the Kachari kingdom) and Karimganj (formerly part of Sylhet), According to the Bhatera Copper Plate issued by Govinda-Kesavadeva ruler of Srihatta-Rajya a proto Bengali Kingdom ruled many places which now falls in present day Barak Valley, places like Katakhal, Kalain & Salchapra is mentioned on the copper plate which dates back to 1049A.D.

In census report of Assam in 1921 by G.T Lloyd, he stated that Bengali speakers in Cacher and Goalpara are Indigenous. Bengalis, according to historian J.B. Bhattacharjee, had settled here for more than 2 centuries. Bhattacharjee argues that the Dimasa kings spoke Bengali and the inscriptions and coins were written in Sanskrit in Bengali script. Migrations to Cachar increased after the British annexation of the region. Bengalis have been living in Barak Valley for at least 224 years.

While on a survey duty in Cachar in 1832, Pemberton mentioned as quoted "People in Sylhet and Cachar are identical in every respect – appearance, custom and language". In 1835 Pemberton reported according to Captain Fisher that the population of the Cachar plains was around 50,000 dominated by the Dimasa people, followed by Muslim immigrants from Sylhet and their descendants; a third group was Bengali and Assamese Hindu immigrants and their descendants and Naga, Kuki and Manipuris forming the smallest groups.

But In 1837 British Officer J.G Burns reported that the population of Cachar Plains were 50,000 and only a small portion of population were Dimasa, and majority were Bengali Hindus and Muslims and a few Manipuris, Nagas, kukies .According to David R. Syiemlieh, up to 1837 A.D. the plains of Cachar Valley were sparsely populated and were dominated by the Dimasa Cachari, a Tibeto Burmese tribe, under the rule of the Kachari Raja, who have established his kingdom's capital at Khaspur, Cachar plains. He had a good number of Bengali advisers (mostly Brahmins) around him and gave grants of land to some of them, but the population resembled that of the North Cachar Hills of today as evident from various historical chronicles and sources. The British Annexation of Cachar transformed the demographic patterns of the valley overnight. There was a sudden phenomenal growth in population, while the plains of Cachar had about 50,000 inhabitants in all in 1837 A.D. that is five years after its annexation. The population rose to more than five lakhs a few years later, which eventually indicates that there was a large-scale immigration.

For instance in the 1851 Census, the population of the Cachar Valley was recorded at 85,522, comprising diverse backgrounds including hill tribes. Muslims and Hindus, predominantly Bengalis, made up 30,708 and 30,573 individuals respectively, constituting 70% of the total population. The remaining population included 10,723 Manipuris, 6,320 Kukis, 5,645 Nagas, and 2,213 Cacharis.

=== Assam Valley ===
After the annexation of Assam (constituting 19% of present-day Assam) in 1826 A.D., the British encouraged the mass emigration of Bengali Hindus into Assam's mainland Brahmaputra Valley from the neighboring Bengal region in the first phase. This influx served to fill various roles within the colonial administration, including administrative workers, court officials, bankers, railway employees, businessmen, and bureaucrats. Bengali Hindus migrated during the Partition of Bengal in 1947 and before the Bangladesh Liberation War of 1971 as refugees, in the second and third phases respectively.

== Culture ==
The culture of Bengalis in Assam is mainly influenced by a hybrid mixture of Assamese-Bengali culture and traditions. Bengalis specially living in Assamese-dominated Brahmaputra Valley/Assam Valley speaks Bengali as their mother tongue, but also speaks Assamese as their 2nd language and have got assimilated into mainstream Assamese society as "Greater Assamese society". The Bengali identity as a whole, most particularly in Assam Valley is linguistic, while Bengali as an ethnic is considered as Assamese.

While in Barak Valley, the Bengali identity differs significantly from that in the Brahmaputra Valley of Assam. People in Barak Valley predominantly identify as Bengalis rather than as Assamese. This distinction is rooted in historical, cultural, and linguistic differences between the two valleys. Bengalis in Barak Valley often emphasize their distinct cultural heritage, which includes Bengali language, literature, music, and customs that are more closely aligned with neighbouring Sylhet region of Bangladesh rather than Assam. Many in Barak Valley express a desire for greater autonomy or even separation from Assam, advocating for recognition of their unique identity within India as separate state. This sentiment is reflected in formal discussions and political movements aimed at addressing their cultural and political aspirations, as well as the grievances of being deprived and neglected for years.

== Demography ==
=== Population ===
Assam has a large Bengali Hindu population as per as estimation research, but various sources have varied estimation of Bengali Hindu population in Assam, as the census of India, does not allow religious segregation of languages spoken, it is very difficult to arrive at official estimates of a religious-linguistic matrix for the Assam state. It has been said that Bengali Hindus are the third largest community in Assam after Assamese Hindus and Bengali Muslims (locally known as Miyas) with a population of 6 million approx, constituting 19.3% of state population as of 2011 census estimation figure by Assam government.

Number of Bengali Hindus residing in Assam (2010–2019 est. research by various agencies)
Source/claimed by	Population
Confusion, hope run high among Assam's Hindu Bengalis.	5,000,000
Claimed KMSS leader Akhil Gogoi.	10,000,000
Claimed AASU chief adviser Samujjal Bhattacharya.	7,000,000-7,200,000
BJP government estimation.	6,000,000
2016 Assam election assembly results.	6,000,000
Claimed by NDTV	5,620,000
Claimed by Morungexpress.	6,400,000
Claimed by Assam Bengali Hindu organization (ABHO).	6,500,000-7,200,000
Claimed by The All Assam Bengali Hindu Association (AABHA)	7,802,000
Claimed by Times of India	7,500,000
Claimed by Daily O News	7,000,000
Claimed by The Wire	5,900,000-7,500,000
Claimed by The News Web	7,500,000
Claimed by The Hindu	7,801,250

=== Geographical concentration ===
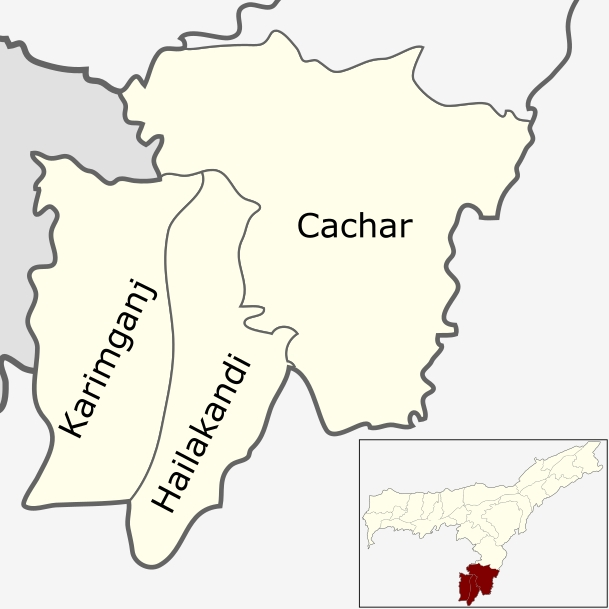
Barak Valley, a southern most Bengali majority region of Assam

They are highly concentrated in the Barak Valley region where they a form a slide majority and the population of Bengali Hindus in Barak Valley is 20 lakh, constituting 50% of the total population of the region.

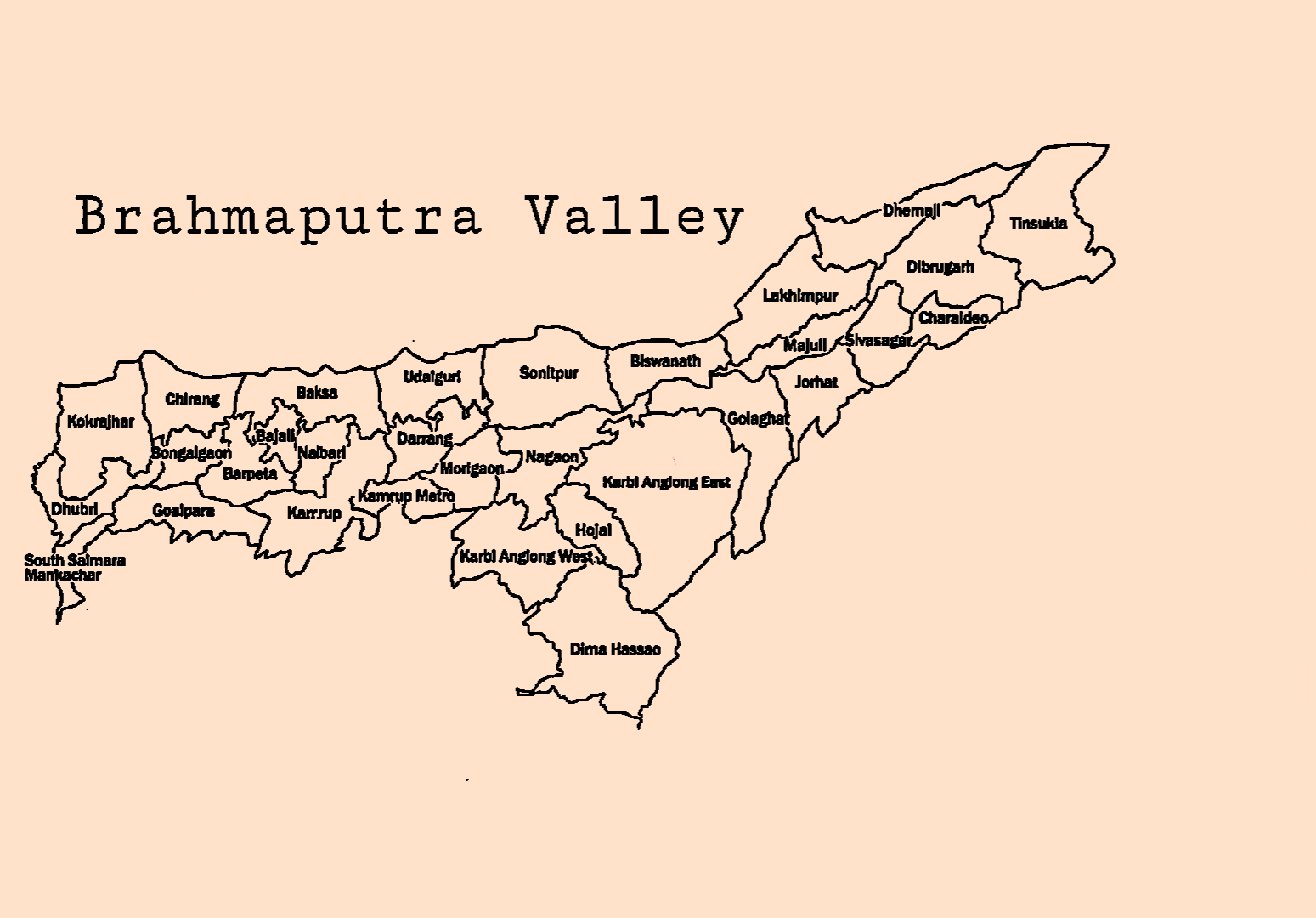
Map representing Assamese majority Brahmaputra Valley region of Assam

In Assam's Brahmaputra Valley region, there is no real data for Bengali Hindu population available through census, but it is just assumed that region Brahmaputra valley have around "40 Lakh Bengali Hindus" as per as New president of the All Assam Bengali Youth Students Federation (AABYSF), Mahananda Sarkar Dutta who have stated the above demographic statement.

== Social issues ==
=== Immigration ===
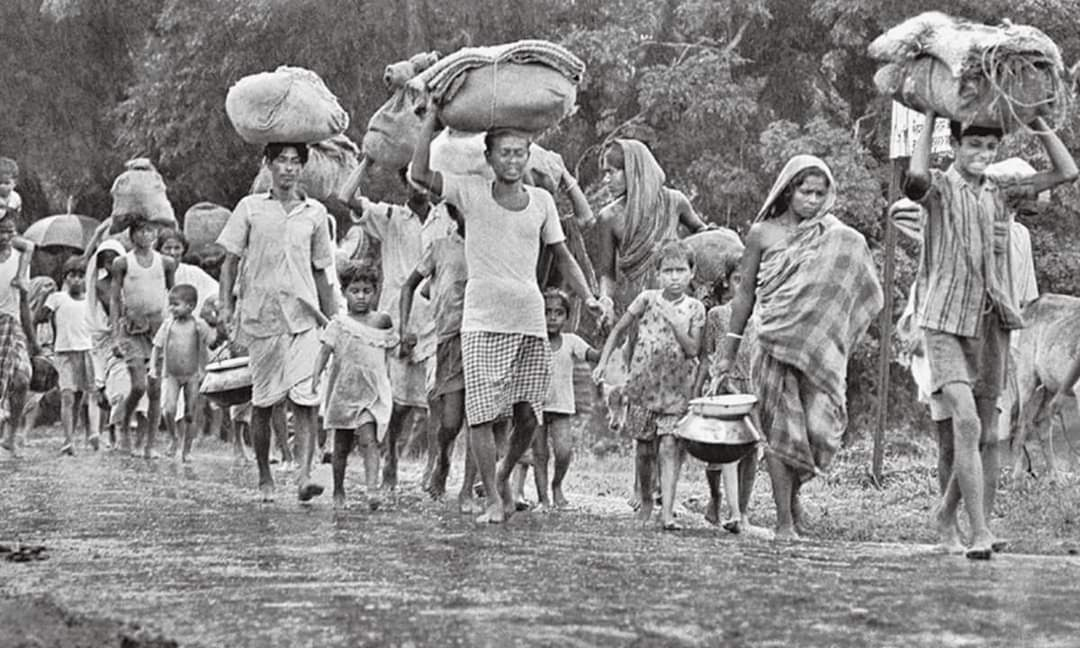
( Bengali Hindus of east pakistan coming to Tripura)

Since after partition of Bengal in 1947 there were large scale Bengali migration into Assam. Between the period of first patches (1946–1951), around 274,455 Bengali Hindu refugees have arrived from what is now called Bangladesh (former East Pakistan) in various locations of Assam as permanent settlers and again in second patches between (1952–1958) of the same decade, around 212,545 Bengali Hindus from Bangladesh took shelter in various parts of the state permanently. After the 1964 East Pakistan riots many Bengali Hindus have poured into Assam as refugees and the number of Hindu migrants in the state rose to 1,068,455 in 1968 (sharply after 4 years of the riot). The fourth patches numbering around 347,555 have just arrived after Bangladesh liberation war of 1971 as refugees and most have decided to stay back in Assam afterwards.

=== Politics and discrimination ===
Bengali Hindus are being targeted by xenophobic Assamese nationalist organization and political party from time to time. In the context of linguistic politics in Assam, Bengalis are discriminatively tagged as "Bongal" (outsiders), which is derogatory and a racial slur. Bengali Hindus living in Assam from decades before Bangladesh was born in 1971 are routinely called 'Bangladeshis' as because antipathy towards Bengalis is prime mover of Assam politics since the formation of All Assam Students Union. Bengali Hindus are being victimized due to D voter policy in the state as according to Sudip Sarma, the publicity secretary of the Assam unit of the Nikhil Bharat Bangali Udbastu Samanway Samiti, there are 6 lakh Bengali Hindu D voters in the state. Thousands of Bengalis are being held in Detention Camps. As far as NRC is concerned in the state, 40 lakhs names have been kept out from the second draft of NRC, out of which 12 lakhs were Bengali Hindus. The CAA bill which was passed at 2019 December have promised to give citizenship to Bengali refugees living in the state living in Assam prior to 1971. In January 2019, the Assam's peasant organisation Krishak Mukti Sangram Samiti (KMSS) claimed that there are around 2 million Bangladeshi Hindus in Assam who would become Indian citizens if the Citizenship (Amendment) Bill is passed. BJP, however claimed that only eight lakh Hindu Bangladeshis will get citizenship. The number of Hindu immigrants from Bangladesh in Barak Valley has varied estimates. According to the Assam government, 1.3-1.5 lakh such people residing in the Barak Valley are eligible for citizenship if the Citizenship Amendment Act of 2019 becomes a law. During Bongal Kheda (chased out Bengali) movement lakhs of Bengali Hindus were forcefully displaced from Assam and they subsequently took refugee in West Bengal, Barak Valley and Tripura. According to an estimate, roughly 500,000 Bengalis have left Assam, and thousands were killed in Goreswar, Khoirabari, Silapathar, and North Kamrup following attacks from radical Assamese nationalist mobs and the All Assam Students Union during the 1980s and 1960s.

=== 1960s Assam language riots ===
In Assam's, Assamese dominated Brahmaputra Valley region Bongal Kheda movement (which literally means drive out Bengalis) was happened in the late 1948–80s, where several thousands of Hindu Bengalis was massacred by jingoists Assamese nationalists mob in various parts of Assam and as a result of this jingoist movement, nearly 5 lakh Bengali Hindus were forced to flee from Assam to take shelter in neighbouring West Bengal particularly in Jalpaiguri division in seek for safety. In the Bengali dominated Barak Valley region of Assam, violence broke out in 1960 and 1961 between Bengali Hindus and ethnic Assam police over a state bill which would have made Assamese mandatory in the secondary education curriculum. On 19 May 1961, eleven Bengali protesters were killed by Assam police fired on a demonstration at the Silchar railway station. Subsequently, the Assam government allowed Bengali as the medium of education and held it as an official position in Barak Valley.

=== Statehood demand ===
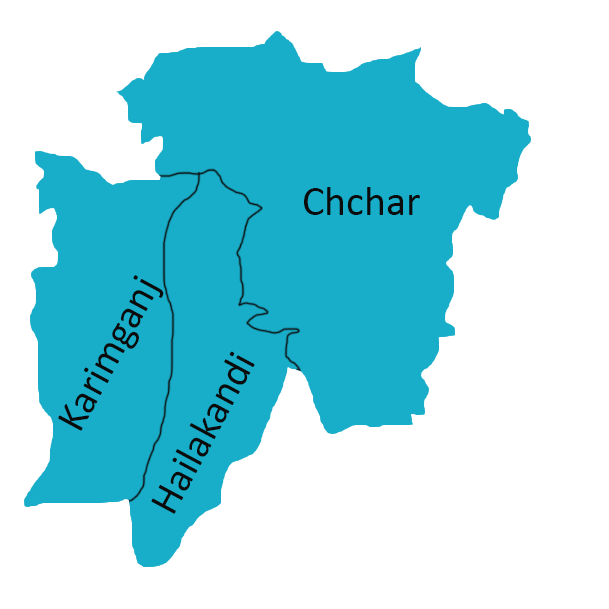
Barak Valley district map

The native Bengali people of Barak Region demanded a separate state for themselves within the Bengali majority areas of Assam, particularly Bengali majority Barak valley, comprising the three districts Cachar, Hailakandi, Karimganj, to meet the criteria for creating a separate state for themselves by carving out from Assam's Assamese majority Brahmaputra valley post NRC. Silchar is the proposed capital of Barak state. Barak valley is the most neglected part of Assam in terms of its infrastructure development, tourism sector, educational institutions, hospitals, IT industries, G.D.P, H.D.I etc. which is still lagging behind in comparison to the Assam's mainland Brahmaputra valley which have access to all of those facilities mentioned above. In fact, the Southern most region of Assam that is Barak Valley have an overwhelming Bengali majority population of about (80.8%) as per 2011 census report respectively.

== Occupation ==
Most high-level positions are dominated by Bengali Hindus; many of the well-known teachers, accountants, engineers, senior officials, and government employees come from the Bengali Hindu community, while a minority are engaged in lower-level jobs.

== Notable people ==
- Priyadarshini Chatterjee, Indian model and beauty pageant titleholder who was crowned Femina Miss India World in 2016. She represented India at the Miss World 2016 pageant. She is the first Indian Bengali women from Dhubri to represent India at Miss World.
- Devoleena Bhattacharjee, Indian actress, born and brought up in Upper Assam.
- Jaya Bhattacharya, Indian television actress born and brought up in Guwahati, Assam.
- Parimal Suklabaidya, Indian politician BJP (MLA) born in Barak valley region of Assam.
- Gautam Roy, Indian politician born in the Indian state of Assam's Barak valley region.
- Sushmita Dev, Indian politician from congress party born and brought up in Assam's Barak Valley region.
- Dipankar Bhattacharjee, Indian badminton player, born and Brought up in Assam.
- Santosh Mohan Dev, Congress political leader and key member of the party was born and brought up in Assam. His family was also belonged to freedom fighter lineage.
- Debojit Saha, Indian playback singer born and brought up in Assam's Barak valley.
- Jaya Seal, Indian actress and dancer, born and brought up in Assam.
- Seema Biswas, Indian film and theatre actress, born and brought up in Assam.
- Amalendu Guha, (30 January 1924 – 7 May 2015) historian, economist, and poet from Assam, India.
- Rumi Nath, Indian politician and was a member of Assam Legislative Assembly.
- Ramkrishna Ghosh, a BJP MLA from Hojai.
- Kalika Prasad Bhattacharya, singer who was born and brought up in Assam's Barak valley.
- Radheshyam Biswas, former member of Lok Sabha), AIUDF, who was born and brought up in Assam's Barak valley.
- Karnendu Bhattacharjee, ex-MP of Rajya Sabha, Indian National Congress
- Rajdeep Roy, Member of Lok Sabha, Silchar
- Kripanath Mallah, Member of Lok Sabha, Karimganj
- Gautam Roy, former Minister, Assam
- Pritam Das, cricketer
- B. B. Bhattacharya, former vice-chancellor, Jawaharlal Nehru University, New Delhi
- Sushmita Dev, Leader, All India Trinamool Congress

== See also ==
- Bengali Hindus
- Bongal Kheda
- D voter
- Bongal
- Bengali Hindu diaspora

== Bibliography ==
- Baruah, Sanjib (29 June 1999). India Against Itself: Assam and the Politics of Nationality. University of Pennsylvania Press. ISBN 978-0-8122-3491-6.
- Cederlöf, Gunnel (2014). Founding an Empire on India's Northeast Frontiers 1790–1840: Climate, Commerce, Polity. New Delhi: Oxford University Press. ISBN 978-0-19-809057-1.
- Shin, Jae-Eun (2020). "Descending from demons, ascending to kshatriyas: Genealogical claims and political process in pre-modern Northeast India, The Chutiyas and the Dimasas". The Indian Economic and Social History Review. 57 (1): 49–75. doi:10.1177/0019464619894134. S2CID 213213265.
