= Anti-Hindi agitations of West Bengal =

Series of protests in the eastern Indian state

- Date: 1980s–present
- Location: Present-day West Bengal, India
- Caused by: Various attempts by the Government of India to promote Hindi language in the state
- Goals: To prevent the imposition of Hindi in the state
- Methods: Conferences, rallying, media activism

Parties
Amra Bangali; Bangla Pokkho; Jatiyo Bangla Sammelan	Government of India

The anti-Hindi agitations of West Bengal is the opposition to Hindi imposition in the eastern Indian state of West Bengal. Movements against Hindi imposition were mainly conducted through social media, road meetings, demonstrations and deputation submissions. Road meetings, protest and deputation submission programs were initially centered in the city of Kolkata or Kolkata metropolitan area but later spread to various divisional cities and district cities of West Bengal. All these movements were organized by organizations like Amra Bangali, Bangla Pokkho and Jatiyo Bangla Sammelan.

Since the end of the second decade of the 21st century, various organizations have organized road meetings and agitations against the use of Hindi or Hindi and English languages except Bengali on the nameplates of various institutions of West Bengal, national highways, Banks and Kolkata Metro.

== History ==
=== 1980s ===
Amra Bangali started a political program in the 1980s to promote the Bengali language. However, the party's activities were mainly confined to the northern part of the West Bengal.

=== Agitations of 2021 ===
The Indian Association for the Cultivation of Science issued a notification to the staffs of institution on 19 March 2021, stating that 55% of written communication in institutions should be done in Hindi. staffs organized protests against imposition of Hindi in university. Students protested by writing 'No Hindi Imposition' on the institution grounds and stood maintaining social distance. But the notification was only for administrative staff.
