= Silapathar massacre =

Massacre of Hindus

Silapathar massacre শিলাপাথর গণহত্যা
- Location: Silapathar, Lakhimpur, Assam, India
- Date: 14 February 1983 (UTC+5:30)
- Target: Bengali Hindus
- Attack type: Massacre
- Weapons: Guns, spears, swords, scythes, bows and arrows
- Perpetrators: Mishing and other native Assamese mobs

Silapathar massacre (Bengali: শিলাপাথর গণহত্যা) refers to the massacre of Bengali Hindu refugee settlers from East Pakistan in Silapathar in undivided Lakhimpur district of Assam in February 1983. Around fifty Bengali Hindus were killed in the massacre. Veteran journalist Sabita Goswami reminisced that according to Government sources, more than a thousand people were killed in the clashes. The Hajongs, another refugee group though not the primary target, suffered casualties. The news of the massacre was reported after several days as the attackers had destroyed several bridges leading to the remote area.

== Background ==
In the 1960s, thousands of Bengali Hindus fled the persecutions in East Pakistan and arrived as refugees in West Bengal, Assam and other north-eastern states of India. In Lakhimpur District of Assam the Bengali Hindu refugees were settled by the central and state governments in Silapathar and other places. In the Silapathar area the villages of Kakobari, Panbari, Arnay Ramnagar, Arnay Tirashi, Kheroni Basti, Simen Sapori and Kanchonkona were inhabited by the Bengali Hindu refugees. The Jairampur village was inhabited by the Hajong refugees. The area now falls under Dhemaji District.

By 1983, the Bengali Hindus had become two decades old residents of Silapathar. They were ethnic minority in the region. They were often extorted of the harvest of the fish catch by the predominant groups in the region.

== Killings ==
The attackers had destroyed several bridges which lead to the remote area. The mobs attacked the villagers with machetes, bows and arrows. The villagers were hacked to death. The attackers burnt the houses, belongings and the food grains. According to eyewitnesses, the attacks snatched the babies from their mothers' arms and threw them into fire. The villagers ran towards the jungle for shelter. They spent days without much food or shelter. The Hajongs were not the direct targets but they were a witness to the massacre of the Bengali Hindus. During the incident their village was also burnt and they took shelter in the refugee camps.

== Aftermath ==
As the attackers set fire to the villages, the survivors fled to Arunachal Pradesh. Later, the government setup some relief camps. The survivors who had been hiding in the jungles till then took shelter in the relief camps. After a few months the government provided the survivors some tin sheets and ration and disbanded the relief camps. The villagers worked hard to rebuild their homes and hearth. However, the government didn't have any long term relief and rehabilitation measures for the victims of the massacre.

== See also ==
- Mandai massacre
- Khoirabari massacre
- North Kamrup massacre
- Goreswar massacre
