= Khoirabari massacre =

Mass killings in India in 1983

- Location: Khoirabari, Darrang district, Assam, India
- Date: 7 February 1983; At night (UTC+5:30)
- Target: Bengali Hindus
- Attack type: Massacre
- Weapons: Guns, spears, swords, scythes, bows and arrows
- Deaths: ~500
- Injuries: 1000–2000
- Perpetrator: Indigenous Assamese mobs

The Khoirabari massacre was an ethnic massacre of an estimated more than 500 immigrant Bengalis in the Khoirabari area of Assam, India, on 7 February 1983. Activists of the Assam Agitation sought to block an assembly election that day and had cut communications to the Bengali enclaves, which were perceived to be pro-election. Indigenous Assamese groups, who held resentments towards the immigrant Bengalis, took advantage of the resulting isolation and surrounded and attacked the Bengali villages at night.

News surrounding the massacre was not reported for two weeks. Journalist Shekhar Gupta reported a top Assam police officer admitting that the Assam police were preoccupied with the exaggerated news of the massacre of the Assamese people in Gohpur and that they failed to take proper action in Khoirabari on time.

== Background ==
Khoirabari was a Bengali Hindu settlement in the Mangaldoi sub-division of the Darrang district, situated about 25 kilometres (16 mi) north of the town Mangaldoi. In 1983, there was an enclave of hundreds of minority Bengali Hindus living in a cluster of villages in the Khoirabari area, surrounded by Indigenous Assamese villages. For years there had been a clash between them and the Assamese community.

== Massacre ==
The first phase of polling of the assembly election was scheduled for 14 February 1983. The activists of the Assam Agitation were opposed to the elections and viewed the non-Assamese community pockets as pro-election. The communication links to the non-Assamese villages were cut. As a result, the Central Reserve Police Force and the polling agents could not be sent to Khoirabari. Taking advantage of the situation, local Assamese mobs surrounded and attacked the isolated Bengali Hindu villages, who were in significant number, at night. According to veteran Assamese journalist Sabita Goswami, the innocent victim Bengali Hindus had taken shelter at the Khoirabari School, where the Assamese mob of adjacent villages attacked them. According to Indian Police Service officer E.M. Rammohun, more than one hundred local Bengali Hindus were killed in the massacre. According to journalist Shekhar Gupta, more than 500 Bengali Hindus were killed. The survivors took shelter in the Khoirabari railway station until the elections were over. After the elections, Prime Minister Indira Gandhi and Assam Chief Minister Hiteshwar Saikia visited the Khoirabari relief camp. Ramakrishna Mission did relief work among the survivors at the camp. They had passed days in fear.

== Aftermath ==
Following the massacre, K. S. Sudarshan and other leaders of the Hindu nationalist group Rashtriya Swayamsevak Sangh (RSS) approached Gupta to understand why so many Bengali Hindus were massacred by the Assamese communities. The RSS leadership considered the Bengali Hindus "unprotected" and did not expect the local Assamese to kill their co-religionists. Gupta explained the ethnic and linguistic fault lines that lay behind the massacre, which were so deep that the perpetrators did not distinguish between Hindus and Muslims. This was the cause of the native sentiment of the original inhabitants the Assamese for their survival under the threat of Bengali-speaking doubtful immigrants whether it be Hindu or Muslim.

In February 2018, the Compensation-demand Committee of Dead People in the Assam Movement took up the cause of the Bengali Hindu victims of the massacres in Khoirabari and Goreswar in 1983. It demanded martyr status for the victims and compensation for the families. Rangiya legislator Bhabesh Kalita acknowledged the massacre and assured that the victims' families would get compensation.

== See also ==
- Silapathar massacre
- North Kamrup massacre
