= Bengali language movements in India =

Campaign to preserve Bengali language and Bengalis culture

Bengali language movement in India
- Part of Anti-Hindi agitations in India, Bengali nationalism
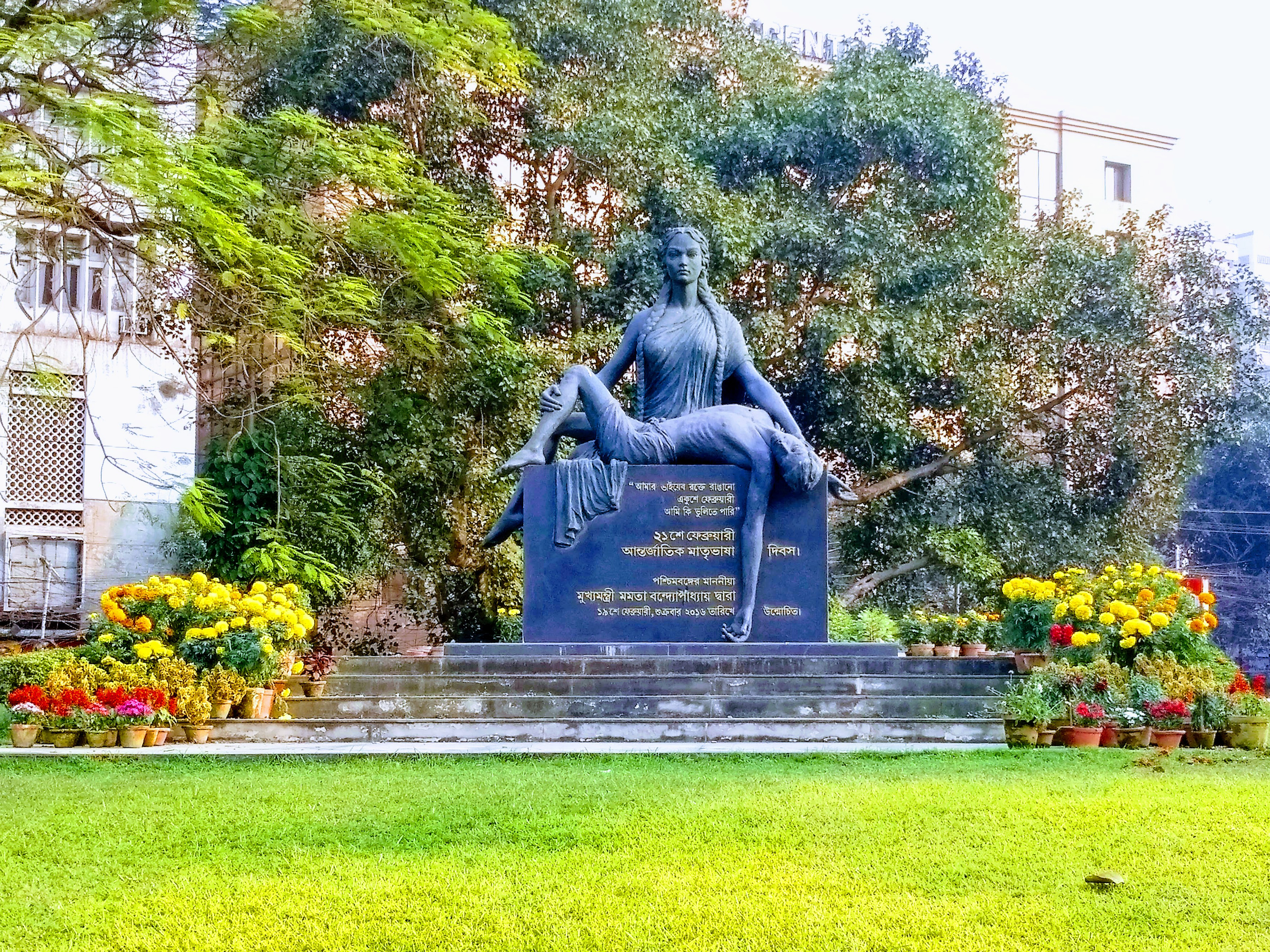
- The Mother Language Day Shahid Minar in Kolkata, West Bengal
- Location: Assam, Bihar, Jharkhand, Delhi states in India
- Caused by: To oppose anti-Bengali sentiment
- Goals: To preserve Bengali language and Bengali culture and in India
- Status: Ongoing in many areas

The Bengali Language Movement is a campaign to preserve Bengali language and Bengali culture and to oppose anti-Bengali sentiment in India. The movement was started in Manbhum in 1940, ahead of the Partition of India which allocated eastern Bengal to the new nation of Pakistan and led to the relocation of many Bengali communities. In 1947 British India bifurcated into India and Pakistan. The population of the eastern part of Bengal was majority Muslim, and was incorporated into Pakistan. Bengali Hindus in this eastern region migrated to India, principally settling in West Bengal, Chhattisgarh, Dandakaranya and Odisha, Maharashtra, Karnataka. The Movement remains prominent in Assam, Jharkhand, Bihar, Chhattisgarh and Karnataka.

== Assam ==
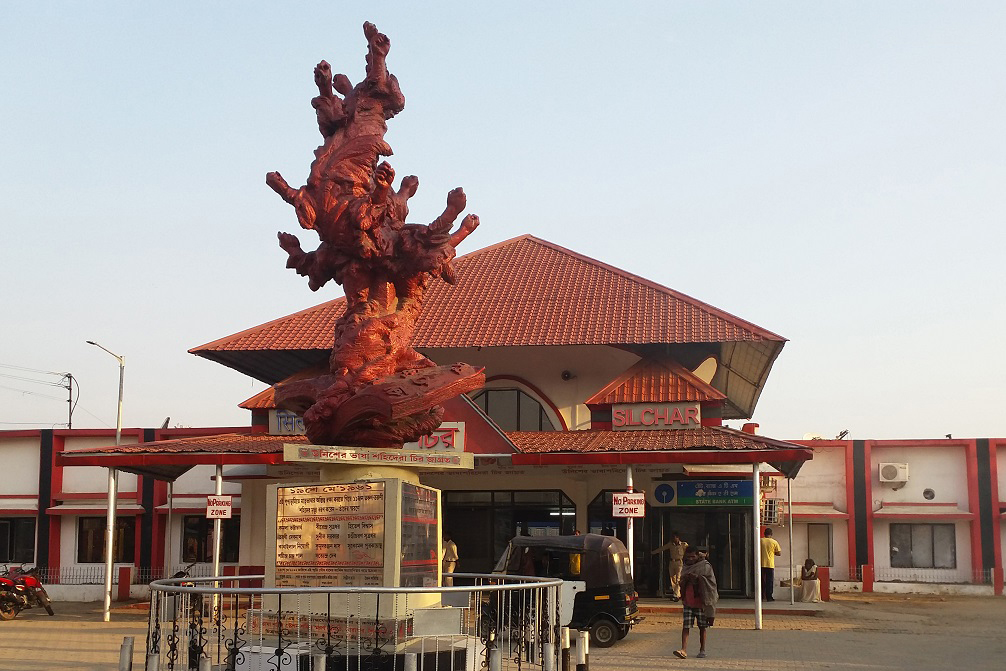
A memorial built on memory of language martyrs at Silchar railway

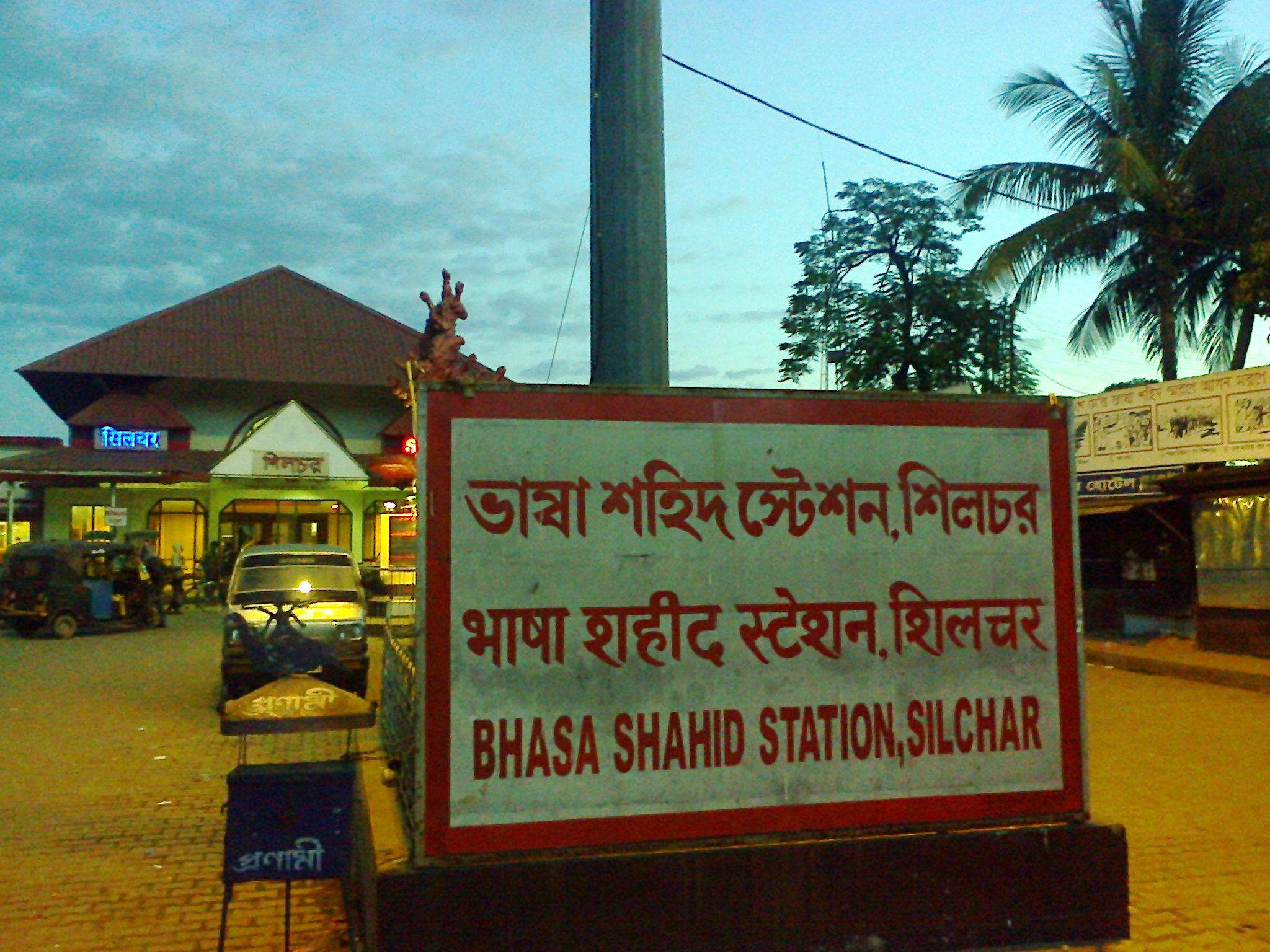
Station Silchar railway station language Known as Shahid Station

The Bengali language movement of Barak Valley in Assam was the protests against the decision of Assamese government making Assamese language as the state's only official language, though majority of the population was the Bengali-speaking in Barak Valley. The main event happened on 19 May 1961. On that day, 11 defendants were killed in provincial police. After that Bengali was declared as the Official Language of the valley and Second Official language of the state.

== Bihar ==
When the Indian government imposed the Hindi language for Bengali speaking people living in Manbhum district of the state of Bihar, they forced the government to form a new district in the state of West Bengal by making this movement for Bangla language.

== Other parts in India ==
=== West Bengal ===
Various movements have been observed in West Bengal to protect Bengali language and culture from Hindi imposition. In 2018, Bengali students protested at Darivit High School, Islampur, North Dinajpur against the imposition of Urdu on Bengalis through the appointment of a Urdu teacher. They demanded the appointment of Bengali teacher to protect Bengali language and culture. During this movement, police shot and killed two Bengali students and injured many others.

=== Jharkhand ===
Jharkhand is not only in the neighboring state of West Bengal but parts of Rarh region of western part of ancient Bengal are included in this particular state. In many districts of this state, the districts were not included in West Bengal despite the Bengali population being the largest. In addition, Bangla and tribes of Bangla Jharkhand (which are called the Definition of Bengali) are the languages connecting However, although Hindi, English and Urdu have the status of the official language of the state, Bengali is still not recognized as the official language. Many Bengali organizations of Jharkhand and tribal organizations have long been demanding to declare Bangla as the official language. Although Bengal was declared the second official language under the pressure of Bengali movement in Jharkhand, it has not been implemented. Apart from Bangla-speaking students, the deprivation has been accepted, Bengali medium schools have been converted through Hindi.

=== Chhattisgarh ===
After the 1947 partition of India, by Dandakaranya Project, the Hindu refugees of East Bengal rehabilitated in 132 villages and 33 villages of Pachanjoore. For them, arrangements primary and secondary education were arranged. However, after the Dandakaranya project Government of Chhattisgarh stopped providing education for Bengalis. Bengali medium schools were converted through Hindi. No Bengali medium books were provided and Bengali educators face discrimination. The students started showing protests. After the formation of movement under the leadership of the All India Bengali Refugees Association demanding Bengali medium schools, Bangla in primary and secondary level and Bangla in government services. The protests were not fruitful. Majority of Bengalis migrated to other states.

=== Delhi ===
During the partition of India in 1947 refugees from East Bengal took refuge in Delhi in the capital of India. At that time, Chittaranjan Park was the main residence in Delhi. Bengali's living in Delhi from last 200 years when Bengal regiment captured Delhi from Maratha in 1803. Bengali's living in Delhi from the time of Mughal when Sultan of Bengal used to do trade. Many Bengali businessman used to come to Delhi and stayed. Many Bengali school which established before independence. Around more than 10 Bengali school's opened before independence and they are N P Bengali Girls Senior Secondary School, Shyama Prasad Vidyalaya, Bidhan Chandra Vidyalaya Senior Secondary School, Union Academy Senior Secondary School, Lady Irwin Senior Secondary School, Raisina Bengali Senior Secondary School, Bengali school J Block Laxmi nagar, Bengali Boys Senior Secondary School, Vinay Nagar Bengali Senior Secondary School, Ramakrishna Sarda Mission Nivedita Vidyamandir and these schools are English medium with Bangla is a mandatory subject. Besides, Bengalis from West Bengal, Tripura, Assam, Jharkhand and other Bengali-speaking states of India came to Delhi, before the Sindhi, Punjabis, and Baniya's.

Bengalis became Delhi's second largest minority community. According to the Indian population, approximately 2.5 million (25 lakhs) Bengali people live in Delhi. But, there too Bengalis acknowledged discrimination. Although there are other languages Nizasub academy in Delhi, there is no Bengali language academy. Bangla Medium School is not available for Bengali Studies in Delhi. Therefore, Bengalis in Delhi are protesting for the rights of language. Attempts at establishing a Bangla Academy in Delhi are currently underway due to the Bengali movement teacher Rajesh Sarkar.

=== Karnataka ===
A section of the refugees of East Bengal took shelter in different villages of the southern state of Karnataka. There was no arrangement for Bangla readers to read Bengali there. Bengali medium and Bengali Bengalis in Karnataka took the movement to accept the language as a text issue. Their demand for movement The Karnataka government arranges for Bengali reading in the Bengali villages of the state. Bengalis In Karnataka, the Government of Karnataka recognized Bengali as the state's second language in the movement.
