= Veer Lachit Sena =

Socio political organization

Veer Lachit Sena, named after legendry General Lachit Borphukan, founded in 2010 and becoming notably active since 2019, is an Assamese nationalistic organization, which tends to fight for indigenous Assamese people people's right and against the domination of outsider communities. The organization is headed by Shrinkhal Chaliha.

== Activities ==
- On August 28, 2022, a local group of the Veer Lachit Sena named Shrinkhal Chaliha threatened Narayan Paul, a Bengali-origin businessman in Sivasagar, with a "hengdang," a traditional sword used by the Ahom kings. Chaliha's threat stemmed from an alleged rent dispute between Paul and an Assamese landlady, despite Paul asserting that the matter was already in court. Undeterred by the possibility of legal repercussions, Chaliha boldly claimed that "jail is my second home," revealing his contempt for the law and escalating the ethnic tensions in the region, where such actions seem increasingly unchecked.
- The actions of the Veer Lachit Sena, particularly the vandalism of Bengali language banners at Durga Puja pandals in the Brahmaputra Valley in October 2023, have sparked controversy over language and cultural tensions in Assam. The group's aggressive stance against the use of Bengali, despite its status as an official language, reflects broader concerns about the imposition of Assamese identity. Their actions, including confrontations with Puja Committee members, have contributed to heightened regional and ethnic divisions.

In May 2023, Shrinkhal Chaliha, a member of Lachit Sena, was involved in a confrontation with a Marwari businessman, reportedly spitting on his face. He was arrested for the incident but later released on bail. Subsequent investigations uncovered his involvement in money laundering activities, leading to further legal scrutiny. Authorities are continuing their probe into Chaliha's criminal connections, with both the initial incident and money laundering charges now under investigation but authorities didn't take strict action against him.

In August 2024, following the circulation of videos, including one featuring Shrinkhal Chaliha of Lachit Sena making racist and venomous remarks against the Marwari community, BJP leader Gaurav Somani filed an FIR against him at Dispur Police Station. However, after receiving threats from both ULFA and Lachit Sena, Somani was compelled to withdraw the FIR.
