= Bangla Pokkho =

- Logo

- Flag of Bangla Pokkho
- Pronunciation: [baŋla pɔkʰːo]
- Formation: 7 January 2018 (8 years ago)
- Founder: Garga Chatterjee
- Legal status: Active
- Purpose: Bengali nationalism in India
- Headquarters: Kolkata, India
- Region served: West Bengal and Tripura
- Products: Bangla Pokkho Barta (Monthly newspaper)
- Members: 200,000–300,000 (2019)
- Official language: Bengali
- Website: www.banglapokkho.com

Bangla Pokkho (pronounced [ˈbaŋla ˈpɔkʰːo]; literally means Side of Bengal or In support of Bengal) is a pro-Bengali advocacy organisation that focuses on rights for Bengalis in India. Based on Bengali nationalism, it works against the enforcement of Hindi in West Bengal. It is organised along linguistic lines and is aimed at protecting Bengali culture. It uses the state slogan "Joy Bangla".

== Demands and protests ==
Bangla Pokkho majorly demands 100% reservation for residents of West Bengal in fields of government jobs and 90% reservation in other job sectors, education, military, and administration works. The group has done numerous meetings, gatherings, and rallies throughout many places of West Bengal and Tripura.

Bangla Pokkho also demanded for Bengali language in various exams i.e. Rail, JEE, NEET etc., and in Banks, offices, and other sectors. The group proposed that the top administrative officials in West Bengal must come from the WBCS/WBPS cadre and not the IAS/IPS.

Bangla Pokkho protested when Bengali workers in WBSEDCL were expelled as they were not fluent in English and Hindi. After protests, the company took them back and enacted them in respective places.

Massive controversy broke out when in the second season of the webseries ‘Abhay’, released on OTT platform Zee5, young Bengali freedom fighter Khudiram Bose was shown as a "criminal" in its second episode. Bangla Pokkho along with many nationalist organisations protested and demanded the show to be banned. The group sent a legal notice to remove the scene. After that Zee5 edited and re-released the show cutting out the Khudiram image.

The group opposed the CAA and NRC, planned by the central government to be implemented in Bengal. Bangla Pokkho said that the BJP unlawfully had passed the laws in the parliament to break the unity of Hindus and Muslims.

The group also protested against the idea of the formation of Gorkhaland. They fired an idol of Subramaniyam Swami who proposed to make a separate state from West Bengal namely Gorkhaland

Bangla Pokkho along with Kanchanpur Nagarik Surakkha Mancha met in a big protest in Tripura, that gathered more than 30,000 Bengalis in Tripura, complaining against social discrimination of Bengalis by the Tripura state BJP Government.

In August 2025, Bangla Pokkho’s founder, Garga Chattopadhyay, was reportedly assaulted inside the Congress state office in Kolkata. He had visited the premises to offer condolences amid a violent clash that occurred earlier that day, when BJP-affiliated activists allegedly attacked the Congress headquarters. According to Chattopadhyay and eyewitness reports, he was then attacked by a group of individuals identified as Congress-affiliated Leaders.

== Major successes ==
- The West Bengal Public Service Commission, which is the body for tests for administrative posts in the Government of West Bengal marked the Bengali language mandatory with 300 marks in Bengali/Nepali language paper in the examination.
- Hindi and English languages were used in Kolkata Metro Rail smart cards. In this regard, the Bangla Pokkho protested and pointed out the non-use of the Bengali language in Bengali-speaking states and the use of Hindi to the exclusion of the Bengali. Bengali language was included in Kolkata Metro Rail smart card after this protest.
- The SET exam, used to recruit college faculties, introduced the Bengali language as a medium.
- Major banks and ATMs started to use the Bengali language in the bank forms, which were previously in Hindi and English only.

== Support and criticism ==
As of January 2019, Bangla Pokkho claims to have 200,000 to 300,000 supporters, who usually have a stand for the promotion and protection of Bengali culture. Bangla Pokkho is known to promote Hindu-Muslim unity among Bengalis. Maidul Islam, political analyst and faculty member of Centre for Studies in Social Sciences, terms this as the rise of the organic nationalist left of center, after the decline of Left and its class politics.

=== Criticisms ===
A political controversy had erupted over a video in which a group of men are purportedly seen assaulting and abusing two job aspirants from Bihar in Siliguri town of West Bengal.The video, which was on social media, showed two youths from Bihar, said to be appearing for recruitment in the central para military forces, being heckled by a group of people and questioned about their domicile. The accused shouted at them, searched their documents and made them do squats holding their ears. “A video was in circulation on social media where two persons claiming them as IB officers were seen assaulting and abusing two other persons in Siliguri. Those two persons have been identified, their claim of being the IB officers is fake and they have been arrested,” the Siliguri Police Commissionerate had posted on X on Thursday (September 26, 2024).The two accused, Rajat Bhattacharya and Giridhari Roy, were produced before a court in Siliguri on Friday and remanded to two days of police custody. While being produced in a court, Mr. Bhattacharya remained unfazed and said that people from other states cannot appear in recruitment drives in West Bengal.

According to some reports, the accused are associated with Bangla Pokkho, a group that claims to promote “Bengali nationalism” and “protect Bengali culture”. Over the past few years, the issue of ‘Bahirgata’ (outsiders) has dominated the State politics and was at the centre of discourse during the 2021 Assembly polls.

Bangla Pokkho has been increasingly accused of exhibiting political bias, particularly in favor of the Trinamool Congress, which has raised concerns about its impartiality and influence on public opinion.

On 12 May 2026, Bangla Pokkho’s founder, Garga Chatterjee, was arrested by the Kolkata Police.
