= D voter =

Disenfranchised voters in Assam, India

D voter, sometimes also referred to as Dubious voter or Doubtful voter is a category of voters in Assam who are disenfranchised by the government on the account of their alleged lack of proper citizenship credentials. The D voters are determined by special tribunals under the Foreigners Act, and the person declared as D voter is not given the elector's photo identity card. In 2011, the Gauhati High Court ordered the D voters to be transferred to Foreigners Tribunals set up under Foreigners Tribunal Order 1964 and be kept in detention camps. The Bengali Muslims and Bengali Hindus who migrated from East Pakistan and Bangladesh before and after 1971 are affected by this categorization. According to Sudip Sarma, the publicity secretary of the Assam unit of the Nikhil Bharat Bangali Udbastu Samanway Samiti, there are 6 lakh Bengali Hindu D voters in the state.

== History ==
On 17 July 1997, the Election Commission of India, issued a circular to the Government of Assam directing it to remove non-citizens from the electoral list. Following that, an intensive revision of electoral rolls began in Assam, involving door to door survey in order to enlist only genuine Indian citizens. The persons who could not provide evidence in favour of their Indian nationality were marked with D in the electoral rolls, to indicate the doubtful or disputed status of their Indian nationality. During the survey, the absentee voters too were marked with D. Around 370,000 persons were thus declared as D voters by the Election Commission of India. The persons marked as D voters were barred from contesting the elections and casting their votes. The Election Commission of India further directed the D voters to be put on trial before the Foreigners Tribunals set up under the Foreigner (Tribunal) Order of 1964. Out of an estimated 370,000, only 199,631 cases were referred to the tribunals for verification. During the initial trials 3,686 persons were found to be foreigners, who names were removed from the electoral rolls.

The trials at the 36 Foreigners Tribunals proceeded at a slow pace. Meanwhile, a section of the Bangladeshi illegal immigrants who were marked as D voters and awaiting the trials became absconding. In view of this, on 4 April 2004, the Gauhati High Court ordered the D voters to be sent to detention camps till their cases were disposed of. Accordingly, the D voters facing trial before the Foreigners Tribunal were sent to the detention camps at Goalpara and Kokrajhar. In 2005, another door to door survey was carried out of the Election Commission. During the survey it was found that a huge number of D voters, who were blacklisted in 1997, could not be traced. The number of D voters was officially revised to 181,619. As of June 2012, there were officially 157,465 D voters in Assam, whose credentials are under verification. On 6 January 2014, the State Government informed the Legislature that there were a total of 143,227 D voters in the state.

== Human rights issues ==
In July 2011, two middle aged ethnic Bengali Hindus, brothers Santosh Shabdakar and Manotosh Shabdakar, D voters from Tempur Paikan under Algapur constituency in Hailakandi district were declared as Bangladeshi citizens by the Foreigners Tribunal. The brothers, rickshaw pullers by profession, were born in Tarapur locality of Silchar in Cachar district. They had exercised their voting rights in the past but were declared as D voters before the 2011 assembly elections. After the verdict, they were arrested by the Hailakandi police who handed them over to BSF in Karimganj. On the midnight of 12 July 2011, the BSF took them to Mahishashan border and pushed them into Bangladesh. Since then the Shabdakar brothers could not be traced.

In March 2012, Assam Accord implementation minister Himanta Biswa Sarma said that the Government of Assam would constitute a committee to look into the cases of Bengali Hindu D voters in the state. The Government of Assam would also ensure that the police doesn't harass the Bengali Hindus in name of being D voters. Even after assurance by the minister, the hunt for D voters continued in the Barak Valley. On 8 June 2012, Arjun Namasudra, an ethnic Bengali Hindu from Cachar District committed suicide after being declared a D voter.

== See also ==
- NRC
- Bengali Hindu refugees
- Illegal immigration in India
