= Racism in Asia =

Racism in Asia is multi-faceted and has roots in events that have happened from centuries ago to the present. Racism in Asia (including some countries that are also considered to be part of the Middle-East) may occur from nation against nation, or within each nation's ethnic groups, or from region against region. The article is organised by countries in alphabetical order.

== Bangladesh ==
In 2015, the ruling Awami League Member of Parliament, Elias Mollah, commented on his trip to the Democratic Republic of the Congo: "Our army has gone there (Africa) to civilise those black people. I am sure they will accomplish the task." He constantly referred to the Congolese as "uncivilized black people" and added "People there are yet to become civilised. They take bath every 15 days. After applying soaps before bath, they do not even use water in a bid to retain the aroma."

== Bhutan ==
In 1991–92, Bhutan is said to have deported between 10,000 and 100,000 ethnic Nepalis (Lhotshampa). The exact number of refugees initially displaced remains contested, with differing accounts from various parties. Tensions arose in part because many residents of the region declined an offer of Bhutanese citizenship from the king and resisted relocation, and there were reports of unrest, including isolated incidents of armed resistance. In response, actions by the state and segments of the population led to the departure of a significant number of people from the area. Beginning in March 2008, this population entered a multiyear resettlement process to third countries, including the United States, Canada, New Zealand, Norway, Denmark, the Netherlands, and Australia. At present, the United States is working towards resettling more than 60,000 of these refugees in the US as a condition of its third country settlement programme.

== Brunei ==
Brunei law provides affirmative action to Bumiputera.

== Cambodia ==
Cambodia has disproportionately targeted ethnic minority groups. These included ethnic Chinese, Vietnamese, Thai, and foreigners who live in Cambodia. Part of this conflict stems from Chinese involvement in Cambodia before the Vietnam War. In the late 1960s, an estimated 425,000 ethnic Chinese lived in Cambodia, but by 1984, as a result of the Khmer Rouge's genocide and emigration, only about 61,400 Chinese remained in the country. The Cham, a Muslim minority group whose members are the descendants of migrants from the old state of Champa, were forced to adopt the Khmer people's language and customs. A Khmer Rouge order stated that henceforth "The Cham nation no longer exists on Kampuchean soil belonging to the Khmers" (U.N. Doc. A.34/569 at 9). Only about half of the Cham survived.

== China ==
Scholars have suggested that the People's Republic of China largely portrays racism as a Western phenomenon which has led to a lack of acknowledgement of racism in its own society. For example, the UN Committee on the Elimination of Racial Discrimination reported in 2018 that Chinese law does not define "racial discrimination" and lacks an anti-racial discrimination law in line with the Paris Principles.

Discrimination against African students has occurred since the arrival of Africans to Chinese universities in the 1960s. A known incident in 1988 featured Chinese students rioting against African students studying in Nanjing. In 2007, police anti-drug crackdowns in Beijing's Sanlitun district were reported to target people from Africa as suspected criminals, though police officials denied targeting any specific racial or ethnic group. According to Foreign Policy, African students have reportedly been subjected to more frequent drug testing than students from other regions. Accordingly, some Chinese vloggers have attempted to change the negative stereotypes in their country regarding Africa, while black expats residing in China have reported a mixture of positive and negative experiences. Reports of racism against Africans in China grew during the COVID-19 pandemic in mainland China. In August 2023, Human Rights Watch reported that racist content against Black people is widespread on the internet in China.

=== Hong Kong ===
With a population of 7.3 million Hong Kong has gained a reputation as an international city, while remaining predominantly Chinese. This multi-culturalism has raised issues of racial and gender discrimination, particularly among the 350,000 ethnic minorities such as Africans, Nepalese, Indians, Indonesians, Pakistanis, Mexicans and Filipinos, who have long established minority communities since the founding days of the former colony or have come to Hong Kong recently to work as domestic workers. For example, Filipino females are sometimes addressed by the derogatory term "Bun Mui" and Filipino males "Bun Jai" (literally Filipino sister and Filipino son, respectively). In 2003, the number of complaints filed with the body handling discrimination issues, the Equal Opportunities Commission increased by 31 percent.

Since the transfer of sovereignty in 1997, there has been greater tension and more conflicts have risen between residents of the PRC (People's Republic of China or the "Mainland") and Hong Kong over a variety of political and socio-economical issues concerning the governance and constitutional autonomy of the territory. The issues partly involve the intrusive policies of the central government and also partly the behaviors of Mainland residents when they travel to Hong Kong. Mainland residents suffered considerable set-backs in the 1960s and 1970s due to catastrophes such as the Great Chinese Famine that resulted from the poor governance of the PRC. However, since the 1990s, the Mainland has had considerable economic growth, and a large number of mainland tourists have visited Hong Kong in recent years. There also have been many reports that visiting Mainland parents let their child defecate or urinate openly in the street in busy shopping districts or in public transports.

Similarly, with the introduction of China's Individual Visit Scheme in 2003, which effectively grants Mainland residents an unlimited entry travel visa to Hong Kong, and following the 2008 Chinese milk scandal and other food safety incidents in China an influx of Mainland residents travel regularly to Hong Kong to buy baby formula and other daily necessities. In the process, this influx caused shortages of supply for Hong Kong parents and escalated rents; it also greatly harmed the commercial diversity of Hong Kong business. Due to the great demand from mainland residents, smugglers organizations have grown rapidly. This deleterious effect on the economy has caused some Hong Kong residents to refer to Mainland residents as "locusts"; they are seen as invaders who swarm into the city and drain its resources.

On the other hand, a race discrimination bill has been demanded by human rights groups for the last 10 years, and the government has been accused of putting the issue on the back burner. Last 3 December 2006 was the first time a drafted bill was proposed at the Legislative Council, and was expected to be passed before the end of 2008. However, the bill was criticized for being "too conservative".

=== Tibet ===
Critics of Chinese rule of Tibet use the phrase Sinicization of Tibet in reference to programs and laws which impose "cultural unity" in Tibetan areas of China, including the Tibet Autonomous Region and the surrounding Tibetan-designated autonomous areas. These efforts are undertaken by China in order to forcefully assimilate Tibetan culture into mainstream Chinese culture. Another term for sinicization is cultural cleansing or genocide, a term which has been used in reference to the results of China's sinicization programs and laws in Tibet by the 14th Dalai Lama and the Central Tibetan Administration.

=== Persecution of Uyghurs in China ===
The Chinese government has persecuted Uyghur people and other ethnic and religious minorities in and around the Xinjiang Uyghur Autonomous Region (XUAR) of the People's Republic of China. Since 2014, the Chinese government, led by the Chinese Communist Party (CCP) during the administration of CCP general secretary Xi Jinping, has pursued policies leading to more than one million Muslims (the majority of them Uyghurs) being held in secretive re-education camps without any legal process in what has become the largest-scale detention of ethnic and religious minorities since the Holocaust. Critics of the policy have described it as the Sinicization of Xinjiang and have called it an ethnocide or cultural genocide, while some governments, activists, independent NGOs, human rights experts, academics, government officials, and the East Turkistan Government-in-Exile have called it a genocide. Uyghur individuals are being relocated to factories within mainland China, where they are exploited as contemporary forms of forced labor.

In particular, critics have highlighted the concentration of Uyghurs in state-sponsored re-education camps, suppression of Uyghur religious practices, political indoctrination, severe ill-treatment, and testimonials of alleged human rights abuses including forced sterilization, contraception, and abortion. Chinese government statistics show that from 2015 to 2018, birth rates in the mostly Uyghur regions of Hotan and Kashgar fell by more than 60%. In the same period, the birth rate of the whole country decreased by 9.69%, from 12.07 to 10.9 per 1,000 people. Chinese authorities acknowledged that birth rates dropped by almost a third in 2018 in Xinjiang, but denied reports of forced sterilization and genocide. Birth rates have continued to plummet in Xinjiang, falling nearly 24% in 2019 alone when compared to just 4.2% nationwide.

=== Discrimination against Mongols ===
The CCP has been accused of sinicization by gradually replacing Mongolian languages with Mandarin Chinese. Critics call it cultural genocide for dismantling people's minority languages and eradicating their minority identities. The implementation of the Mandarin language policy began in Tongliao, because 1 million ethnic Mongols live there making it the most Mongolian-populated area. The 5 million Mongols are less than 20 percent of the population in Inner Mongolia.

== India ==
Racism in India first started during the colonial era, when European colonialists, using prevailing theories of scientific racism, formulated racial differences between Europeans and Indians that included dividing various ethnic groups in India into different "classes". Specific groups were labelled as martial races and were overrepresrented in the British Indian Army, while many Adivasi groups who lost their lands and traditional rights over forests were branded as Criminal Tribes. The first Prime Minister of India, Jawaharlal Nehru, wrote:

We in India have known racialism in all its forms ever since the commencement of British rule. The idea of a master race is inherent in imperialism. India as a nation and Indians as individuals were subjected to insult, humiliation and contemptuous treatment. The English were an imperial race, we were told, with the God-given right to govern us and keep us in subjection; if we protested we were reminded of the 'tiger qualities of an imperial race'.

In recent years, discrimination against people from Northeast India and from South India has been reported. In 2007, the North East Support Centre & Helpline (NESC&H) was started as a separate wing of All India Christian Council. Its stated goal is to increase awareness regarding prejudice and attacks against people from North-East India. Many North-Eastern Indians face discrimination, are refused living accommodations when they travel to urban areas to study and are subjected to racial slurs in reference to the appearance of their eyes. A spokesman for the NESC&H has stated that abuse and harassment of North-Easterners is increasing. Northeast Indians often face racist attacks as their Tibeto-Burmese appearance is often mistaken for being Chinese, which comes in the backdrop of hostile diplomatic relations between China and India. As such, racism against Northeast Indians is considered as an expression of anti-Chinese sentiment in India.

A World Values Survey reported India as the second-least tolerant country in the world, as 43.5% of Indians responded that they would prefer not to have neighbors of a different race. The most recent survey, however, in 2016, conducted by the World Values Survey, found that 25.6% of the people living in India would not want a person of a different race to be their neighbor.

== Indonesia ==
Indonesia is a multi-ethnic country. However, several discriminatory laws against Chinese Indonesians were enacted by the government of Indonesia. In 1959, President Sukarno approved PP 10/1959, which forced Chinese Indonesians to close their businesses in rural areas and to relocate to urban areas. Moreover, political pressures in the 1970s and the 1980s restricted the role of Chinese Indonesians in politics, academics, and the military. As a result, they were constrained professionally to becoming entrepreneurs and professional managers in trade, manufacturing, and banking. In the 1960s, after the alleged communist coup attempt in 1965, there was a strong sentiment against Chinese Indonesians, who were accused of being communist collaborators. In 1998, Indonesia riots over higher food prices and rumors of hoarding by merchants and shopkeepers often degenerated into anti-Chinese attacks. There is also discrimination based on religion and belief across the country, especially between Muslims and Christians, particularly during the Maluku sectarian conflict in the wake of Suharto's deposition.

In 1999, Sambas Regency witnessed bloody riots culminating after long-standing animosity between the native Dayak population and Madurese migrants brought under policy by the New Order era government, hundreds of Madurese bodies were reported to be beheaded in the ensuing onslaught.

Amnesty International has estimated more than 100,000 Papuans, one sixth of the population, have died as a result of violence against West Papuans, and others had specified much higher death tolls. The 1990s saw Indonesia accelerate its Transmigration program under which hundreds of thousands of migrants from Java and Sumatra were resettled to Papua over a ten-year period. The Indonesian government saw that as the improvement of the economy and also the population density in Indonesia. Critics suspect that the program's purpose is to tip the balance of the province's population from the heavily-Melanesian Papuans toward western Indonesians to consolidate Indonesian control further. Papuans have also endured racism from other Indonesians outside the island particularly the Javanese for their skin colour and hair who are often insulted as ketek or "monkeys". The 2019 protests in Papua was in response to racial attacks hurled by Indonesian nationalists and Islamists towards Papuan students at a Surabayan university.

== Israel ==
Organizations such as Amnesty International, the Association for Civil Rights in Israel, and the United States Department of State have published reports documenting racial discrimination in Israel.

The Association for Civil Rights in Israel (ACRI) published reports documenting racism in Israel, and the 2007 report suggested that racism in the country was increasing. One analysis of the report summarized it: "Over two-thirds Israeli teen believe Arabs to be less intelligent, uncultured and violent. Over a third of Israeli teens fear Arabs all together....The report becomes even grimmer, citing the ACRI's racism poll, taken in March 2007, in which 50% of Israelis taking part said they would not live in the same building as Arabs, will not befriend, or let their children befriend Arabs and would not let Arabs into their homes." The 2008 report from ACRI says the trend of increasing racism is continuing.

== Japan ==
In 2005, a United Nations report expressed concerns about racism in Japan and that government recognition of the depth of the problem was not total. The author of the report, Doudou Diène (Special Rapporteur of the UN Commission on Human Rights), concluded after a nine-day investigation that racial discrimination and xenophobia in Japan primarily affects three groups: national minorities, Latin Americans of Japanese descent, mainly Japanese Brazilians, and foreigners from poor countries.

Japan only accepted 16 refugees in 1999, while the United States took in 85,010 for resettlement, according to the UNHCR. New Zealand, which is 30 times smaller than Japan (in terms of population), accepted 1,140 refugees in 1999. Just 305 persons were recognized as refugees by Japan from 1981, when Japan ratified the U.N. Convention Relating to the Status of Refugees, to 2002. Former Prime Minister Taro Aso called Japan a "one race" nation. A 2019 Ipsos poll has also suggested that Japanese respondents had a lower sympathy for refugees compared to the other surveyed nations.

Ainu people are an ethnic group indigenous to Hokkaidō, northern Honshū, the Kuril Islands, much of Sakhalin, and the southernmost third of the Kamchatka peninsula. As Japanese settlement expanded, the Ainu were pushed northward, until by the Meiji period they were confined by the government to a small area in Hokkaidō, in a manner similar to the placing of Native Americans on reservations.

=== Lack of anti-discriminatory laws ===
Japan lacks any law which prohibits racial, ethnic, or religious discrimination, or discrimination based on sexual orientation or gender identity. The country also has no national human rights institutions. Non-Japanese individuals in Japan often face human rights violations that Japanese citizens may not. In recent years, non-Japanese media has reported that Japanese firms frequently confiscate the passports of guest workers in Japan, particularly unskilled laborers. Critics call this practice, which is legal and encouraged in Japan, coercive and a form of human trafficking.

=== Forced assimilation of Ainu and Ryukyuans ===
In the early 20th century, driven by an ideology of Japanese nationalism under the guise of national unity, the Japanese government identified and forcefully assimilated marginalized populations, which included Ryukyuans, Ainu, and other underrepresented groups, imposing assimilation programs in language, culture and religion. Japan considers these ethnic groups as a mere "subgroup" of the Japanese people and therefore synonymous to the Yamato people, and do not recognize them as a minority group with a distinct culture.

== Malaysia ==
Malaysia is a multi–ethnic country, with Malays making up the majority—close to 52% of the population. About 30% of the population are Chinese Malaysians (Malaysians of Chinese descent), and Indian Malaysians (Malaysians of Indian descent) comprise about 10% of the population. Government policies of positive discrimination often favor the Malay majority with Bumiputera status, particularly in areas such as housing, finance and education. Such policies are protected by article 153 of the Constitution of Malaysia. The former long-term ruling party of UMNO also promoted Ketuanan Melayu: the idea that the Bumiputeras should get special privileges in Malaysia. It was written into The Federation of Malaya Agreement signed on 21 January 1948 at King House by the Malay rulers and by Sir Edward Gent, as the representative of the British government, that Malays would lead the three main races. Malays dominate in: politics at both national and state levels; the civil service; military and security forces. Chinese have traditionally dominated the economy and live in large numbers in urban areas of Malaysia.

For Ramadan 2011, Chinese-language television station 8TV had some advertisements featuring a Chinese woman at a Ramadan bazaar. The condescending advertisements were pulled for being racist following an online uproar, and the station was expected to apologize. Instead, they claimed the Ramadan advertisements were an "honest mistake" and went on to claim that the viewers misunderstood the clips. The Ramadan advertisements – released as public service announcements (PSA) – appeared to be stereotyping Chinese people, depicting a socially inept Chinese woman embarrassing others at a Ramadan bazaar. Some parts of the community claimed that they were "Islamophobic", especially among the Chinese in Malaysia. Quoting Austrian philosopher Karl Popper, the station said in its Facebook note: "It is impossible to speak in such a way that you cannot be misunderstood." The PSAs highlighted the clueless behaviour of a Chinese woman played by an actor in scenes to demonstrate what might embarrass Muslim Malay hawkers and bazaar patrons alike. In one instance, the Chinese woman dressed in a sleeveless singlet, showing her armpits censored by pixels, to passers-by while touching a bunch of bananas. Each PSA was soon followed by a message on public behavior. One of them included "Do not be greedy and eat in public".

In the 2010–2014 World Values Survey, 59.7% of Malaysian respondents indicated that they would not want immigrants or foreign workers as neighbors, which was among the highest out of the countries surveyed.

In the 2020 survey by IndexMundi, Malaysia ranked second in the proportion of the population recognizing a racism issue in their country.

=== Ketuanan Melayu ===
The Malaysian government ensures that all Bumiputeras are given preferential treatment when it comes to the number of students placed in government universities. The Education Ministry's matriculation programme allocates 90% for Bumiputeras and 10% for non-Bumiputera students.

Bumiputeras are also given 7% discounts for new houses they purchase, and special Malay status reserved land in most housing settlements. Burial plots in most urban areas are for deceased Bumiputeras, while the rest have to be cremated at such locations. All key government positions are to be held by Malays, including most sporting associations. Other forms of preferential treatment include the requirement of a minimum of a 30% Malay Bumiputera equity to be held in Listed Companies, full funding for mosques and Islamic places of worship (Islam is an official religion in Malaysia), special high earning interest trust funds for Bumiputeras, special share allocation for new share applications for Bumiputeras, and making the Malay language a compulsory examination paper to pass with a high emphasis given to it.

Even school textbooks have been criticized as racist, especially from Chinese and Indian-type schools who adopted learning methods from their respective countries. "Interlok" is a 1971 Malay language novel written by Malaysian national laureate Abdullah Hussain, with Chinese groups today condemning its depiction of Chinese characters as greedy, opium-smoking lechers keen to exploit Malays for profit. Some folks said that the Chinese were trying to "conquer Malaysia" as "they did with Singapore". The Indian community earlier complained over the novel's use of the word "pariah" and "keling". Chinese associations said the book was not only offensive to Indians but Chinese as well, as it depicted the character Kim Lock as a "miserly opium addict and callous adulterer" and his son, Cing Huat, as "cunning, greedy, unscrupulous and someone who would sell his daughters". "Interlok" was written based on the ideology of Ketuanan Melayu. The groups also condemned the "major thread" in the book, which depicts the Chinese "cheating and oppressing" Malays or as "nasty and immoral" communist guerrillas.

=== ICERD ===
Malaysia is also one of the only few countries (less than 10) in the world not to ratify the International Convention on the Elimination of All Forms of Racial Discrimination (ICERD) at the United Nations (UN), due to the possibility of "conflicts" with the Constitution of Malaysia and the "race and religious norms" that may jeopardize the special status of Malays in the country.

When BN lost its majority after the country's 2018 Malaysian general election there were fears among the Malay population of eventual ratification by the Pakatan Harapan (PH) coalition, which could possibly signal the end of Bumiputera privileges and special positions of the Malays in the country. Race relations eventually severely deteriorated to the point where a mass rally was held in the country's capital of Kuala Lumpur to pressure the government against ratification.

== Myanmar ==
Ne Win's rise to power in the 1962 military coup and his persecution of "resident aliens" (groups of immigrants whose members were not recognized as citizens of the Union of Burma) led to an exodus of some 300,000 Burmese Indians and Burmese Chinese who were victims of Ne Win's discriminatory policies, particularly after the wholesale nationalization of private enterprise in 1964. Some Muslim refugees who entered Bangladesh also suffer there because the Bangladeshi government provided no support to them as of 2007.

By 2025, over 1 million Rohingya from Myanmar fled to Bangladesh alone, and more have fled to other countries. According to the Refugee Relief and Repatriation Commission, about 624,000 Rohingyas entered Bangladesh until November 7, 2017.

== Nepal ==
In Nepal, there are concerns about racism towards Dalits, indigenous, refugees, and other ethnic communities.

== Pakistan ==
Racist sentiments exist between citizens of Pakistan towards the citizens of Bangladesh. A strong anti-Bengali Pakistani regime prior to and during the Bangladesh Liberation War were strongly motivated by anti-Bengali racism within the establishment, especially against the Bengali Hindu minority. This conflict goes back to when the British Indian Empire into West Pakistan and East Bengal when citizens of today's Pakistan dominated the ununited wings. The ruling class of West Pakistan held political power over and looked down on Bengali Muslims from East Pakistan due to the influence of colonialism a colorist obsession for light skin led to viewing East Pakistanis as darker skinned compared to West Pakistanis. Between 300,000 and 3 million people were killed during the 9-month-long conflict in 1971. The Government of Bangladesh demands a formal apology for those atrocities from the Pakistani head of state, as well as putting on trial former military and political leaders who had played a role in the army action in then East Pakistan. Pakistan has continued to ignore this demand.

Discrimination in Pakistan now is mainly based on religion, social status and gender.

== Philippines ==
Polls have shown that some Christian Filipinos hold negative views directed against the Muslim Moro population due to perceptions of endorsing Islamic terrorism.

The status of Filipinos of Chinese descent varied throughout the colonial period. It is accepted generally, though, that repressive treatment toward Chinese was practised by both Filipinos and Spaniards together with Japanese immigrants and Americans during the colonial period. After independence in 1946, Chinese quickly assumed some of the top posts in finance and business. There were several setbacks, however, such as immigration policies deemed unfair toward migrants from China during President Ramon Magsaysay's term, as well as the limiting of hours for studying Chinese subjects in Chinese schools throughout the country, as promulgated by President Ferdinand Marcos.

In some ways, the Philippines is a surprisingly homogeneous society considering its multiplicity of languages, ethnicities and cultures.

== Singapore ==
Since self-rule and later independence, Singapore has declared itself to be a multi-cultural society. The Singapore National Pledge is a declaration of anti-racism and the acceptance of all races and religions. Racial Harmony Day is celebrated in Singapore to mark the progress made since the 1964 race riots in Singapore. However, there have been particular lows in certain areas during Singapore's early years factored by complex intertwining regional geopolitics: leaders of its Armed Forces during the 1960s were highly suspicious of their native Malay population despite making up the majority of their contemporary personnel under assumed prejudices that said population "could not be trusted" and would mutiny against the state towards neighbouring Indonesia and especially Malaysia (in the aftermath of the separation from the latter Federation) with similar ethnic compositions; Malays were virtually excluded from conscription from the beginning of the draft in 1967 until 1977.

There is a tendency towards collective cultural identity; that is a tendency to focus on group dynamics more at a societal than individual level. This in turn leads to an increased emphasis on being part of the 'in' group and not part of the 'other'. Many have on their identity document an ethnic classification of Other, although there have been recent reforms in 2011 that allow for double-barrel ethnic identifications like "Indian Chinese" or "Chinese Indian" for individuals of mixed heritage.

However, there have been cases of racism including the social stigma attached to intermarriage of different ethnic groups. Such racist sentiments have also not escaped those in power. In 1992, former People's Action Party Member of Parliament Choo Wee Khiang said: "One evening, I drove to Little India and it was pitch dark but not because there was no light, but because there were too many Indians around."

Since 2010, anti-foreigner sentiments have been significant with house-owners and landlords refusing to rent properties to people from China and India. A 2019 YouGov poll has revealed similar results, with Singaporean respondents showing the highest percentage of bias against mainland Chinese and Indian travelers out of all the nations surveyed.

In January 2019, a 30-year-old man was arrested following a vandalism incident in which hateful slurs against the Malay community were scrawled on poles just outside Aljunied MRT station, Geylang which is near a primary and secondary school. The racial slurs contained words like: "Malay mati" (death to Malays) and other slurs displaying graphic sexual acts and one seemed to refer to Malaysian politician Anwar Ibrahim, although it is not independently verifiable if it actually did refer to Anwar.

In July 2019, A 47-year-old man was sentenced to four weeks' jail and issued a S$1,000 fine for a number of offences including subjecting a lift passenger of Indian origin to racist remarks. In June 2020, a mother and son were being investigated for using racist terminology in breach of racial harmony, when referring to people of African origin during an Instagram video. Another form of racism in Singapore is rental discrimination, in which people of certain races are refused tenancy. This practice has become increasingly prevalent in recent years due to the limited supply of housing in Singapore.

In 2019, a 'brownface' advert featuring Dennis Chew in multiple racial attire with make up applied to exaggerate various racial features. This advertisement triggered a rap video in response which not only brought attention to the casual racism that minorities face in day-to-day life, but also attracted the attention of the authorities to the video creators. Chew eventually apologized for his actions, with the broadcaster Mediacorp also dropping the advertisement. Prior to this advertisement, it raised the question on whether the acceptance of 'brownface' should be continued.

However, foreigners have also engaged in expressing racist ideas against Singaporeans. There have also been incidents by foreigners who have been accused of being discriminatory to locals and has generated a lot of negative publicity over comments made about locals. In the case of British banker Anton Casey, he had posted comments on Facebook in 2014 which had abused, variously, a taxi driver and Singaporean commuters in general. For Filipino nurse Ello Ed Mundsel Bello, in 2015 he suggested that Singaporeans could not compete with Filipinos. Sonny Truyen, an Australian of Vietnamese origin, in his exasperation that Pokémon Go was not available in Singapore at the time, made condescending remarks about Singapore, calling it a "shit country with shit people". In 2026, the Singaporean government ordered several social media platforms to block anti-Indian posts that originated from a company in China.

== South Korea ==
Some South Korean schools have been criticized for preferentially hiring white teachers who apply to teach English, due to perceptions that white teachers are more "Western" and therefore have better English skills.

South Korea lacks an anti-discrimination law, which was recommended by the UN Human Rights Committee in 2015. The law has been reported stalled due to "lack of public consensus".

=== Treatment of non-Koreans ===
Due to the lack of an anti-discrimination law, it is common for people not of Korean ethnicity to be denied service at business establishments or in taxis without consequences.

According to a survey conducted by the National Human Rights Commission of Korea among foreign residents in South Korea in 2019, 68.4% of respondents declared they had experienced racial discrimination, and many of them said they experienced it due to their Korean language skills (62.3%), because they were not Korean (59.7%), or due to their race (44.7%).

In 2009, assistant professor Paul Jambor at Korea University claimed that Korean college students exhibit discrimination towards non-Korean professors by calling them by their first names and not showing the same amount of respect towards them as students traditionally show towards their Korean professors. He also added that such outright discrimination at South Korean universities is the reason why they are not highly ranked or seen as prestigious in Asia and beyond.

With South Korean society's passion for education, South Koreans can hold a stereotypical view of Jews as the model of academic excellence as well as Jews being very intelligent. Conversely, a survey by the Anti-Defamation League found that 53% of South Koreans show anti-semitic tendencies. However, the half-Jewish journalist Dave Hazzan investigated on this result and found very little anti-semitism in South Korea. Moreover, Abe Foxman, head of the Anti-Defamation League, admitted that cultural norms affected the respondents' answers which has to be considered in future surveys.

== Taiwan ==
The Taiwanese nationality law has been criticized for its methods of determining which immigrants get citizenship, depending on their ethnic origin. Even so, immigrants already in Taiwan also report being treated as second-class citizens, and that the state should implement anti-discrimination laws.

== Vietnam ==
The Sino-Vietnamese War resulted in the discrimination and consequent migration of Vietnam's ethnic Chinese. Many of these people fled as "boat people". In 1978–79, some 450,000 ethnic Chinese left Vietnam by boat as refugees (many officially encouraged and assisted) or were expelled across the land border with China. There has also been racism from the Kinh Vietnamese majority towards minority groups, including Chinese, Khmers, Thai, Montagnards, Eurasians, black people, etc.

== Regional racism ==
A topic not often discussed is the racism between regions of Asia. For instance, specific regions may be looked down upon or are subjected to discrimination and racism due to perceived differences caused by development indexes that are in part due to economic and political differences, most notably, between developed nations (Japan, South Korea, Singapore, Taiwan, etc.), often seen to be in East Asia, towards developing regions, such as countries comprised in Southeast Asia or South Asia, even though groups of people can be close in racial and sometimes cultural terms. These may also include discriminating based on government forms, such as those in democracies vs those currently still communist. Terms such as "Fancy Asians" (or pale, white skin Asians, primarily East Asians) vs "Jungle Asians" (or brown Asians) exacerbate this divide.

Southeast Asians typically do not fit in the model minority myth as many countries are not as developed and immigrants from Southeast Asia were first experienced as waves of immigrants as refugees from wars such as the Indochina War or Vietnam War, leading to more discriminatory efforts regionally towards Southeast Asia and a perception that Southeast Asians were "brown skin" or "Jungle Asians" and that East Asians were "white skin" or "fancy Asians".

== See also ==
- Fascism in Asia
- Geography of antisemitism
- Islamophobia
- Persecution of Muslims
- Persecution of Hindus
- Persecution of Buddhists
- Index of racism-related articles
- Racism by country
