= Champaknagar =

- town
- Location within Tripura Location within India
- Coordinates: 23°48′14″N 91°29′24″E
- Country: India
- State: Tripura
- District: West Tripura

Population
  - Total: 20k+

Languages
  - Official: Bengali, Kokborok, English
- Time zone: UTC+5:30 (IST)
- PIN: 799045
- Telephone code: 91-0381
- Vehicle registration: TR 01
- Website: tripura.gov.in

Champaknagar is a small town some 30 km away from Agartala, the State capital of Tripur, India on the banks of river Saidra.

== Education ==
- Champaknagar H.S School
- Tripura Loka Sikshalaya High School
- Montfort Higher Secondary School

== Market ==
- Champaknagar Bazar

== Hospital ==
- Champaknagar Primary Health Center
