= North Kamrup violence =

Series of violent activities in Assam, 1980

- Location: North Kamrup, Assam, India
- Date: 3 January 1980 (UTC+5:30)
- Target: pro- and anti- Assam Movement
- Attack type: Group clash
- Weapons: Guns, spears, swords, and scythes.
- Perpetrator: Assamese/Immigrant villagers

The North Kamrup violence was a series of violent incidents in North Kamrup, Assam, on 4–5 January 1980 between those who supported the Assam Movement and those who opposed it. Triggered by the death of a high school student, a member of the AASU, it led to a series of attacks and counter-attacks between Assamese and immigrant villages leading to a curfew.

According to the Citizenship Rights Preservation Committee, representing Bengali-speaking people, the violence was directed against linguistic, religio-linguistic, ethnic minorities and members of the CPI, CPI(M) and CPI(ML) political parties who opposed the Assam Movement. Many of the victims were Miya and it is alleged that the Army committed atrocities on Assamese villagers during the curfew. This was the first reported large-scale group clash during the Assam Movement.

== Background ==
In some districts of lower Assam, Bengali Hindus have experienced violence directed against on the linguistic and cultural identity of the Assamese people. Bengali speaking people were often harassed as foreigners and became the target of violence during the anti-Bengali movement in Assam.

At the beginning of the movement, many Muslim students of East Bengali origin supported and joined the movement as Assamese speakers (see Na Asamiya). (Note: The term Na-Asamiya in Assamese language literally means new Assamese, the prefix Na- means new and Asamiya means Assamese. After the Partition of India, the group gave up its Bengali linguistic identity and adopted the Assamese language. Gradually they adopted Assamese culture. In English, they are sometimes referred to as Neo-Assamese. Na-Asamiyas also referred to as Charua Musalman, literally meaning Muslims of the chars, because of their preference in settling in the chars.) Eventually, many began to reclaim their Muslim and Bengali identity.

== Violence and victimisation ==
According to one version, on 3 January 1980, a group of students of Baganpara High School were attacked while visiting Barikadanga to supervise a three-day strike in response to a call given by the AASU for supporting the anti-Bengali movement. According to another version, the students went there to raise money for the anti-Bengali movement.

== Read also ==
- Bongal Kheda
- Goreswar massacre
- Mandai massacre
