= Mandai massacre =

1980 killing of Bengalis in Tripura, India

- Part of the insurgency in Tripura
- Location of massacre
- Location: 23.86°N 91.48°E; Mandai, West Tripura, Tripura, India
- Date: 8 June 1980 (UTC+5:30)
- Target: Bengalis
- Attack type: Massacre
- Weapons: Guns, spears, swords, scythes, bows and arrows
- Deaths: 350–400
- Perpetrator: Tripuri insurgents

The Mandai massacre refers to the general massacre of the Bengalis of Mandai village near the capital (Agartala) of the Indian state of Tripura on 8 June 1980. According to official figures, 255 Bengalis were massacred in Mandai, while foreign presses, independent sources and eyewitnesses put the figure anywhere between 350 and 400. Many of the victims had their heads crushed and their limbs severed. The children were spiked through. Pregnant women had their stomachs slit open. The Amrita Bazar Patrika described the Mandai massacre as worse than the My Lai massacre.

== Background ==
Before the massacre, Mandai was an obscure village located about 30 km northeast of Agartala. The name of the village was incorrectly spelled as Mandwi in the land records. The village is inhabited by mostly Tripuri and the Bengali minority are either shopkeepers or running other businesses.

The demographic and ethnic imbalances and economic tensions in Tripura were spawned by the influx of Bengali Hindu settlers from Muslim East Pakistan (now Bangladesh) after Partition. The Mandai massacre saw between at least 350 and 400 Bengalis killed in one night on 5 June 1980 and followed by unprecedented ethnic riots in which more than 1000 people, mostly Bengalis, were killed. More than 6,000 others died in violence perpetrated by different rebel groups during the early 21st century. More than 500 people were kidnapped and released for huge ransoms and hundreds have been declared missing. Many Bengalis left Mandai but the area continued to be plagued by insurgency until 2009.

In 2003, Subir Bhaumik, wrote "Post-partition Tripura, therefore, after five long decades remains a hotbed of violent political action where the ruling hammer and sickle is being challenged by tribal insurgency led by the natives, saffron nationalism and Bengali subnationalism both led by migrants."

== Mass violence and refugee crisis ==
On the night of 6 June, insurgents followed a blueprint of mass destruction. Armed insurgents began cordoning off the nontribal localities. The following morning, news of arson, violence and murder began to spread. The Bengalis who stayed deep in the tribal pockets fled for their safety; thousands took shelter near the National Highway 44. The BDO of Jirania, had opened a relief camp at Khayerpur School and started administering initial relief to the Bengali refugees. Shankar Narayan, the District Magistrate of West Tripura was informed by that time and he asked BDO of Jirania to provide for the refugees. In the evening there were reports of large-scale arson and looting. in Jirania block. Army units, however, were given orders to flag march only. Reports from Champaknagar were grave and rioters were committing arson in Bengali villages in the foothills of Baramura. On 8 June, at 3:00 a.m., Satyendra Chakraborty, the LAMPS manager of Mandai, and Sachindra Saha, a CPI(M) leader, reported at the B.D.O. office that more than 500 Bengalis in Mandai have been cordoned off and the armed Tripuris are about to kill them. Many Bengalis had taken shelter at the police outpost in Mandai, which remained unmanned.

== Relief operations and government inquiry ==
At 6:00 a.m., a contingent of the Rajasthan Armed Constabulary and a platoon of Tripura Armed Police proceeded towards Mandai from Jirania. On their way, they found an entire village burning in Purba Noabadi. After dousing the flames, they proceeded. By the time they reached Mandai all the houses and huts were reduced to ashes, except the LAMPS building. After two hours, the injured were sent to GB hospital in a truck. Those who survived were given shelter across different schools of Agartala. Those events followed by curfews existing several months throughout the state.

On 8 July 1980, the Ministry of Home Affairs set up the Dinesh Singh Committee to investigate the massacre.
