= Hindi imposition =

Forced usage of Hindi in India

Hindi imposition is a linguistic propagation in which the use of Modern Standard Hindi is preferred in Indian states that do not use or desire to use Hindi as a regional language. The term is rooted in the anti-Hindi agitations of Tamil Nadu, where it was proposed for Hindi to be taught in schools in the Madras Presidency.

The idea of modern Hindi imposition developed from Hindi and English being designated as an official language of the Indian Republic, with a motion to replace English with Hindi within 15 years of its designation – which has not happened.

== Background ==
Hindi and Non-Hindi speaking region of India, 2011 census

Hindi speaking states

Hindi (including its verity, as per census grouping) speaking district

Self-reported Hindi speaking district

In India in 1951, there were around 1,652 languages used as a mother tongue, with 87% of the country's population of approximately 450 million speaking one of 14 different languages. The most popular was Hindi, spoken by around 30% of India's population. Jawaharlal Nehru – the prime minister of India at the time – viewed a lingua franca as necessary due to the diversity of languages. He suggested that the Hindustani language (Hindi–Urdu) was the best option, as it was easy-to-learn, was already spoken by a plurality of the population, and was thought to forge unity between Hindu and Muslim communities – whereas English would not be a viable due to the difficulties in educating a foreign language to millions of people. The Constitution of India, therefore, designated Hindi and English as co-official languages, with the latter being phased out within 15 years.

The Constitution of India also states that efforts should be undertaken to promote the use of Hindi – where the three-language formula was suggested. In this format, a student's first language would be their own mother tongue, the second language would be Hindi, and the third language would be English. This was described as an educational burden where Hindi speakers would only have to learn two languages, whereas others would have to learn three, or possibly four languages if one's mother tongue was not the state's official language. Nehru also suggested that efforts should be made to simplify the amount of languages spoken by absorbing variants of Hindi into a single language, and creating one script for Kannada, Malayalam, Tamil and Telugu. In recent developments, Union Home Minister Amit Shah announced a decision to make Hindi compulsory in all eight northeastern states up to Class 10. This decision was communicated during the 37th meeting of the Parliamentary Official Language Committee held in New Delhi. Shah emphasized the importance of Hindi as "the language of India" and advocated for its wider acceptance as an alternative to English, particularly for inter-state communication. According to Shah, the move aims to integrate Hindi more closely into the fabric of national unity. To support this initiative, Shah noted the recruitment of 22,000 Hindi teachers across the northeastern states and highlighted the efforts of nine tribal communities in adopting Devanagari script for their dialects' scripts.

However, the proposal has faced staunch opposition in the Northeastern region. Critics argue that the imposition of Hindi undermines the linguistic diversity and cultural identities of the region. They emphasize the importance of preserving and promoting local languages, which hold significant cultural and historical relevance for indigenous communities. This opposition reflects a historical context of linguistic tensions in India, exemplified by events such as the Anti-Hindi agitations of Tamil Nadu. Such protests have influenced language policies in the country, highlighting the complexities of language politics and the need for inclusive language policies that respect linguistic diversity.

As per Duncan B. Forrester's study on the Madras Anti-Hindi Agitation in 1965, political protests have had significant effects on language policy in India. The agitation brought attention to the importance of considering linguistic diversity and community sentiments in formulating language policies.

== Arguments ==
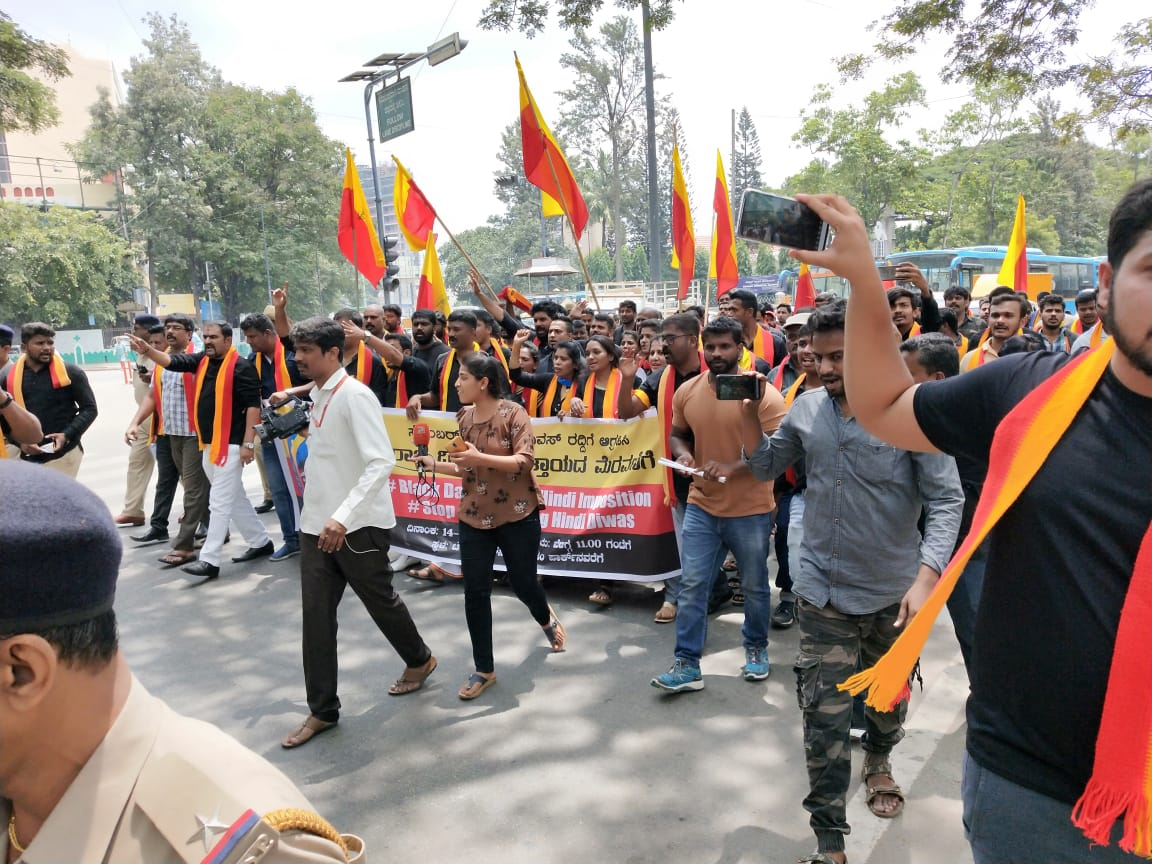
Marchers protest celebrations of Hindi Day, on 14 September 2019 in Bengaluru, Karnataka.

Modern Hindi imposition has been used as a political tool, with many supporting the use of Hindi as a sole language of India with various arguments, while others oppose this action. The term One Nation, One Language has repeatedly been used to justify the imposition of Hindi. Hindu nationalists have used the phrase "Hindi-Hindu-Hindustan", (mimicking the Urdu-Muslim-Pakistan model arising out of Urdu language's association with Islam in the eyes of Hindus following the Hindi-Urdu controversy and status as the national language of Pakistan) and are in favour of imposing a Sanskritised Hindi stripped of Perso-Arabic and Turko-Mongol loanwords.

=== Uniformity ===
It has been suggested that the use of Hindi as a national language can unite its population, and can be used as an official medium of communication within India. People from the southern states have stated that it is redundant to use two different languages as official languages, when only one can be used instead.

=== Counterarguments against Uniformity ===
The issue of language imposition in India has been a subject of significant debate and contention, particularly in relation to the promotion of Hindi as a unifying language. Various studies and analyses have shed light on the complexities surrounding this issue.

In a study by John J. Vater and Ronojoy Sen, published in 2019, titled "The Three Language Formula Revisited: 'Hindi Imposition' Stokes Protests," the authors discuss the release of the 2019 Draft National Education Policy, which recommended compulsory learning of Hindi in non-Hindi speaking states. This move was met with objections, particularly in South India, where it was perceived as an act of 'Hindi imposition.' The study highlights the controversy surrounding this issue and the broader implications for linguistic diversity and cultural identity in India.

Furthermore, a paper by Luke Rimmo Lego, titled "Language Enforcement in India: Prejudice or Nationalism," explores the historical context and consequences of India's pursuit of Hindi as a singular language for official purposes and in schools. Lego argues that these efforts have often marginalized minority languages and cultures, leading to resistance and protests against what is perceived as linguistic hegemony. The paper calls for a more inclusive approach that respects India's linguistic diversity and ensures equal support for all languages in the education system.

Additionally, the article "Why does India's Hindu right-wing hate the Urdu language so much?" published by Quartz in 2021, discusses the animosity towards Urdu by certain factions within India, particularly the Hindu right-wing. This antipathy towards Urdu is linked to broader political and cultural dynamics, including historical tensions between religious and linguistic communities in India.

== Migration and Linguistic Homogenization ==
Critics argue that the promotion of Hindi as a pan-North Indian lingua franca has facilitated large-scale migration into more developed or demographically smaller states like Himachal Pradesh, Uttarakhand, Haryana, and Punjab. By leveraging a common language, migrants from other states often bypass the need to integrate linguistically or culturally, which some locals perceive as contributing to demographic shifts, urban crowding, and the decline of regional languages.

Unlike many European countries where local language proficiency is mandatory for access to jobs and public services, India's loosely enforced language policies make it easier for Hindi speakers and vice-versa non-Hindi speakers to access opportunities across India without adopting local languages. This has led to growing concerns about linguistic homogenization, cultural dilution, and the erosion of regional identities.

== Impact ==
Efforts by politicians to implement the imposition of Hindi has been criticised in the media, suggesting that politicians are calling non-Hindi speakers second-class citizens within their own nation.

To protest attempts at Hindi imposition, an 85-year-old farmer in Salem, Tamil Nadu committed suicide, stating that forcing Hindi in education would heavily disadvantage students.

=== Suggested remedies ===
M. K. Stalin, Chief Minister of Tamil Nadu, and Pinarayi Vijayan, Chief Minister of Kerala, have both demanded that all languages listed in the Eighth Schedule of the Constitution receive equal treatment. Vijayan has specifically stated that exam papers for standardised examinations should be prepared in all languages, while Stalin has urged the government of India to promote all languages and maintain equal educational and employment opportunities for speakers of all languages.

== See also ==
- Linguistic imperialism
- Hindi–Urdu controversy
- Bengali Language Movement
- Bengali Language Movement (Barak Valley)
- Bengali Language Movement (Manbhum)
- International Mother Language Day
- Promotion of Standard Chinese
