= Goreswar massacre =

- Location: Goreswar, Kamrup district (now Baksa district), Assam, India
- Date: 3 July 1960 (UTC+5:30)
- Target: Bengali Hindus
- Attack type: Massacre, ethnic cleansing, pogrom
- Weapons: Guns, spears, swords, scythes, bows and arrows
- Deaths: At least 9 men and 1 woman
- Injuries: More than 1,000; 50,000 people fled to West Bengal
- Perpetrator: Assamese mobs

The Goreswar massacre was the massacre of Bengali Hindus in Goreswar, in the Kamrup district (now Baksa district) of the Indian state of Assam. The massacre was part of a pre-planned pogrom, organized in a meeting of the local Teachers' Association.

== Background ==
During and after the independence of India movement, Bengali Hindus were ethnically cleansed in the Indian state of Assam. After the partition riots, the next major ethnic conflagration in Assam occurred during the Bengali language movement in 1960. The Government of Assam decided to make Assamese the only official language in the state. Bengali people protested against this decision as it would affect their employment prospects. The Barak Valley was a Bengali dominated area and became a centre of agitation. This in turn resulted in a spate of police shootings. In the Brahmaputra Valley, an Assamese-dominated area, Assamese mobs started attacking Bengalis.

== Pogrom ==
=== Planning ===
A report claims that there was a secret meeting in early July 1960, at a school in Sibsagar. This was said to have been organized by the Teachers' Association. During the meeting, the massacre was planned as an attack on the Bengalis. The next day a students' strike was organised at Sibsagar and groups of students and youths were sent to Jorhat, Dibrugarh and other adjoining areas to communicate the decision of the meeting.

=== Massacre ===
On 14 July 1960, riots began in Sibsagar with the looting of Bengali shops and assaults on several Bengalis. In lower Assam (Kamrup, Nowgong and Goalpara) intense violence occurred in 25 villages in Goreswar (in Kamrup district). On 3 July an Assamese mob of 15,000, armed with guns and other weapons, raided Bengali shops and houses. The whole area was ransacked. According to an inquiry commissioned under Justice Gopalji Mahotra, 4,019 huts and 58 houses were vandalized or destroyed. The commission reported that at least nine Bengalis were killed and more were wounded or crippled. There is also a report that one woman was attacked and raped. Nearly 1,000 Bengali Hindus fled from the area during the riot.

== Aftermath ==
Cumulative refugee figures from Assam in Jalpaiguri district, West Bengal
Date	Cumulative figures
16 July 1960	9,365
1 August 1960	18,340
21 August 1960	28,383
25 August 1960	c. 50,000

The worst phase of violence occurred between July and September 1960. Nearly 50,000 Bengali Hindus had crossed over to West Bengal to seek shelter by late August 1960. Chief Minister of West Bengal, Dr. B. C. Roy wrote a letter to the Prime Minister of India about the violence. According to his letter, at least 4,000 Bengali Hindus had been displaced to West Bengal between 5 and 11 July as a result of the riots, and 447 others who may not have been fleeing the riot. After 31 July the flow of refugees increased. In a subsequent letter, Roy wrote that 45,000 displaced Bengalis had taken shelter in West Bengal.

== See also ==
- Bongal Kheda
