= Persecution of Biharis in Bangladesh =

Ethnic persecution of the Bihari minority in Bangladesh

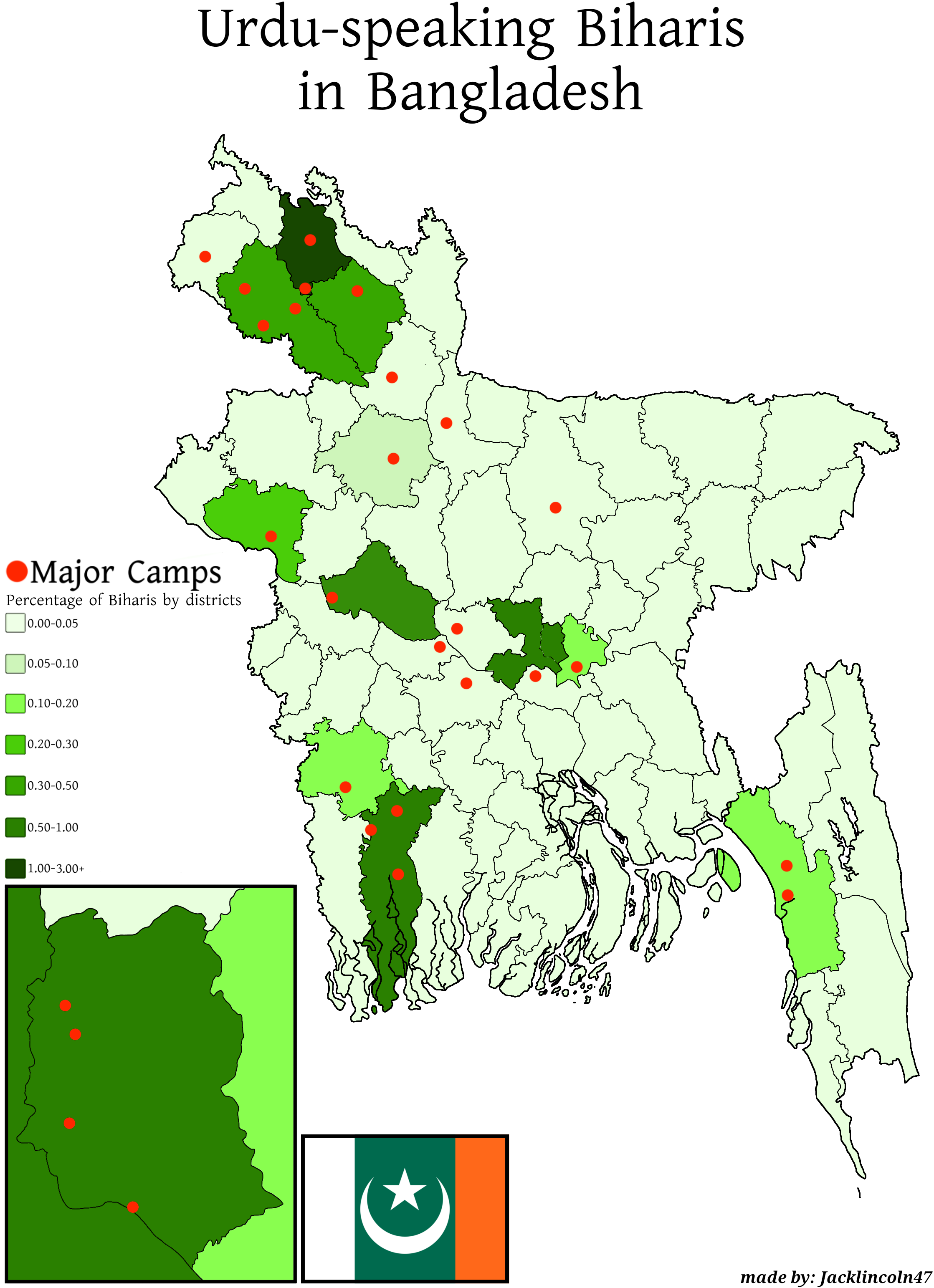
A map showing the distribution of Urdu-speaking Bihari communities in Bangladesh.

The Bihari minority in Bangladesh have experienced widespread discrimination. Within Bangladesh, the term Bihari implies the Urdu-speaking migrants from the Indian state of Bihar who settled in East Pakistan after the partition of India in 1947. Later on, all Urdu-speaking people, including Punjabis, Pathans, Sindhis and Baloch from West Pakistan, who were posted to East Pakistan or settled there were labeled as Biharis by Bengalis.

Biharis opposed the Bengali language movement of the people of then East Pakistan in the 1950s which stoked anti-Bihari sentiment. During the 1971 Bangladesh Liberation War, they largely maintained a pro-Pakistani stance, supported the Pakistan Armed Forces and opposed the independence of Bangladesh. Many Biharis became collaborators or accomplices of pro-government paramilitary groups in Pakistan Army's Bengali genocide which led to mass reprisal killings of Biharis.

Many migrated to Pakistan prior to, during and in the aftermath of the war. Those that remained have since assimilated into the Bengali population of Bangladesh though a significant number of them are still located in refugee camps across Bangladesh and are known as "Stranded Pakistanis". According to one estimate, at least 250,000 Biharis reside in urban refugee camps in Bangladesh. These Biharis have faced institutionalised discrimination linked to their citizenship status, and many live in squalor conditions.

== Background ==
The 1947 partition of India displaced between 12 and 18 million people. Millions of Muslims migrated from India to Pakistan while millions of Hindus and Sikhs migrated from Pakistan to India.

Along with several other parts of British India, Bihar (now a state in eastern India) was plagued by communal violence between Muslims and Hindus due to partition. Thousands of Bihari Muslims were killed in October and November 1946, the All-India Muslim League organized the rehabilitation of the Bihari refugees in Sind. The arrival of Bihari refugees in camps in Sindh and Bengal in 1946 paralleled the later movement of refugees in 1947. It is estimated that up to one million eventually migrated to East Pakistan.

== History ==
=== 1971 Bangladesh war ===
One reason cited for communal violence between Biharis and Bengalis was Bengali opposition to Urdu as a national language, which resulted in the Bengali language movement. The relatively secular attitude of East Pakistan increased tensions between the two communities and the two provinces of the country. In the 1970 general elections, Biharis predominantly supported the mostly Pakistan People's Party (based in West Pakistan) over the All-Pakistan Awami League (based in East Pakistan and overwhelmingly supported by Bengalis) and played an active anti-secessionist role during the liberation war.

Biharis supported the Pakistan Armed Forces during the subsequent Bangladesh Liberation War, comprising majorities in armed paramilitary groups such as Al-Shams, Razakars and Al-Badr which were responsible for the genocidal campaign against Bengali nationalists and both Bengali Hindu and Bengali Muslim civilians.

In early March 1971, 300 Biharis were killed. The Santahar massacre of Biharis was perpetrated by the Mukti Bahini, the Bengali resistance force, and Bengali mobs. This was used by the Pakistan Army as a justification to launch Operation Searchlight against the Bengali nationalist movement. Separately, from 25-28 March 1971, hundreds of Biharis were massacred at the Crescent Jute Mills, People's Jute Mills, and elsewhere in the city of Khulna by Bengali mobs.

Biharis were also massacred in Jessore and Khulna.

The magnitude of anti-Bihari attacks by Bengalis throughout the war are contested. The Minorities at Risk project puts the number of Biharis killed during the war at 1,000. Bengali sources admit the death of as many as 30,000 or 40,000 non-Bengalis. International estimates vary from 20,000 to 200,000. According to a white paper released by the Pakistani government, 64,000 Biharis and West Pakistanis were killed. The US Consul estimated 66,000 deaths.

In June 1971, Bihari representatives claimed a figure of 500,000 Biharis were killed. Although, according to the available census data of that time, the total Bihari population was approximately 1 million in East and West Pakistan in 1970 with the majority living in East Pakistan, approximately 300,000 left Bangladesh before and immediately after the beginning of the Liberation War to avoid reprisal attacks.

Scholars such as R. J. Rummel and Matthew White estimate the death toll of Bengali civilians killed during Pakistan Army's genocidal campaign at 1.5 million. And Rummel, a historian with the University of Hawaiʻi, concludes a prudent figure of 150,000 Bihari civilians murdered by Bengali militias in retaliation.

According to historian Christian Gerlach, many scholars have used the wartime actions of Biharis to understate/marginalize and/or justify atrocities against non-Bengalis or to suppress the memory of atrocities committed against them. Ishrat Ferdousi, a researcher on 1971 atrocities, said the attacks on Biharis can be termed "genocide". Sarmila Bose in her book 2011 Dead Reckoning: Memories of the 1971 Bangladesh War argues that Bengalis are in a state of denial about the massacre. The Liberation War Museum of Bangladesh has downplayed such massacres, calling them "isolated incidents."

=== Aftermath ===
Mukti Bahini members also retaliated against non-Bengalis (primarily West Pakistanis and Biharis) in the aftermath of the Bangladesh Liberation War, such retaliatory actions resulted in killings. In March 1972, thousands of Biharis were killed in the 1972 Khulna massacres by Bengali mobs.

=== 2014 Kalshi clashes ===
In 2014, members of the ruling Awami League, aided by police clashed with the members of the Urdu speaking community in Kalshi, Mirpur over land issues. During these clashes, nine people including eight members of a family were burnt alive by Awami League and their supporters.

The Biharis blamed the attacks being directed by Elias Mollah, the ethnic Bengali lawmaker of Mirpur. Elias Mollah denied involvement and blamed a "vested conspiracy" against him.

== Immigration, citizenship and reconciliation efforts ==
Due to their initial pro-Pakistan stance, the Biharis were consistent in their wish to be repatriated to Pakistan. Initially, 83,000 Biharis (58,000 former civil servants and military personnel), members of divided families and 25,000 hardship cases were evacuated to Pakistan.

The Supreme Court of Bangladesh ruled Biharis eligible for Bangladesh citizenship in 1972, and the Bangladesh government announced Presidential Order 149 (1972), offering citizenship to Biharis. According to government sources 600,000 Biharis accepted the offer, and 539,669 opted to return to Pakistan. According to historian Partha S. Ghosh approximately 470,000 out of these were repatriated to Pakistan through the International Red Cross. According to a United Nations High Commissioner for Refugees (UNHCR) report 170,000 Biharis were accepted by Pakistan in the Delhi Agreement, and by 1974, 108,000 had been transferred to Pakistan (mainly by air); however, the repatriation process later stalled. Surur Hoda, a socialist leader, played an active role in solving the refugee crisis. He organized a delegation, headed by British Labour Party politicians David Ennals and Ben Whitaker, which encouraged many refugees to return to Pakistan.

In 1977, 4,790 families were repatriated. The government of Pakistan later stepped away from their promise of repatriation and in 1978 stripped Pakistanis remaining in Bangladesh of Pakistani citizenship. Researchers such as Sumit Sen maintain that the Pakistani government's denationalisation of the Biharis and reluctance to rehabilitate them in Pakistan are sufficient evidence of persecution to warrant refugee status.

Though 2,800 still immigrated to Pakistan in 1979; 7,000 in 1981; 6,000 in 1984; and 50 families in 1993.

By 1982, Pakistan had received 169,000 Biharis. A total of approximately 178,069 Biharis were repatriated to Pakistan between 1973 and 1993. Of these, under the supervision of the UNHCR, over 119,000 Biharis were airlifted to Pakistan. Some Biharis also entered Pakistan through illegal means.

In 1988, the Organisation of Islamic Cooperation (OIC) raised about $500 million for the repatriation and rehabilitation of Biharis to Pakistan. A special committee, the Rabita (Coordination) Trust Board, was formed by Pakistan President Muhammad Zia-ul-Haq. It received $14 million by 1992, and was requesting additional donations from Saudi Arabia and other Gulf states for the rehabilitation of Biharis. Land allocated to Biharis in Pakistan in one colony in Mian Channu is now a slum. The Biharis were targeted by the ethnic Sindhi people during the 1980s Karachi riots.

Both countries have signed agreements on the repatriation of stateless people, but only a few hundred have reportedly managed to go to Pakistan. Organisations such as Refugees International have urged both governments to "grant citizenship to the hundreds of thousands of people who remain without effective nationality". As of 2006, the UNHCR had not addressed the plight of the Biharis.

During his 2002 trip to Bangladesh, Pakistan president Pervez Musharraf said he sympathised with the plight of the Biharis but could not allow them to emigrate to Pakistan. Several groups in Pakistan have since urged their government to accept the Biharis.

In May 2003, a High Court ruling in Bangladesh allowed ten Bihari refugees to obtain citizenship and voting rights. The ruling exposed a generation gap among Biharis. Younger Biharis were described as "elated" but many older people felt "despair at the enthusiasm" and said their true home was in Pakistan. Many Biharis now seek greater civil rights and citizenship in Bangladesh.

On 19 May 2008, the High Court approved citizenship and voting rights for about 150,000 refugees who were minors at the time of Bangladesh's 1971 war of independence. Those born in the country since the war also gained citizenship and the right to vote. Several political parties campaigned in the camps for the Bihari vote during the 2008 general election, and the group was considered important to parties and candidates. Although the court ruling explicitly said that the Biharis are eligible to register to vote in the December 2008 elections, the Election Commission closed its rolls in August 2008 without enrolling them.

== Refugee camps ==
The refugee camps housing Biharis have become slums, the largest of which, known as "Geneva Camp" in Mohammadpur, Dhaka, with over 25,000 people, is crowded and undeveloped; families up to 10 people typically live in a single room, one latrine is shared by 90 families and no more than five percent of the population has a formal education. Due to the lack of educational opportunity and poor living conditions, young men in the slums have set up an "Urdu Bhashi Jubo Chhatro Shongothon" (lit. 'Urdu-Speaking Young Students Association') to increase educational opportunities in their community. Health and sanitation problems persist due to poor drainage and sewage systems, and the economic condition of Bihari refugees has been described in news reports and academic journals as extremely poor.

The refugee camps housing Biharis, particularly the Geneva Camp, have frequently been reported as focal points for organized criminal activity, including drug trafficking and teen gangs. Due to extreme overcrowding, these settlements have faced significant challenges regarding policing and governance.

Reports from Bangladeshi media indicate that specific camps have become hubs for the narcotics trade, particularly involving Yaba and heroin. In late 2024, following the political transition in Bangladesh, the Geneva Camp witnessed intensified armed clashes between rival factions vying for control over the local drug trade. Most of the teen gangs plaguing Mohammadpur are controlled by the Bihari demographic and a disproportionate number of their members are of this demographic.

== See also ==
- Anti-Bihari sentiment
- Bihari Muslims
- Human rights in Bangladesh
- Mujahid Bahini (East Pakistan)
