= Adhikari =

Indian surname in Bengal, Bihar and Odisha, India

- Language: Nepali, Kumaoni, Odia, Bengali, Sinhalese

Origin
- Language: Sanskrit
- Origin: South Asia
- Derivation: Adhikar (Right/Authority)
- Meaning: Officer

Other names
- Variant form: Adhikary

Adhikari (also spelt Adhikary) is a surname originating in the Indian subcontinent. Those having their surname as Adhikari are mainly found in Bangladesh, Nepal and Indian states of Uttarakhand, West Bengal and also in fewer parts of Southern Bihar such as Bhagalpur, Purnea etc. as these areas have a greater influence of Bengali culture and many Bengalis have settled in these area. In Bengal, the Adhikari surname is found among different communities including Brahmins. In Nepal, Adhikari are of Brahmin, Chhetri and Rajbanshi. In Maharashtra, Madhya Pradesh and Gujarat, the Adhikari surname is generally found in the Chandraseniya Kayastha Prabhu community. The surname is also found among several groups including Bengalis, Biharis, Sinhalese, Odias, Nepalese, Kamatapuri and Kumaonis. Adhikari is literally translated as Officer.

== Notable people ==
- Ayush Adhikari, Indian professional footballer
- Amrit Bhushan Dev Adhikari, Indian writer from Assam
- Bharat Mohan Adhikari, Nepalese politician
- Deepak Adhikari, Indian film personality, better known as Dev
- Dibyendu Adhikari, Indian politician
- Gangadhar Adhikari, Indian communist leader
- Haribhakta Adhikari, Indian politician
- Hemu Adhikari, Indian cricketer
- Indra Adhikari, Bhutanese journalist in exile
- Keki Adhikari, Nepalese actress
- Khagaraj Adhikari, Nepalese politician from Communist Party of Nepal (Unified Marxist–Leninist)
- Khushal Singh Adhikari, Indian politician
- Kshetra Pratap Adhikary, Nepalese lyricist
- Man Mohan Adhikari, 31st Prime Minister of Nepal
- Michael Sushil Adhikari, Bangladesh politician
- Miriam Adhikari, South African physician
- Mohamed Adhikari, South African professor
- Mohan Chandra Adhikari, Nepalese communist politician
- Nanda Prasad Adhikari, Nepalese activist
- Narayan Prasad Adhikari, Nepalese politician
- Nisha Adhikari, Nepalese actress and model
- Rabindra Prasad Adhikari, Nepalese politician from CPN UML
- Rajesh Singh Adhikari, Indian soldier
- Ram Nath Adhikari, Nepalese politician
- Rana X. Adhikari, American experimental physicist
- Ranu Devi Adhikari, Nepalese singer
- Sadhan Kumar Adhikari, Indian physics professor
- Saroj Kumar Nath Adhikari, Bangladeshi educationist and political activist
- Shantidas Adhikari, Indian Hindu missionary
- Sisir Adhikari, Indian politician
- Suvendu Adhikari, Indian politician, Chief Minister of West Bengal
