= Santahar massacre =

1971 massacre in East Pakistan

- Native name: সান্তাহার গণহত্যা; سانتہار قتل عام
- Location: Santahar, Bogra, East Pakistan
- Date: March 27 - April 17, 1971
- Target: Biharis, non-Bengalis
- Attack type: Ethnic cleansing
- Weapon: Ram-daos
- Deaths: 1,400+ killed
- Perpetrator: Mukti Bahini

The Santahar massacre (Bengali: সান্তাহার গণহত্যা, Urdu: سانتہار کا قتل عام) was a massacre of thousands of Bihari and non-Bengali men, women and children in the railway town of Santahar, Naogaon District, East Pakistan, carried out by the Mukti Bahini and Bengali mobs between March and April 1971 during the Bangladesh Liberation War.

== Background ==
Santahar was a railway town in Bogra District, home to about 15,000 non-Bengalis in 1971 who lived in various neighbourhoods and areas of the town.

Eyewitness accounts state that on March 26, 1971, clashes emerged between Bengalis and Urdu-speaking inhabitants of the area.

At dawn of March 27, a contingent of the East Pakistan Rifles, policemen and East Pakistan Ansars arrived from Naogaon Cantonment and asked the Biharis to lay down their arms. However, these soldiers turned out to be rebels who had deserted and joined the Mukti Bahini.

In the afternoon of the same day of March 27, Biharis took refuge at the Jama Masjid of Chaibagan – close to the railway station – where eyewitnesses say that an armed mob entered the mosque and killed nearly all the people present in its open courtyard. About 60 people were massacred.

== Events ==
On 10 April, armed men attacked a factory where people had been taking refuge since 27 March were killed with machetes, swords and rods. By the evening, when the massacre of the men had been completed, the militants ordered the women and children either to return to their homes or to go to the railway station.

Victims allege that the Mukti Bahini men came everyday to the platform every day to ‘choose’ people to be taken to a bamboo hut of Haat Maidan. The Mukti Bahini announced that the station was to be made functional and the train service was now to be resumed.

By April 17, the Mukti Bahini had massacred all the non-Bengali residents of Santahar. Tahira, a survivor who hid in the house of a Bengali family said:

“On the morning of 17, armed men encircled the entire Station Colony and started closing in from all directions. It was a wholesale massacre in which there was no amnesty for anyone.”

Another survivor, Syed Pervez Afsar alleges that Bihari children had been killed, their bodies were dumped in the Rupsha river, while survivors were hunted down with machetes by boarding on boats.

Many non-Bengalis were also unfortunately raped according to reports in the massacre.

== Aftermath and reactions ==
On April 22, 1971, the Pakistan Army recaptured the Santahar railway station with the help of the local winemaker.

Ishrat Ferdousi, a researcher on 1971 atrocities, said attacks on Biharis can be termed as “genocide." Sarmila Bose in her book in 2011, Dead Reckoning: Memories of the 1971 Bangladesh War argues that the Bengalis are in a state of denial about the massacre.

The Bangladesh Liberation War Museum has admitted but downplayed the massacre, calling them "isolated instances of mob violence."

== See also ==
- Persecution of Biharis in Bangladesh
- 1971 Khulna jute mill massacres
- 1972 Khulna massacres
- Rape during the War in East Pakistan of 1971
- Human rights in East Pakistan
- Stranded Pakistanis in Bangladesh
- Bihari diaspora
