= 1971 Khulna jute mill massacres =

1971 massacre of Biharis in Khulna

1971 Khulna jute mills massacres
- Part of Persecution of Biharis in Bangladesh
- Location: Crescent Jute Mills and People's Jute Mills, Khulna, East Pakistan
- Date: 25-28 March 1971
- Target: Bihari civilians
- Attack type: Massacre, ethnic cleansing
- Deaths: 600–1,000
- Perpetrator: Bengalis
- Motive: Anti-Bihari sentiment

From 25 to 28 March 1971, hundreds of Bihari civilians, including men, women, and children, were massacred at the Crescent Jute Mills and People's Jute Mills in Khulna, East Pakistan (present-day Bangladesh) by Bengali nationalist mobs. Their bodies were dumped in a nearby river by the mob.

== See also ==
- Persecution of Biharis in Bangladesh
- Santahar massacre
- 1972 Khulna massacres
- 1971 Indo–Pakistani war
