= Anti-Bihari sentiment =

Discrimination against Biharis

Anti-Bihari sentiment refers to discrimination and prejudice faced by Bihari people in various parts of India. Historically, Bihar has witnessed slower economic growth compared to the national average, leading to mass migration of Biharis to other regions in search of better livelihood opportunities.

Migrant workers from Bihar have often encountered hostility and stereotyping in their host states. Negative portrayals have included associations with criminality, sexual violence, and disloyalty, contributing to social stigma and exclusion. Biharis have also been impacted by anti-Hindi sentiment in non-Hindi-speaking states, stemming from a perception that central government institutions give preferential treatment to Hindi compared to regional languages in national-level examinations and public services.

Biharis have been subjected to derogatory stereotyping through the slogan "Ek Bihari, Sau Bimari", which literally translates to "One Bihari, a hundred diseases." Biharis still practise old customs such as dowry, groom kidnapping, casteism irrespective of economic background etc.

== Causes ==
Between the late 1980s and 2005, Bihar faced significant economic challenges, due to a combination of poor governance and recurrent flooding caused by the Kosi River, often referred to as the "Sorrow of Bihar". Widespread corruption in regional politics, along with incidents of kidnappings targeting professionals who spoke out against such corruption and the domination of caste politics also contributed to an economic decline. This resulted in the emigration of capital, middle-class professionals, and business leaders to other parts of India.

The resulting increase of investment and talent worsened unemployment in the state, prompting large-scale migration of Bihari farmers and unemployed youth to more economically developed states. Bihar has a per capita income of approximately US$536 per annum, compared to the national average of US$1,470. About 30.6% of Bihar's population lives below the poverty line, higher than the national average of 22.15%. The level of urbanisation in the state is 10.5%, significantly below the national average of 27.78%, while urban poverty stands at 32.91%, compared to the national average of 23.62%. Bihar also has the highest population density and the lowest GDP per capita among all Indian states.

== Impact ==
=== Economic ===
Bihar has a per capita income of approximately US$936 per annum, significantly lower than the national average of US$2,624. Due to this income disparity, many workers from Bihar emigrate to other states in search of better-paying jobs, often agreeing to work for lower wages. For instance, in Tamil Nadu, inter-state migrant construction workers have been reported to earn between ₹300 and ₹400 per day, in contrast to the prescribed minimum wage of ₹750 per day.

The outflow of workers has had notable economic effects. After the departure of thousands of migrant labourers from Nashik, local industries expressed concern about increased operational costs, brought on by the need to hire more expensive local workers.

In an interview with The Times of India, Raj Thackeray, leader of the Maharashtra Navnirman Sena, remarked: "The city [Mumbai] cannot take the burden anymore. Look at our roads, our trains and parks. On the pipes that bring water to Mumbai are 40,000 huts. It is a security hazard. The footpaths too have been taken over by migrants. The message has to go to Bihar that there is no space left in Mumbai for you. After destroying the city, the migrants will go back to their villages. But where will we go then?"

Concerns regarding the strain on urban infrastructure due to migration have also been raised by mainstream political leaders. Former Maharashtra Chief Minister Vilasrao Deshmukh acknowledged that unchecked migration had put pressure on the state's basic infrastructure. Nevertheless, he appealed to migrant workers from Bihar to remain in Maharashtra, even during periods of intense anti-North Indian agitation.

Similarly, Sheila Dikshit, the then Chief Minister of Delhi, commented that migration from Bihar was placing an increasing burden on the capital's infrastructure. She stated, "These people come to Delhi from Bihar but don't ever go back, causing a burden on Delhi's infrastructure."

== Violence ==
=== Bangladesh ===
Many Biharis in Bangladesh were Urdu-speaking and supported the Pakistan Armed Forces during the Bangladesh Liberation War. Their opposition to the Bengali language movement and the independence of Bangladesh led to significant reprisals by the Mukti Bahini and other militias. Various reports estimate that up to 150,000 Biharis may have been killed during this period.

=== Nepal ===
Biharis in Nepal have reportedly faced social discrimination and been subjected to derogatory terms such as raddi kaghaz (lit 'waste paper', or 'rags'), khaali botal (lit 'empty bottle'), and Bihari bhaiya (lit 'brother from bihar'). In one incident, a Bihari was killed and two others were injured after Nepalese armed police opened fire near the Lalbandi border outpost.

=== Attacks on Sikhs ===
Following the 1984 anti-Sikh riots and massacres in Bihar, a significant number of Sikhs residing in areas such as Patna City, Lalji Tola, and Exhibition Road began relocating from Bihar. The trend continued into the 1990s due to deteriorating law and order and rising extortion. Majority of Sikhs were murdered in cities of Patna, Bokaro etc during 1984 anti-sikh riots.

In 2022, a group of Sikh pilgrims from Punjab were attacked in Bhojpur district when their vehicle was stopped, and the driver was assaulted during a dispute over a religious donation. At least seven sustained injuries.

=== Attacks on Bengalis ===
During the period often referred to as "Jungle Raj" (1989–2004) under Chief Minister Lalu Prasad Yadav, several Bengali families reportedly faced violence and displacement. Many were forced to resettle in neighbouring states like Jharkhand and West Bengal. Reports suggest incidents of violence, kidnapping, and property seizure.

=== Attacks on journalists ===
Bihar has witnessed multiple incidents of attacks on journalists, ranking among the highest in India. These have involved political groups, local mafias, and others. Media watchdogs have raised concerns over freedom of expression in the state.

=== Economic stigma and employment ===
Bihari migrant workers have often been employed in low-wage and low-skilled jobs across India, such as rickshaw pulling, sanitation work, and daily wage labour. Some critics argue that this influx lowers regional income averages. Bihar's GDP per capita remains among the lowest in the country.

=== Protests and demonstrations ===
In October 2008, student protests erupted in Bihar following attacks on North Indian candidates during a Railway Recruitment Board examination in Maharashtra, allegedly carried out by Maharashtra Navnirman Sena (MNS) activists. Protests included rail blockades and hunger strikes. Several FIRs were filed against MNS leader Raj Thackeray in Bihar and Jharkhand.

=== Attacks against Bihari people ===
In Kolhapur, a group of fifteen to twenty Maharashtra Navnirman Sena members on motorcycles attacked migrant workers from Uttar Pradesh on 13 August 2013 after the alleged rape of a two-year-old girl.

The February 2008 tirade against North Indians started with clashes between MNS and SP workers at Dadar in Mumbai. MNS chief Thackeray explained that the attack was a reaction to the uncontrolled dadagiri of migrants and leaders from Uttar Pradesh and Bihar. Workers also pelted stones at the offices of Bhojpuri actor Manoj Tiwari and North Indian Congress leader Sanjay Nirupam. Thackeray invoked the issue of Marathi pride, this time lashing out at the North Indians in an article titled "Majhi bhumika, majha ladha" (My stand, my struggle) written by him in the Marathi daily Maharashtra Times. MNS workers destroyed government property to vent their anger against the reported move to arrest Raj. Vilasrao Deshmukh admitted that his government was responsible for the failure in preventing the attacks by MNS on North Indian candidates at Railways examination centres and ordered a probe into the incident. In October, Thackeray was arrested in Ratnagiri after Mumbai police had received a non-bailable warrant issued by a Jamshedpur court against the MNS chief. The arrested again ignited violence by his supporters in large parts of the city forcing it to shut down.

=== Other consequences ===
Since November 2005, there has been a significant fall in the number of migrant workers in many parts of India. After the early 2008 migrant crisis and bombing of a Bhojpuri cinema hall in Punjab, Biharis decided to stay away from states of the North East and Punjab. Culturally, Biharis appear to reject films based heavily on Punjabi culture. In August 2008, the film Singh Is Kinng starring Akshay Kumar, which was a success in India, flopped in Bihar. Akshay Kumar’s films, such as Jaanwar and Heyy Babyy, have traditionally performed well in Bihar. In this case, however, the film’s heavy use of Punjabi language and cultural references was said to be the main reason it failed to connect with the Bihari audience.

==== Assam ====
Members of the Veer Lachit Sena gathered at a petrol pump in Guwahati, haranguing two of its employees – Tuntun Kumar and Govindagiri, both from Bihar. Some reportedly shouted, “Hey Biharis, you want a beating?”, while the two employees were being shoved and heckled. Singh claimed the Lachit Sena also hit 31-year-old Govindagiri, who left Assam soon afterwards. "They have told us, not a single Bihari should be seen", recounted Singh.

Karbi Longri National Liberation Front militants from the Karbi tribe called three Bihari men out of their homes and shot them dead in the village of Bamuni Sukanjuri in central Assam's Nagaon district.

==== Delhi ====
A student at Delhi University's Kirori Mal College was assaulted by a group of fellow students. The student reported that he was targeted for money and referred to as "Bihar wala". He stated that they would demand money and say, "You are from Bihar. Things don't work your way," indicating discrimination based on his Bihari background.

Arvind Kejriwal, the former Chief Minister of Delhi, stated that "Fake voters are being brought from Uttar Pradesh and Bihar, in the last 15 days, 13,000 applications for new votes have come. Fake votes are made by bringing people from UP & Bihar".

A 21-year-old delivery worker from Bihar named Pandav Kumar was shot and killed by an off-duty Delhi Police head constable in southwest Delhi's Jaffarpur Kalan on April 26, 2026 because he was a Bihari.

==== Punjab ====
An elderly woman from Bihar was beaten multiple times by two Sikh men for allegedly smoking inside the Golden Temple complex.

A man from Patna was beaten to death for allegedly trying to remove a religious flag from a gurdwara in Kapurthala district. The man allegedly tried to remove Nishan Sahib, a religious flag of the Sikhs, from atop a gurdwara in Nizampur. He was caught and subsequently beaten to death.

==== Haryana ====
An MLA from Haryana made the remark "Bihar girls for Haryana men". The Bihar Women's Commission took suo motu cognizance of reports about the leader's remark and issued a notice to him.

In Haryana, there was one instance of the family of a woman from Bihar who was paid just ₹1000 for marrying off their Bihari daughter. An NGO found 27 Bihari women were married off to Haryana men with prices ranging from ₹10,000 up to 1.5 lakh.

Union minister Piyush Goyal said that "If it were up to them, they would turn the whole country into Bihar."

==== Maharashtra ====
North Indian students, including students from Bihar, who were preparing for the railway entrance exam were attacked by supporters of Raj Thackeray's far-right MNS party in Mumbai on 20 October 2008. One student from Bihar was killed during the attacks. Four people were killed and another seriously injured in the violence that broke out in a village near Kalyan following the arrest of Thackeray. Bihar Chief Minister Nitish Kumar demanded action against the MNS activists and full security to students. Nitish Kumar requested Maharashtra Chief Minister Vilasrao Deshmukh's intervention. Kumar directed the additional director general of police to contact senior police officials in Maharashtra and compile a report on the incident and asked the home commissioner to hold talks with the Maharashtra home secretary to seek protection for people from Bihar.

In 2003, the Shiv Sena alleged that, of the 500 Maharashtrian candidates, only ten of them were successful in the Railways exams. 90 per cent of the successful candidates were alleged to be from Bihar. Activists from the Shiv Sena ransacked a railway recruitment office in protest against non-Marathi's being among the 650,000 candidates set to compete for 2,200 railway jobs in the state. Eventually, after attacks on Biharis heading towards Mumbai for exams, the central government delayed the exams. It is noteworthy that leaders from Bihar, including Lalu Prasad Yadav and Ram Vilas Paswan, were the Minister for Railways for a long time. Thackeray alleged that there was a preference for the North Indian candidates by these ministers. He lauded the next Railway minister Mamata Banerjee for including regional languages in the Railway Recruitment Board exams, allowing a level playing field for Marathis and other non-Hindi speakers.

==== North East states ====
Biharis have sought work in many states that form part of North East India. There were significant communities in Assam, Nagaland, and Manipur. Biharis who come to work as labourers are frequently and especially targeted in Assam by ULFA militants. There is fear amongst the local population that Bihari migrants will dominate and annihilate the regional culture and the language. As with all migrations in history, it has created tensions with the local population, which has resulted in large-scale violence. In 2000 and 2003, anti-Bihari violence led to the deaths of up to 200 people and created 10,000 internal refugees. Similar violent incidents have also taken place recently in Manipur and Assam. According to K P S Gill, waves of xenophobic violence have swept across Assam repeatedly since 1979, targeting Bangladeshis and Biharis.

==== Rajasthan ====
On 13 May 2016, a student named Satyarth was beaten to death and another student was injured in an incident that occurred in Kota, Rajasthan. Regarding the event, BJP MLA Bhawani Singh Rajawat of Kota stated that "Students from Bihar are spoiling the atmosphere of city and they must be driven out of the city."

The government in Rajasthan assured full protection to students from Bihar, after ragging incidents of Bihari students in a private engineering college in Udaipur surfaced. Lalu Prasad Yadav and Ram Vilas Paswan flayed the attacks on Bihari students in Rajasthan, saying that the students were subjected to insult and torture and assaulted with sticks when they protested. Former chief minister Rabri Devi called upon the chief minister to take necessary action and assure the safety of the students. According to reports, several Bihari students were thrashed during the ragging.

==== Gujarat ====
In October 2018, there were incidents of attacks on Hindi-speaking migrants in Gujarat after the alleged rape of a 14-month-old in a village near Himmatnagar in northern Gujarat by a Bihari. The attacks triggered an exodus of migrants.

==== Karnataka ====
A video of a man, purportedly from Muzaffarpur in Bihar, accusing three people in Rajajinagar of abusing and harassing him as he did not speak Kannada, went viral.

==== Kerala ====
A 36-year-old Bihar native was allegedly beaten to death by locals in Kerala's Malappuram after being suspected of theft.

==== Uttarakhand ====
The husband of Rekha Arya, a minister from Uttarakhand, allegedly said at an event in Almora, "Will you get married in old age? If you are unable to get married, we will bring a girl for you from Bihar. You can get one there for Rs 20,000 to 25,000."

==== Himachal ====
The Chief Minister of Himachal Pradesh, Sukhvinder Singh Sukhu, blamed Bihari architects for the low standard of buildings in his state. He further stated that "The houses which are collapsing these days have not gone through the standards of structural engineering. The migrant architects (masons), whom I call 'Bihari architects', come here and construct floor on floor. We do not have local masons".

==== Goa ====
Goa Chief Minister Pramod Sawant has said that about 90% of the crimes in the coastal State are committed by migrant labourers from Bihar.

==== Bengal ====
In 2019, in a hate-crime incident, Bihari passengers on board a Patna-bound bus alleged that they were beaten up by a group of men over their regional identity in Bardhaman district of West Bengal.

TMC MP Mahua Moitra called BJP MP and panel member Nishikant Dubey "Bihari gunda".

== Controversial statements ==
=== Editorial by Bal Thackeray ===
The late Shiv Sena leader Bal Thackeray commented in the party newspaper Samnna on why Biharis are disliked outside eastern states. He quoted part of a text message as the title of his article. The message suggested that Biharis bring diseases, violence, job insecurity, and domination wherever they go. The text message says, "Ēka Bihārī, sau bīmārī. Dō Bihārī, laḍa़āī kī taiyārī. Tīna Bihārī ṭrēna hamārī aura pām̐ca Bihārī tō sarakāra hamārī." (One Bihari equals hundred diseases, Two Biharis are preparing for fight, Three Biharis it is a train hijack, and five Biharis will try to form the ruling Government).

Nitish Kumar and Lalu Prasad Yadav protested against the remark, demanding official condemnation of Bal Thackeray. Kumar, during a press report at Patna Airport, said, "If Manmohan Singh fails to intervene in what is happening in Maharashtra, it would mean only one thing – he is not interested in resolving the issue and that would not be good for the leader of the nation". Angered by Thackeray's insulting remark against the Bihari community, Rashtriya Janata Dal (RJD) activists burned the effigy of the Shiv Sena chief at Kargil Chowk in Patna and said that the senior Thackeray had completely lost his marbles and needed to be immediately committed to a mental asylum.

== Consequences ==
=== Protests and demonstrations ===
Angry students in various parts of Bihar disrupted train traffic, as protests continued against assaults on north Indians by MNS activists in Mumbai. Noted physician Dr. Diwakar Tejaswi observed a day-long fast in Patna to protest against repeated violence by Raj Thackeray and his supporters. Various student organisations gave a call for a Bihar shutdown on 25 October 2008 to protest the railway recruitment examination attacks.

Various cases were filed in Bihar and Jharkhand against Thackeray for assaulting the students. A murder case was also filed by Jagdish Prasad, father of Pawan Kumar, who was allegedly killed by MNS activists in Mumbai. The Mumbai Police, however, claimed it was an accident. Nitish Kumar announced compensation of ₹1,50,000 to Pawan's family. Bihar state Congress chief Anil Kumar Sharma demanded enactment of an Act by Parliament for closing opportunities to any political party or organisation that indulges in obscurantism and raises narrow, chauvinistic issues based on regionalism to capture power. A murder case was also lodged against Thackeray and 15 others in a court in Jharkhand on 1 November 2008, following the death of a train passenger in the previous month in Maharashtra. According to the Dhanbad police, their Mumbai counterparts termed Sakaldeo's death an accident. According to social scientist Dr. Shaibal Gupta, the beating of students from Bihar has consolidated Bihari sub-nationalism.

=== Rahul Raj ===
Rahul Raj, from Patna, was shot dead by the police aboard a bus in Mumbai on 27 October 2008. Rahul was 23 years old and was brandishing a pistol. He was not shooting at public but was considered a major threat to public security. The Mumbai police alleged that he wanted to assassinate Raj Thackeray. Nitish Kumar questioned the police action, but R R Patil justified it and restored public security. It was alleged that Rahul was protesting against the attacks on Bihari and Uttar Pradeshi candidates appearing for railway examinations. The Mumbai crime branch was looking into the incident. During Rahul's funeral, slogans of "Raj Thackeray murdabad" and "Rahul Raj amar rahe" were heard. Despite the Mumbai police's allegations, there was high-level government representation at the funeral. Bihar Deputy CM Sushil Kumar Modi and PHED minister Ashwini Kumar Chaubey represented the state government at the cremation, which was also attended by Patna MP Ram Kripal Yadav. The bier was carried by Rahul's friends, even as the district administration had arranged a flower-bedecked truck for the purpose.

=== Attacks against Marathis ===
After the October 2008 anti-Bihari attacks in Maharashtra, members of the Bharatiya Bhojpuri Sangh (BBS) vandalised the official residence of Tata Motors Jamshedpur plant head S.B. Borwankar, a Maharashtrian. Armed with lathis and hockey sticks, more than 100 BBS members trooped to Borwankar's Nildih Road bungalow around 3:30 pm. Shouting anti-MNS slogans, they smashed windowpanes and broke flowerpots. BBS president Anand Bihari Dubey called the attack on Borwankar's residence unfortunate, and said that he knew BBS members were angry after the attack in Maharashtra on Biharis, but did not expect a reaction. Fear of further violence gripped the 4,000-odd Maharashtrians settlers living in and around the city. Two air-conditioned bogies of the train Vikramshila Express – reportedly with Maharashtrian passengers on board – were set on fire in the Barh area of Bihar. Hundreds of slogan-shouting students surrounded Barh railway station in rural Patna, demanding that Raj Thackeray be tried for sedition. No one was reported injured and the passengers fled as soon as the attackers started setting the bogies on fire.

In another incident, a senior woman government official in Bihar with the surname Thackeray was the target of an angry mob that surrounded her office and shouted slogans against her in Purnia district. Ashwini Dattarey Thackeray was the target of a mob of over 200 people. The mob, led by a local leader of the Lok Janashakti Party, surrounded Thackeray's office in Purnia and shouted slogans like, "Go back Maharashtrians" and "Officer go back, we do not need your services".

A gang of 25 people pelted stones on the Maharashtra Bhawan in Khalasi Line, Kanpur, Uttar Pradesh. Constructed in 1928, the building is owned by the lone trust run by Marathis in Kanpur. It has served as an important venue for prominent festivals, including Ganesh Utsav and Krishna Janmashtami. On 29 October, in Ghaziabad, Marathi students at Mahanand Mission Harijan PG College were attacked, allegedly by an Uttar Pradesh student leader and his friends. Police sources in Ghaziabad confirmed the victims stated in their FIR that the attackers "mentioned Rahul Raj and Dharam Dev" while kicking them in their hostel rooms. A group of 20 youths from Bihar attacked Maharashtra Sadan in the capital on 3 November. The Rashtrawadi Sena claimed responsibility for the attack. They ransacked the reception of the building and raised slogans against Raj Thackeray.

=== Bhojpuri film industry relocation ===
The Bhojpuri film industry is considering moving out of Mumbai owing to threats from MNS workers, and growing insecurity. With an average output of 75 movies per annum and an over 150 million target audience, the Bhojpuri film industry employs hundreds of unskilled and semi-skilled people from the state in various stage of production and distribution. The industry, which has around 50 registered production houses in Mumbai, has initiated talks with Uttar Pradesh and Bihar. "We have given a proposal to the Uttar Pradesh government through its Culture Minister Subhash Pandey for setting up the industry in Lucknow. Besides, we are also counting on some other options like Delhi, Noida and Patna," Bhojpuri actor and producer Manoj Tiwari said. The films have a large market because the Bhojpuri diaspora is spread over countries like Mauritius, Nepal, Dubai, Guyana, West Indies, Fiji, Indonesia, Suriname and the Netherlands. 70 per cent of the total production cost of a Bhojpuri film — budgets of which range from ₹ 80 lakh to ₹1.25 crore — is usually spent in Maharashtra, providing direct employment to junior artists, make-up men, spot boys and local studios among others.

=== Present times ===
However, the state government, post 2005, has made an effort to improve the economic condition of the state, and reduce the need for migration. In 2008, the state government approved over ₹ 70,000 crore worth of investment, has had record tax collection, broken the political-criminal nexus, made improvements in power supply to villages, towns and cities. Bihar, a state fraught with abject poverty, has come out on top as the fastest growing state second year in a row, with 13.1 percent growth in 2011–2012. Its economy has also grown bigger than that of Punjab — the prime destination for Bihari workers. They have laid greater emphasis on education and learning by appointing more teachers, and opening a software park. State Ministers who have failed to live up to election commitments have been dismissed. Bihar's GSDP grew by 18% over the period 2006–2007, which was higher than in the past 10 years and one of the highest recorded by the Government of India for that period.

== See also ==
- 2008 attacks on North Indians in Maharashtra
- Anti-Indian sentiment
- Groom kidnapping
- Permanent Settlement
- Ethnic relations in India
- Persecution of Biharis in Bangladesh
- Freight equalisation policy
