= 1972 Khulna massacres =

1972 massacre in Bangladesh

- Part of Persecution of Biharis in Bangladesh
- Location: Khulna, Bangladesh
- Date: March 1972
- Attack type: Massacre, ethnic cleansing
- Deaths: 1,000–25,000
- Victim: Bihari civilians
- Perpetrator: Bengalis
- Motive: Anti-Bihari sentiment

In March 1972, thousands of ethnic Bihari civilians in Khulna, Bangladesh were massacred by Bengali mobs in various attacks and mass killings carried out over a period of days. Bihari civilians, including women, children, and workers in jute mills, were massacred by Bengali mobs wielding knives and machetes, and their homes were set on fire. Estimates of the death toll range from 1,000 to several thousand Biharis massacred by Bengali mobs wielding knives and machetes; survivors of the massacre have reported a death toll of up to 25,000 victims. Many of the bodies of the dead were thrown into the Bhairab River.

The massacres in Khulna took place during the rule of Prime Minister Mujibur Rahman following the independence of Bangladesh from Pakistan in 1971 as part of a broader wave of anti-Bihari riots and massacres in the 1970s in Bangladesh (formerly East Pakistan), as Biharis generally supported Pakistan in the 1971 Indo–Pakistani war.

== See also ==
- Santahar massacre
- 1971 Khulna jute mill massacres
- Persecution of Biharis in Bangladesh
