= Murder of Masonda Ketada Olivier =

Masonda Ketada Olivier
- Born: Masonda Ketada Olivier; 1989 or 1990
- Died: May 22, 2016 (age 26); New Delhi, India

Masonda Ketada Olivier was a Congolese national who died after being assaulted in the Indian city of New Delhi on the night of 22 May 2016. Olivier had been in New Delhi as a student, and also taught French in a language school in the city.

On the night of his death, he is said to have been returning from a party with his friends, and attempted to hail an autorickshaw in the Vasant Kunj suburb of Delhi when he got into an altercation with some local men, who then assaulted Olivier. He was rescued by another group of local people and taken to AIIMS, but succumbed to his injuries on the way.

Olivier's death precipitated a crisis of international relations between India and a number of nations within the African continent, who highlighted the incident as an example of racism in India. India's external affairs minister put out a statement condemning the attack, but also noting the attack was not racist. Diplomats from a number of African nations threatened to boycott the official Indian government celebrations of Africa Day in New Delhi. This prompted interventions and assurances from the Indian government assuring safety of African nationals in India.

Stores belonging to Indians in Congo were attacked a few days after the incident, and a group of Africans was assaulted on May 28. India's Catholic bishops condemned the attacks.
