= Chowmein (slur) =

Chowmein is a racial slur originating from India that is used against Chinese people, or other Asian people perceived to be Chinese. The phrase originates from Chow mein, which is a Chinese-American dish.

"Chowmein" is often used against Northeast Indians, where harmful stereotypes cause people to abuse Northeast Indians and call them "chowmein". This may be due to them looking similar to stereotypical East Asian people, as well as due to some of their languages being in the Sino-Tibetan language family.

== World Chess Championship incident ==
A newspaper reporting on the World Chess Championship in 2024 used the headline "Sambhar outwits chowmein" was heavily criticized for using the term chowmein to describe Ding Liren, with the headline being called racist.

== See also ==
- Ching chong
- Racism in India
