= Panoriya =

Odia-speaking community in Tripura Northeast India

The Panoriyas are an Odia-speaking community in Tripura, India. They are generally concentrated in western Tripura. Originally migrating from Odisha, the community is largely settled near tea gardens.

Earlier members of the community used 'Panoriya' as their surname. They community largely ignores the varna hierarchy.

== Surnames ==
In recent times many members of the community has taken surnames like Nayak, Adhikari and Tanti.
