= Adhikar =

Adhikar may refer to:

== Films ==
- Adhikar (1939 film), starring P.C. Barua
- Adhikar (1954 film), starring Usha Kiran
- Adhikar (1971 film), a Hindi film starring Ashok Kumar
- Adhikar (1971 Marathi film), starring Shammi
- Adhikar (1986 film), starring Rajesh Khanna
- Adhikar (1990 film), a Nepali film starring Rajesh Hamal
- Adhikar (1992 film), starring Prosenjit
- Adhikar (TV series), directed by Jahnu Barua

== Organizations ==
- Odhikar, a Bangladesh human rights organization

== See also ==
- Adhikari, Indian title and surname
- Adhikari, 1991 Indian film
- Adhikaram, 1980 Indian film
