= Indra Adhikari =

Bhutanese journalist in exile

Indra Adhikari (or I. P. Adhikari) is a Bhutanese journalist in exile. He was the founder of Bhutan News Service. He was a former Bhutanese refugee, forced to leave Bhutan along with his family in 1992.

== Career ==
He started The Shangrila Sandesh in 2001 but did not work for the paper for long. In 2004 he, along with Vidhyapati Mishra, started the Association of Press Freedom Activists (APFA) Bhutan. In 2007 they started Bhutan News Service. He worked in The Rising Nepal, The Himalayan Times, Nation Weekly and Nepalnews.com while living in Nepal as refugee. His articles also appeared on Himal South Asia magazine.

Adhikari also taught Journalism and Development Communication for bachelor's and master's degrees in College of Journalism and Mass Communication between 2006 and 2010. He then moved to Australia under the resettlement program of the UNHCR for Bhutanese Refugees.

In Adelaide, Australia he founded Yuba Sansar, which was later renamed as Radio Pahichan (https://www.radiopahichan.com/our-team/), a weekly Nepali-language radio program aired through Radio Adelaide. He is associated with Special Broadcasting Service, a multilingual state owned media corporation.

In 2019 he established the Bhutan Watch, a think tank, that specialises on Bhutan and Bhutanese issues. He is editor of The Bhutan Journal, published by the Bhutan Watch (http://www.bhutanwatch.org/wp-content/uploads/2023/02/TBJ-4.pdf).
