= Human rights in East Pakistan =

Human rights in East Pakistan is about human rights in East Pakistan.

== Language movement ==
The Bengali language movement began after the independence of Pakistan. Many Bengalis demanded that Bengali be made a national language of Pakistan, while Pakistani national leaders wanted Urdu to be the national language. On 21 February 1952, the police fired at a crowd of protestors, killing four people. The next day, Pakistani security forces attacked demonstrations again resulting in deaths and injuries.

== Religious minorities ==
The government and military elites of Pakistan viewed the Hindu minority in East Pakistan as a fifth column. They blamed the Hindus for the economic backwardness of East Pakistan. The 1970 election held under the joint electorate only got to minority member elected to the National assembly. During the Bangladesh War of Independence, Hindus were targeted by the Pakistan Army and local collaborators supporting them.

== War in East Pakistan and Bangladesh War of Independence ==
=== Genocide ===
The genocide refers to the selective mass killing in East Pakistan by Pakistani security establishments during the Bangladesh War of Independence. The University of Dhaka was attacked resulting in the death of students and staff. Newspaper offices and Hindu neighbourhoods were shelled by Pakistan Army in Dhaka.

=== Attacks on Bihari and Non-Bengali community ===
Biharis and non-Bengalis were also attacked in the war, Thousands of Biharis were killed in ethnic violence in different areas of East Pakistan. In one such incident in Santahar, thousands of non-Bengalis were killed, raped and massacred by miscreants affiliated with the Mukti Bahini.

=== Killings of intellectuals ===
The Pakistani security forces and collaborators tried to eliminate Bengali nationalism through the killing of Bengali intellectuals. It resulted in the killing of over a thousand intellectuals including doctors, educationists, lawyers, engineers, etc. On 14 December 1971, two days before the surrender of Pakistani forces, 200 intellectuals were abducted from their home and killed.
