= Bhutan News Service =

Bhutanese news agency

Bhutan News Service (BNS)
- Founded: 2004
- Headquarters: Kathmandu, Nepal
- Products: online news services
- Website: bhutannewsservice.com

Bhutan News Service (BNS) is an independent news agency run by Bhutanese refugee journalists since 2004 from Kathmandu, the capital city of Nepal. It is solely operated by refugees who were mostly born or brought up in refugee camps and without previous media experience.

When over 100,000 of Bhutanese refugees started taking shelter in UN-administered refugee camps of Jhapa and Morang districts in eastern part of Nepal, they felt the need for vocal media in the refugee community. Several failed attempts were made before the advent of the Bhutan News Service.

The Bhutan News Service was founded in 2004 by a small group of Bhutanese refugee youth It emerged in as an alternative to traditional forms of media publications. Initially, the works were limited to simply blogging. From 2006, BNS went online through its own news portal.

APFA initiated a joint effort for press freedom and called on two other media organizations working for press freedom in Bhutan and operating in exile. Thus a conference was held in eastern Nepal making a historic declaration vowing to expedite fight for press freedom. The first media conference adopted "Declaration Dé Exile". The declaration also accepted the APFA proposal to accept Bhutan News Service as the common and first news agency of Bhutan, but operating from exile.

— Barren Land of Press Freedom: Annual Press Freedom Report of Bhutan 2008-2009

Currently, around two dozen reporters and over half a dozen of editors from various countries contribute for the news service on voluntary basis. The news agency has not been legally registered since Nepalese laws do not entertain registration of any entity owned and run by foreign nationals in Nepalese soil.

According to former Indian diplomat Phunchok Stobdan, the regular Bhutanese media avoids reporting on Chinese border incursions and other strategic matters, so that the Bhutan News Service and other such exile media are the only sources available for reliable information.
