= Nanda Prasad Adhikari =

- Born: 1961 or 1962
- Died: 22 September 2014
- Occupation: Author

Nanda Prasad Adhikari (Nepali:नन्द प्रसाद अधिकारी; 1961 or 1962 – 22 September 2014) was a Nepali citizen who sought justice after his son was killed. Adhikari died, after an 11-month hunger strike, demanding that the Nepali government arrest the murderers of his son.

Adhikari's son, Krishna Prasad Adhikari, was abducted from Chitwan during the Nepali Maoist Conflict. He was killed in Bakulahar Chowk in Chitwan District in June 2004. Nanda Prasad began a hunger strike protest along with his wife, Ganga Maya. The striking couple were admitted to Bir Hospital after their health conditions was deteriorated. Various human rights organizations stated their concern in connection with the Adhikari couple's demand and the strike. The Asian Human Rights Commission has requested the UN Human Right Council (UNHRC) to bring pressure upon the Nepali government.

Adhikari died at the age of 52 in Bir Hospital on 22 September 2014, after 11 months on hunger strike

After the death of Nanda Prasad, the Government of Nepal was criticized by various human right organizations as well as the public. The National Human Rights Commission (Nepal) has expressed its serious concern regarding Nanda Prasad Adhikari's death and Ganga Maya's continued strike.

== See also ==
- Nepalese Civil War
