= Teen gangs in Bangladesh =

Teen Gang Culture in Bangladesh

Teen gang culture in Bangladesh, locally called Kishor Gangs (Bengali: কিশোর গ্যাং), encompasses the presence and activities of organized youth gangs primarily composed of teenagers involved in various criminal undertakings within urban areas of the country. The rise of these gangs presents significant challenges to law enforcement agencies and communities in Bangladesh. As of January 2024, there are around 50 active teen gangs in just the capital city of Bangladesh, Dhaka. Numerous more are based in other parts of the country. These gangs are often backed by a section of ruling party leaders, who act as influential "elder brothers."

== Background ==
=== Emergence ===
The emergence of teen gangs in Bangladesh can be traced back to the late 1990s, a period characterized by rapid urbanization and socio-economic changes that created an environment conducive to the formation of such groups. Experts note factors such as poverty, lack of education, unemployment, family dysfunction, and exposure to violence have contributed to the growth of this subculture among the youth. These circumstances have driven some teenagers to seek a sense of identity, belonging, and power within the structure of gangs.

=== Characteristics ===
Teen gangs in Bangladesh exhibit distinct characteristics that define their identity and operations. These groups typically adopt a hierarchical structure, with leaders exerting control and influence over their members. Members often demonstrate their affiliation through specific clothing styles or distinctive hairstyles. The territorial nature of these gangs frequently leads to conflicts and violent clashes with rival groups as they vie for control over certain areas.

== Activities and criminal involvement ==
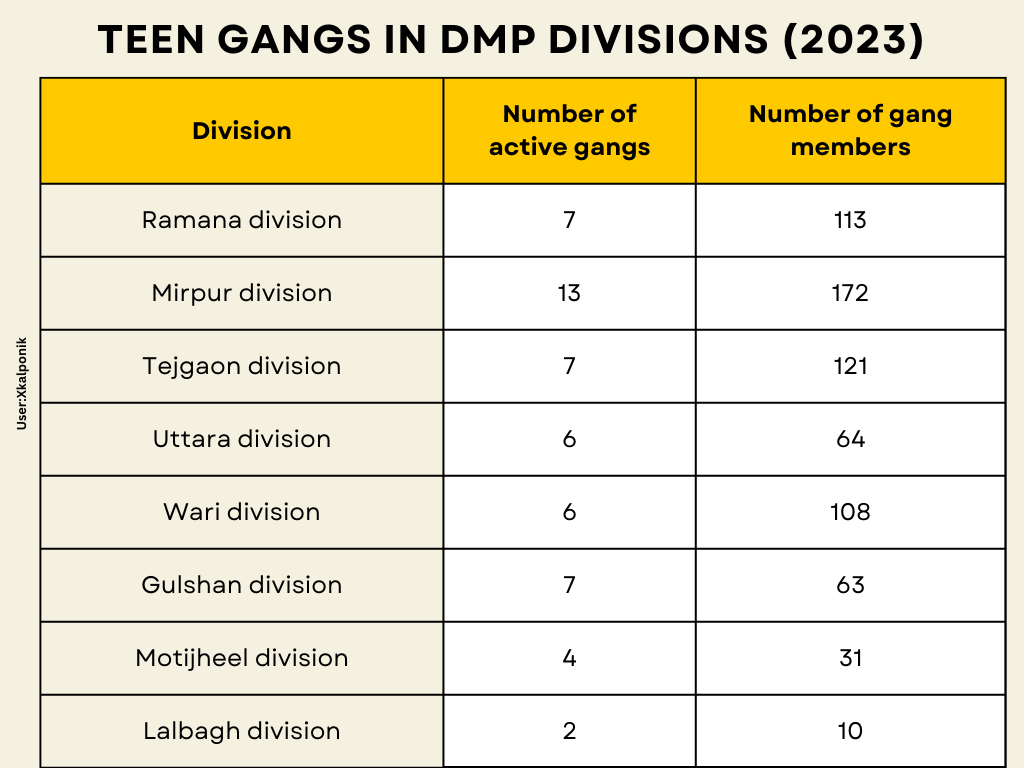
Dhaka Metropolitan Police (DMP) has drawn a list of the active teenage criminal gangs in the capital of Bangladesh, Dhaka. As of June 2023, there were 52 gangs on the list with 682 identified members in total, in 33 thanas (police station areas) under eight crime divisions of DMP.

Teen gangs in Bangladesh are involved in a broad range of criminal activities, encompassing drug trafficking, extortion, theft, robbery, and acts of violence. Street fights with rival gangs are a common occurrence, with these altercations occasionally escalating into severe confrontations resulting in injuries and fatalities. Additionally, these gangs engage in acts of vandalism, which disrupt public order and instill fear in the communities in which they operate.

== Recruitment and influences ==
Recruitment into teen gangs in Bangladesh often takes place through social networks, schools, and disadvantaged neighborhoods. According to experts, vulnerable teenagers, facing social exclusion, neglect, or a lack of positive role models, are more susceptible to gang involvement. The allure of power, protection, and a sense of belonging within the gang contributes to their recruitment. External influences, such as media, movies, and music that glorify gang culture, also play a role in attracting young individuals to join these groups.

== Social impact ==
Research demonstrates that teen gang culture in Bangladesh has significant social, economic, and psychological impacts on society. The proliferation of these gangs has led to increased crime rates, particularly in urban areas. Innocent civilians, including bystanders, often fall victim to gang violence. The presence of teen gangs creates an atmosphere of fear and insecurity, impeding the overall development and well-being of affected communities.

== Government and community responses ==
Recognizing the threat posed by teen gangs, the government of Bangladesh has undertaken measures to address the issue. Law enforcement agencies have intensified efforts to crack down on gang-related activities and apprehend those involved in criminal acts. However, the effectiveness of these measures is often hindered by resource constraints and the complexity of the issue.

Community-based initiatives have also been implemented to divert at-risk youth away from gang involvement. These initiatives encompass outreach programs, vocational training, and counseling services. Non-governmental organizations and civil society groups play a vital role in providing support and rehabilitation to individuals associated with teen gangs.

=== Mass crack-down by RAB ===
The Rapid Action Battalion (RAB) initiated crack-down missions on the Kishor gangs in early 2023. As of February 2024, more than 600 members of more than 60 gangs have been arrested. A mass crack-down operation took place on February 17, 2024, that resulted in around 60 suspected gang members being detained.
