= Asian Development Research Institute =

Think tank in Bihar, India

- Since 1991
- Abbreviation: ADRI
- Headquarters: BSIDC Colony, Off Boring-Patliputra; Road, Patna-800013, Bihar
- Location: Patna, Bihar, India
- Member Secretary: Ashmita Gupta
- Website: www.adriindia.org

The Asian Development Research Institute (ADRI) was established in 1991 as a registered body by a group of social scientists in Patna, Bihar. It focuses on social sciences including economics, politics, development issues, and culture.

== Centre for Economic Policy and Public Finance ==
From the founding of the Institute, it has provided professional support on issues of development strategy or public finance. During 2006-07 and 2007–08, the state government outsourced to the Institute the responsibility of preparing the Annual Economic Survey (AES) for Bihar. In 2008, ADRI established a dedicated centre for the regular preparation of the AES and conduct other research studies related to the economic policy and public finance of the state as well. This centre, called the Centre for Economic Policy and Public Finance (CEPPF) provides research support to the state government for evolving a framework of improved management of public finance. Such research includes studies on resource mobilisation, quality of state government spending, management of deficits and debt, framework of centre-state financial relations, and policies for economic and social development. Besides undertaking such studies, the CEPPF also maintains a Data Bank on the state’s economy. The Centre also organises seminars and workshops on various issues.

== Jan Shikshan Sansthan ==
Keeping in view the growing number of new literates to be covered under the Saakshar Bharat Programme, of which skill development is an integral part, the National Literacy Mission (NLM) supports a number of Jan Shikshan Sansthans (JSS) or Institutes of People’sEducation (IPE) across the country. The Institutes organise vocational and skill development programmes for neo-literates in both rural and urban areas. Through a polyvalent approach, each JSS ensures a continuous access to the need-based vocational training. Since the needs vary, each JSS has the autonomy to design their courses that have flexible content, duration and instructional arrangements. ADRI was entrusted with the responsibility of hosting a JSS in 2000. Every year, about 2,500 persons attend various vocational courses of the JSS, ADRI. At present, besides the main centre on the ADRI premises, JSS runs 12 rural centres in Patna district, some of them in collaboration with local NGOs.

== State Resource Centre for Adult Education ==
The National Literacy Mission (NLM) started an innovative programme for adult educationin 1988. The programme had to be organised in a mission mode, where the active participation of the people and non-government organisations (NGO) was very essential. In this context, the NLM established a number of State Resource Centres (SRC), each of them hosted by a reputed NGO. In 1995, the NLM entrusted ADRI with the responsibility of hosting one such SRC in Patna to support the literacy campaign in selected districts of Bihar, the campaign being supported in the remaining districts of the state by another SRC. In 2000, Bihar was bifurcated and the NLM then entrusted ADRI with the responsibility of organising another SRC at Ranchi to support the campaign in the newly formed state of Jharkhand. Till 2007, the NLM used to be implemented in three phases —Total Literacy Campaign (TLC), Post-Literacy Programme (PLP) and Continuing Education (CE). When nearly all the districts of the country completed the first two phases of the programme and entered the Continuing Education phase, the NLM restructured the programme and named it as Saakshar Bharat programme. The responsibilities of the two SRC's under ADRI include — development of teaching-learning and training materials for literacy programmes; production and dissemination (including translation) of literature for adult education; training literacy functionaries; undertaking motivational and environment-building activities for adult education; multimedia works; running of field programmes; action research, evaluation and monitoring of literacy projects; and undertaking innovative projects to identify the future need of literacy programmes. One of the innovative initiatives of SRC has been to organise the Akshar Bihar and Akshar Jharkhand functions annually to honour dedicated literacy functionaries. The SRC at Patna also organises, along with the Akshar Bihar function, an annual lecture in memory of Myles Horton and Paulo Freire, doyens of adult education.
