= Miriam Adhikari =

South African physician and scientist

- Scientific career
- Fields: Pediatrics, Neonatology, Nephrology
- Institutions: University of KwaZulu-Natal; Nelson Mandela School of Medicine

Miriam Adhikari is a South African physician and scientist specializing in paediatrics with a focus on neonatology. She is Emeritus Professor at the University of KwaZulu-Natal and a neonatologist at the Nelson Mandela School of Medicine. She also has a focus on paediatric nephrology and is a member of the Academy of Science of South Africa. She has a degree from the University of Cape Town and a PhD from the University of Natal.

== Research ==
Adhikari specialises is paediatrics and infectious disease and has co-authored over 100 publications. One area of focus for Adhikari is the management of mothers and babies by nurses.

== Awards ==
She was awarded the Annual Service Excellence Award by the KwaZulu-Natal government in 2017. She said her main focus was to teach the nursing staff the importance of managing the mothers and babies.
