= Crescent Jute Mills =

Jute mill in Bangladesh

Crescent Jute Mill
- Formation: 1956
- Headquarters: Khulna, Bangladesh
- Region served: Bangladesh
- Official language: Bengali

Crescent Jute Mill (Bengali: ক্রিসেন্ট জুট মিলস) was the second largest jute mill in Bangladesh after Adamjee Jute Mills. It was owned by Bangladesh Jute Mills Corporation.

== History ==
Crescent Jute Mill was established in 1956 on 113 acres in Khulna District. It had 1,100 looms imported from James Mackie & Sons. Crescent Secondary School was established for workers of the mill who lived in the workers colony on the premises of the mill. It was established with the support of Pakistan Industrial Development Corporation. It received funding from the Aga Khan IV.

At the end of Bangladesh Liberation War, the Mukti Bahini entered Khulna on 17 December 1971 through the Crescent Jute Mill. Non-Bengali employees of the mill were massacred during the war in the mill during violent confrontations between Bengalis and non-Bengalis. Ferdousi Priyabhashini, a Bengali employee of the mill and a Birangana, was kept in the mill and raped by Pakistan Army for the duration of the war.

In June 2008, workers of Crescent Jute Mill and Star Jute Mills protested outside the factories in Khulna demanding due wages.

Workers at Crescent Jute Mill and eight other jute mills in Khulna went on strike with 11 demands.

In July 2020, the government of Bangladesh closed the jute mill citing operating expenses and losses. The decision was criticized as it came during the COVID-19 pandemic in Bangladesh. At the time of closure there were six thousand workers at the mill. Equipment and goods were stolen from the mill since its closure. Jahangir Kabir Nanak, minister of jute and textile, in May 2024 said the government is exploring reopening closed jute mills including Crescent Jute Mill.
