= Shaibal Gupta =

Indian social scientist (died 2021)

- Born: 1953 or 1954
- Died: 28 January 2021 (aged 67); Patna, Bihar, India
- Occupations: Social scientist and economist
- Notable work: Bihar, Stagnation Or Growth (1987)

Shaibal Gupta (1953/1954 – 28 January 2021) was an Indian social scientist and political economist whose work focused on the economy of the Indian state of Bihar. He was the founder and member-secretary of the Asian Development Research Institute in Patna, Bihar. His research was a contributor to the rollout for various state government led societal development programs and economic reforms in the state.

Gupta received the Padma Shri, India's fourth highest civilian honor, posthumously in 2022.

== Education ==
Gupta's early schooling took place in Sainik School Tilaiya, he later received a Master of Arts in economics in 1977 from Patna University. He went on to complete his PhD in economics in 1981. Post his doctorate, he went on to be a member of the faculty at the A. N. Sinha Institute of Social Studies in Patna.

== Career and research ==
Gupta was the founder and member-secretary of the Asian Development Research Institute in Patna, a non-profit organization focused on social science research established in 1991. He was also the director of the Centre for Economic Policy and Public Finance (CEPPF), which was set up by the government of Bihar as a public finance research institute.

Gupta's research focused on the structure of the Bihar's economy as well as on various development issues in Bihar from a political economy perspective. An economist by profession, he focused on industrial economics, studying the political economy and trying to derive linkages between the capitalist transformation of India and the implied implications on societal growth. He also studied Bihar's industrial sector and compared the political economies of Bihar and Madhya Pradesh, adjacent states, to drive an understanding of the linkage between governance models and growth. His works at ADRI were used by the state of Bihar for the annual economic review as well as for the rollout of various state government led societal development programs. In a statement on his death, Bihar's chief minister Nitish Kumar recounted the contributions made by Gupta for Bihar's economic reforms.

Gupta was a member of the high level Committee for Evolving a Composite Development Index for the States, headed by Raghuram Rajan. Representing Bihar in the committee, Gupta gave his dissent note for the final recommendation report of the committee. Speaking about his dissent, he would later say that the dissent was a technical critique of variables that went into the Index developed by the committee. Specifically, he had advocated for the inclusion of per capita income instead of monthly per capita income and the inclusion of variables like per capita electrical connectivity, infant mortality, and female literacy among other variables. Gupta worked on various research projects with the Institute of Development Studies, Sussex; International Labour Organisation, World Bank and London School of Economics. He held advisory positions in various governmental committees including membership of the Bihar state finance commission, the committee on land acquisition, committee on financial resources, and the Indian government expert group of the planning commission.

Gupta was a director of the Andhra Bank until his term expired in 2011 and Member Executive Committee, of the Indian government's National literacy mission (NLM). As a socio-political commentator, he spoke about various development issues that plagued Bihar. Speaking about the movement of migrant laborers during the COVID-19 induced lockdowns in 2020, he had noted that the crisis was not handled well by the state and had resulted in anger amongst the migrant population.

Gupta received the Padma Shri, India's fourth highest civilian honor, posthumously in 2022.

== Personal life and death ==
Gupta was the son of social worker, medical practitioner and art historian Piyushendu Gupta. The family hailed from Begusarai in Bihar where his father had a medical practice before moving to Patna.

Gupta was married and the couple had a daughter. He died from multiple organ failure on 28 January 2021 in Patna. He was 67. He was cremated with full state honours at Gulbi Ghat in Patna on 29 January 2021.

== Published works ==
- Sharma, Alakh N.; Gupta, Shaibal (1987). Bihar, Stagnation Or Growth. Spectrum Publishing House. ISBN 978-0-8364-2321-1.
- Gupta, Shaibal; Musto, Marcello; Amini, Babak (2019). Karl Marx's Life, Ideas, and Influences: A Critical Examination on the Bicentenary. Springer Nature. doi:10.1007/978-3-030-24815-4. hdl:10315/38569. ISBN 978-3-030-24815-4.
- Gupta, Shaibal (1981). "Non-Development of Bihar: A Case of Retarded Sub-Nationalism". Economic and Political Weekly. 16 (37): 1496–1502. ISSN 0012-9976. JSTOR 4370220.
- Gupta, Shaibal (2001). "New Panchayats and Subaltern Resurgence". Economic and Political Weekly. 36 (29): 2742–2744. ISSN 0012-9976. JSTOR 4410879.
- Gupta, Shaibal (2002). "Subaltern resurgence: a reconnaissance of Panchayat election in Bihar". www.crisisstates.com. Archived from the original on 11 January 2011.
- Gupta, Shaibal (2005). "Socio-Economic Base of Political Dynamics in Madhya Pradesh". Economic and Political Weekly. 40 (48): 5093–5100. ISSN 0012-9976. JSTOR 4417461.
