= Michael Sushil Adhikari =

Bangladeshi politician

State Minister

Personal details
- Political party: Bangladesh Awami League

Michael Sushil Adhikari (1924–1997) was a Christian Bangladesh Awami League politician and the former State Minister.

== Early life ==
He was born on 14 January 1924 in Kathira, Barisal, East Bengal, British Raj. He graduated from Bishnupur Mission School and Brojomohun College.

== Career ==
He was the president of the Bangladesh Baptist Sangha from 1968 to 1997 and Bangladesh Church Council. He was a state minister and afterwards he was a government adviser on NGO Affairs. He collaborated with poet Jibananda Das.

== Death ==
He died on 15 July 1997 in Kolkata, West Bengal, India from cancer.
