= Stranded Pakistanis in Bangladesh =

Urdu-speaking citizens of East Pakistan in Bangladesh awaiting repatriation to Pakistan

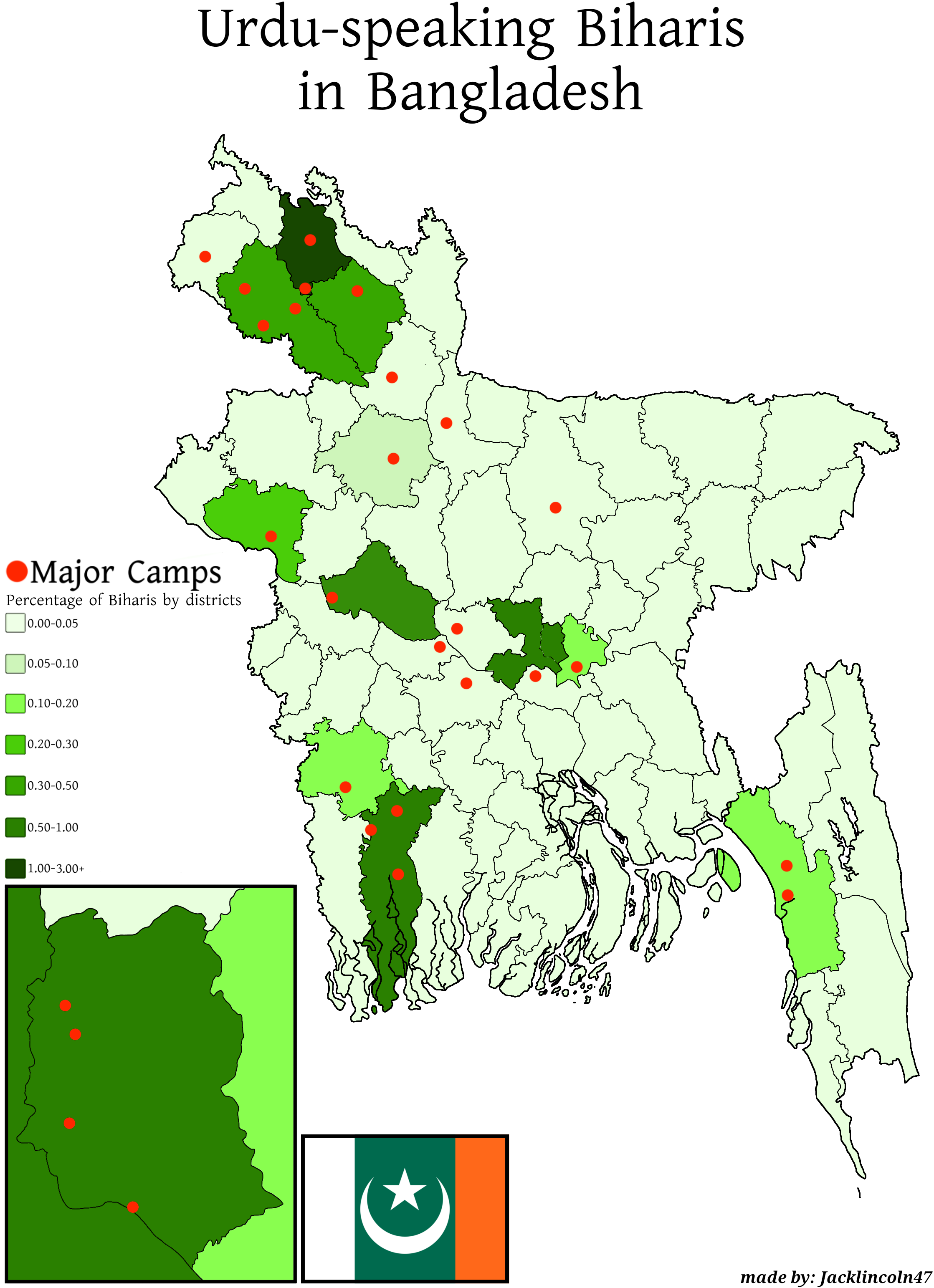
- A map showing the distribution of stranded Pakistani communities in Bangladesh.

Total population
- 300,000–600,000

Regions with significant populations
- Bangladesh

Languages
- Urdu, Bengali

Religion
- Majority; Sunni Islam; Significant minority; Shia Islam

Related ethnic groups
- Muhajirs

Stranded Pakistanis in Bangladesh are Bihari and other Urdu-speaking Muhajirs who emigrated from India and settled in East Pakistan, now Bangladesh, following the partition of India in 1947. Biharis who were minors in 1971 when Bangladesh became independent after the Bangladesh Liberation War, or born later, were stateless until 2008 when a judgement by the Bangladesh High Court gave them right to Bangladeshi citizenship. Though the judgment does not cover refugees who were adults at the time of Bangladesh Liberation War. In March 2015, the Ministry of Foreign Affairs of Pakistan said that more than 170,000 Biharis had been repatriated to Pakistan and the remaining 'stranded Pakistanis' are not its responsibility but rather the responsibility of Bangladesh.

== Background ==
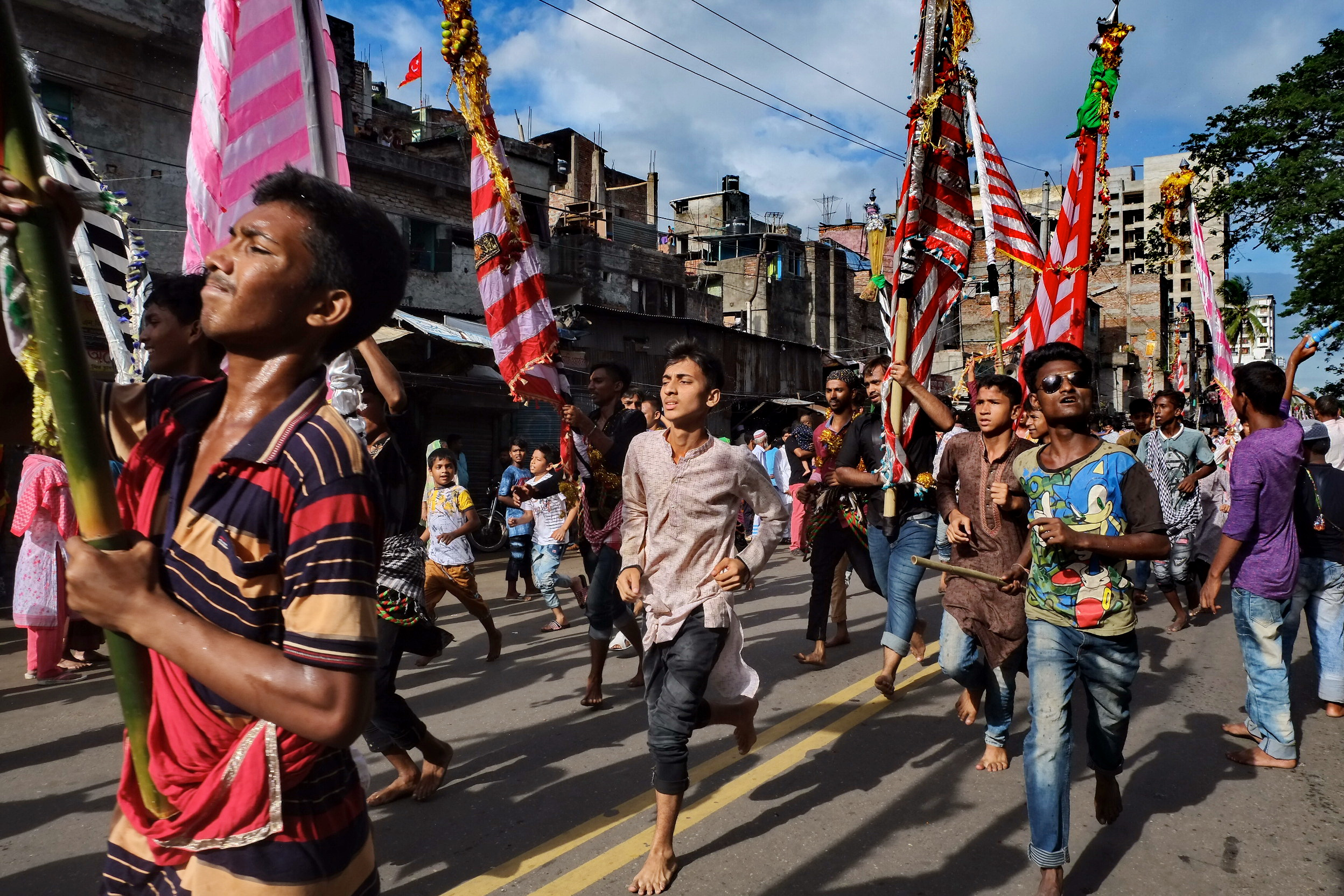
Shia Biharis celebrating Ashura at Geneva Camp, Mohammadpur, Dhaka

Biharis in Bangladesh are mainly Bihari Muslims who originate from Bihar in eastern India, although the "Bihari" identification in Bangladesh can encompass other non-Bengali Urdu-speaking people such as those who settled in what is now Bangladesh in the late 19th century.

In 1971, when the Bangladesh Liberation War broke out between West Pakistan and East Pakistan, most Biharis sided with West Pakistan and opposed the Bengali demand of making Bengali an official language. East Pakistan later became the independent state of Bangladesh. During the war, there were many attacks on the Bihari community as they were seen as symbols of West Pakistani domination. These attacks included rape, murder, and looting.

== Organizations and associations ==
The Stranded Pakistanis General Repatriation Committee (SPGRC), founded in the 1970s by Nasim Khan, is an organization that advocates for the repatriation of Urdu-speaking Bihari Muslims to Pakistan. It is associated with refugee camp communities, including Geneva Camp, and represents approximately 240,000 to 500,000 individuals.

== Refugee and citizenship status ==
Due to their initial pro-Pakistan stance and severe persecution in Bangladesh, the Biharis were consistent in their wish to be repatriated to Pakistan. Initially, 83,000 Biharis (58,000 of whom were former civil servants and military personnel), members of divided families and 25,000 hardship cases were evacuated to Pakistan. The remaining Biharis were left behind as the Pakistan Army and Pakistani civilians evacuated, and they found themselves unwelcome in both countries. The Pakistani government, at the time, was "struggling to accommodate thousands of Afghan refugees". Additionally, the Pakistani government believed that since Bangladesh was still the successor state of East Pakistan, it had to fulfil its duty in absorbing these refugees just as the erstwhile West Pakistan did with the many millions of refugees (incidentally, including some Bengalis) who fled to West Pakistan. Some groups in Pakistan, including the Muttahida Qaumi Movement, have urged the Pakistan government to accept the Biharis. In an agreement in 1974, Pakistan accepted 170,000 Bihari refugees; however, the repatriation process subsequently stalled.

Post-independence Bangladesh scorned the Biharis for supporting the Pakistan Army. With neither country offering citizenship, the Biharis were stateless. Organisations like Refugees International urged the governments of Pakistan and Bangladesh to "grant citizenship to the hundreds of thousands of people who remain without effective nationality".

In 2006, a report estimated between 240,000 and 300,000 Biharis lived in 66 crowded camps in Dhaka and 13 other regions across Bangladesh. In 2003, a case came before a high court in which ten Biharis were awarded citizenship according to the court's interpretation of the constitution. Subsequently, however, little progress was made in expanding that ruling to others. Many Pakistanis and international observers believe the plight of the Biharis has been politicised with political parties giving the refugees false hopes and impractical expectations. In recent years, several court rulings in Bangladesh have awarded citizenship to Biharis living in refugee camps, as the majority of these refugees were born there. International observers believe that Bangladesh, as the successor state, needs to fulfil its international obligations and grant citizenship to this officially stateless ethnic group or arrange for the peaceful repatriation to their native state of Bihar, over the border in India from where they originally hail.

In a visit to Bangladesh in 2002, Pakistani president Pervez Musharraf said while he had every sympathy for the plight of thousands of people in Bangladesh known as 'stranded Pakistanis', he could not allow them to emigrate to Pakistan as Pakistan was in no position to absorb such a large number of refugees. He encouraged his Bengali counterpart not to politicise the issue and accept the refugees as citizens being the successor state of East Pakistan. Pakistani government officials have threatened to deport the more than 1.5 million illegal Bengali refugees living in its country if the issue is not resolved acceptably.

Many Biharis now seek greater civil rights and citizenship in Bangladesh. In May 2003, a High Court ruling in Bangladesh allowed ten Biharis to obtain citizenship and voting rights; the ruling also exposed a generation gap amongst Biharis, with younger Biharis tending to be "elated" with the ruling but with many older people "despair[ing] at the enthusiasm" of the younger generation.

== In popular culture ==
- Of Martyrs and Marigolds, a novel by Aquila Ismail, highlights the atrocities committed by Bengali nationalists against Biharis during the Bangladesh Liberation War.
- In 2007, prominent Bangladeshi filmmaker Tanvir Mokammel made a documentary film titled The Promised Land. The film highlights the current stateless status of Biharis and their despair of not being able to settle in Pakistan, which they see as a betrayal of the Pakistani government.

== See also ==
- Persecution of Biharis in Bangladesh
- 1971 Bangladesh genocide
- Al-Badr (East Pakistan)
- Al-Shams (East Pakistan)
- Bangladesh–Pakistan relations
- Bengalis in Pakistan
- Dhakaiya Urdu
- North Bengal Province
- Bihari diaspora
