= Ethnic relations in India =

Ethnic relations in India have historically been complex. It refers to attitudes and behaviours toward peoples of other ethnicities or races. India is ethnically diverse, with more than 2,000 different ethnic groups. There is also significant diversity within regions, and almost every state and several districts have their own distinct mixture of ethnicities, traditions, and culture. Throughout the history of India, ethnic relations have been both positive (as with mutual cultural influences) and negative (as with discrimination against other ethnicities).

== Public attitudes ==
Usually, people in different regions respect each other's cultures and traditions. According to local sources, unity in diversity has been growing in India, making the country more tolerant.

In 2013, World Values Survey reported 43.5% of Indians responded that they would prefer not to have neighbors of a different race. The most recent survey, however, in 2016, conducted by the World Values Survey, found that 25.6% of the people living in India would not want a person of a different race to be their neighbour.

== Ethnic discrimination among Indian groups ==
=== Racism against North-East Indians in other states of India ===
In recent years, discrimination against people from North-East India has been reported. In 2007, the North East Support Centre & Helpline (NESC&H) was started as a separate wing of All India Christian Council. Its stated goal is to increase awareness regarding prejudice and attacks against people from North-East India. Many North-Eastern Indians face discrimination; are refused living accommodations when they travel to urban areas to study; and are subjected to racial slurs in reference to the appearance of their eyes. A spokesman for the NESC&H has stated that abuse and harassment of North-Easterners is increasing. Instances of discrimination and sexual violence against Northeastern Indians have also been documented, particularly against women migrating to metropolitan areas.

=== Racism in Assam and other North-Eastern States ===
In Assam, there have been many attacks on those from outside the region. In 2007, thousands of Hindi-speaking labourers fled from Assam after a series of massacres and bomb attacks. In May 2007, nine of them were killed and another 20 injured in violent attacks. The next month, 26 people from other parts of India were killed in a series of attacks over a period of six days. The police blamed United Liberation Front of Assam (ULFA) and the Karbi Longri National Liberation Front for the violence. In response, the members of Purvottar Hindustani Sammelan (PHS) staged a hunger strike in Dispur to protest against the "merciless killings of innocent and defenceless Hindi-speaking people." Overall, 98 non-locals were killed in Assam during 2007.

In March and April 2008, a banned Meitei outfit killed 16 non-locals in Manipur. PHS alleged that anti-social groups in Assam were carrying out a continuous hate campaign against the Hindi speakers in the region.

In May 2009, nine Hindi speakers were killed in Assam and Manipur, after the attackers set around 70 houses on fire.

During 8–10 November 2010, 21 Hindi, Bengali, and Nepali speakers were killed by a faction of the NDFB in Assam.

In Meghalaya, the non-indigenous people (who are collectively called Dkhars) are often targets of militant groups.

On 3 May 2023, ethnic violence erupted in India's north-eastern state of Manipur between the Meitei people, a majority that lives in the Imphal Valley, and the Kuki-Zo tribal community from the surrounding hills, resulting in 60,000 people displaced from their homes and hundreds more dead and hospitalized.

=== Racism against Biharis ===
Bihari migrants working to study in India faced severe discrimination. Delhi and Punjab had the highest rates of discrimination against Biharis following Maharastra.

== Racism against foreigners ==
=== Background ===
India has emerged as a growing destination for higher education among students from various African countries owing to a shortage of universities in many African countries, the English medium education provided by many Indian universities and the relative affordability of higher education in India as compared to developed countries of the West. In addition the Indian government has launched programmes such as "Study in India" to promote more African International students to study in India, and announced 50,000 scholarships for African students over a period of 5 years in 2016. In 2014 there were over 10,000 African students in India, mostly of Sudanese, Nigerian, and Kenyan origin. These African students face widespread discrimination from their Indian peers, threat of violence, workplace discrimination with them getting a lower pay and struggling to find part-time jobs despite the rules making internships mandatory, and many face difficulty finding housing and have to pay far higher for it than native residents.

=== Violence and discrimination ===
Incidents of violence against African students in North, South and West India are widespread with some being widely covered by local, national and international media. These include the murder of a 29 year old Congolese national, Masonda Ketada Olivier, in May 2016, who was beaten to death by 3 men in South Delhi over a fight about hiring an auto rickshaw. This incident triggered widespread condemnation from African students in India, the African Heads of Mission in New Delhi, along with local backlash against Indian minorities in the Congo.

In March 2015, four men from the Ivory Coast were assaulted by a mob in the city of Bangalore. In 2020, in Uttarakhand's Roorkee Institute of Technology, 2 African students, Ibrahim a Nigerian-Guinean and Benjamin a Ghanaian were attacked by a group of security guards, with Ibrahim being dragged from the second to the ground floor and Benjamin being hit by bamboo sticks. This incident led to the arrest of the Director of the institution along with 7 other individuals.

Following incidents of violence, the Delhi police in 2017 created a special helpline for Africans residing in the National Capital Region as part of their outreach program to assure them of their safety and security.

African students in North, South and West India are stereotyped as drug dealers, prostitutes, or even cannibals. In one incident in Greater Noida in 2017, the African students in the city faced violence and hostility following the death of Manish Khari, a class 12 student. The locals suspected the students of cannibalism and blamed them for his death, police arrested 5 students following local pressure, however released them subsequently as no evidence was found against them. The police had to request the students to stay indoors until their safety could be guaranteed and made arrests for the racial violence, however the local unit of the BJP and Hindu Yuva Vahini petitioned the police to stop making any further arrests among those booked for the incidents.

=== Causes ===
The racist attitude of many Indians towards Africans has been attributed to the widespread ignorance about the continent in the country, with many Indians being unaware of the existence of many African countries and the true extent of the diversity across the continent. Cultural attitudes and differences in clothing and language along with widespread skin colour-based discrimination have also contributed to xenophobic attitudes among many in the country.

=== Discrimination by police and government authorities ===
African students are routine targets of deportation by various police forces in Northern, Southern and Western states due to purported overstaying of their visas. In July 2016, the Bangalore Police prepared a list of 1500 African students who were reported to be overstaying in the country and had no valid visas, and intended to deport them by the month's end. The students however contended that they are forced to overstay owing to bureaucratic hurdles in extending their visas or getting bona fide certificates from their colleges. The Banglore Police sent 14 Africans to a detention center in December 2022 due to them overstaying their visas. The police also further spread the stereotype of African students being drug dealers by conducting routine narcotic searches and handling their deportation through their anti-drugs departments. In January 2023, in Delhi a mob of 150-200 nationals of African countries surrounded and managed to free 2 out of the 3 Nigerian nationals who were going to be deported by the anti-narcotics cell for overstaying their visas.

In 2020, the DGP of Punjab Police issued a circular prohibiting the use of racial terms in official records, after the Punjab and Haryana High Court took objection to the use of the term "negro" in the records and ordered the DGP to sensitize police officers about racial issues to prevent the use of such terms in official records.

In 2014, the then Law Minister of the Delhi government, Somnath Bharati conducted a midnight raid on the homes of African nationals living in Khirki Extension in South Delhi. The raids were conducted over alleged drug and sex trafficking, following the raids 100 out of the 300 students residing there left the locality.

== See also ==
- 1991 anti-Tamil violence in Karnataka
- 2008 attacks on Uttar Pradeshi and Bihari migrants in Maharashtra
- 2023-2025 Manipur violence
- Anti-Muslim sentiment
- Anti-Bihari sentiment
- Caste system in India
- Communalism (South Asia)
- Human rights in India
- Nido Taniam
