= Biharis =

Demonym for the inhabitants of Bihar, India

Bihari is a demonym given to the inhabitants of the Indian state of Bihar. Bihari people can be separated into three main Indo-Aryan ethnolinguistic groups: Bhojpuris, Maithils and Magahis. They are also further divided into a variety of hereditary caste groups. In Bihar today, the Bihari identity is seen as secondary to caste/clan, linguistic and religious identity but nonetheless is a subset of the larger Indian identity. Biharis can be found throughout India, and in the neighbouring countries of Nepal, Pakistan and Bangladesh. During the Partition of India in 1947, many Bihari Muslims migrated to East Bengal (renamed to East Pakistan; later became Bangladesh). Bihari people are also well represented in the Muhajir people of Pakistan (formerly West Pakistan) because of Partition.

== History ==
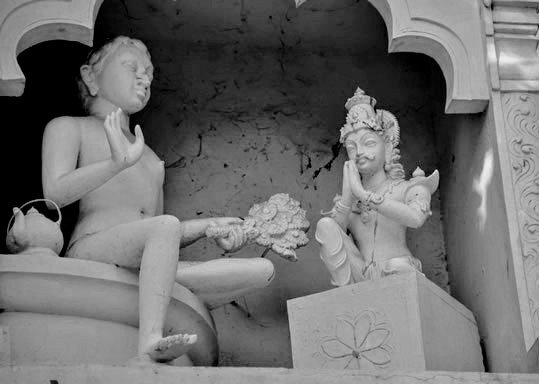
Chandragupta Maurya, the founder of Mauryan Empire with Jain monk Bhadrabahu.

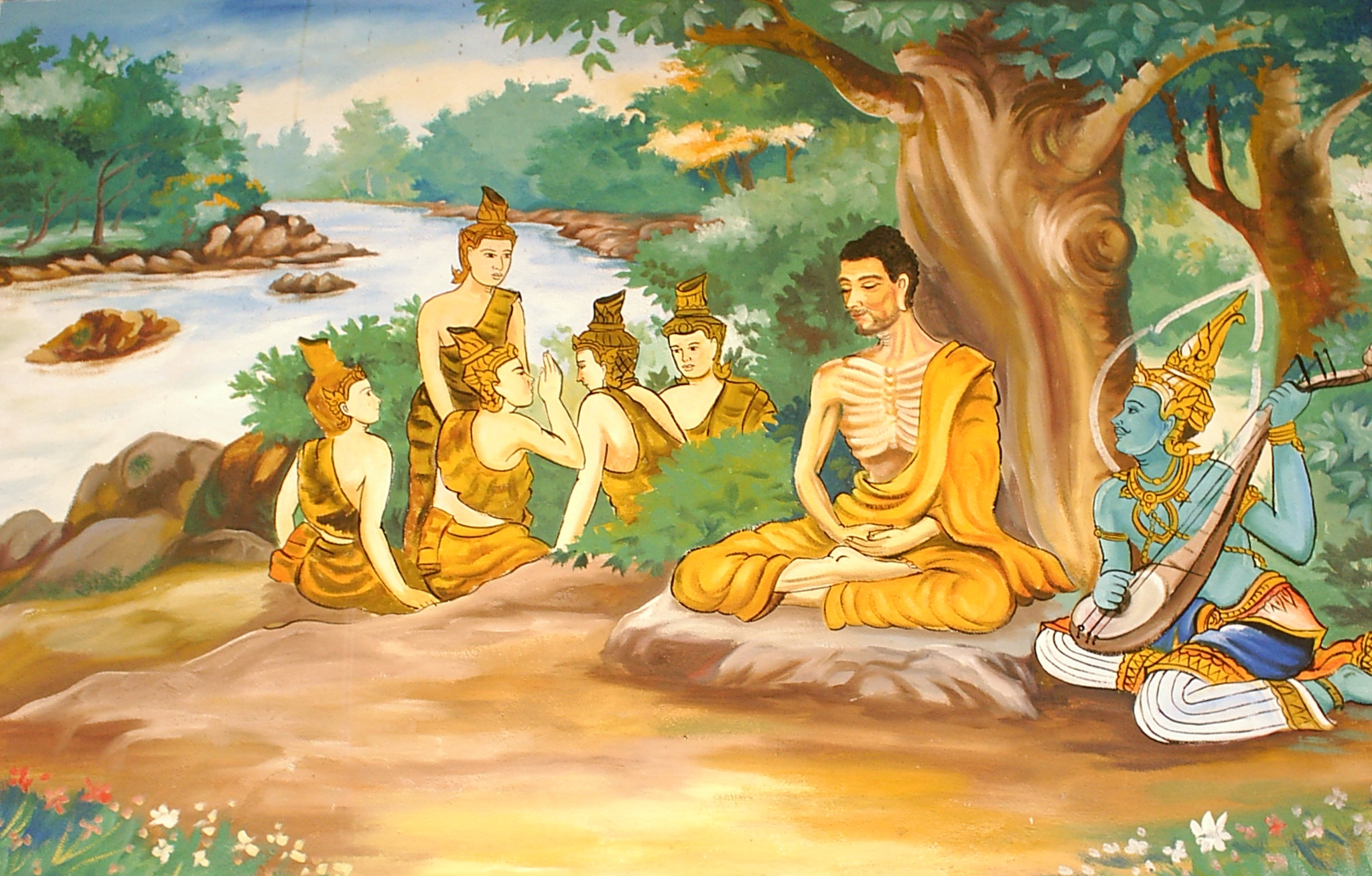
Gautama Buddha undertaking extreme ascetic practices before his enlightenment under the Bodhi tree, on the bank of river Phalgu in Bodh Gaya, Bihar

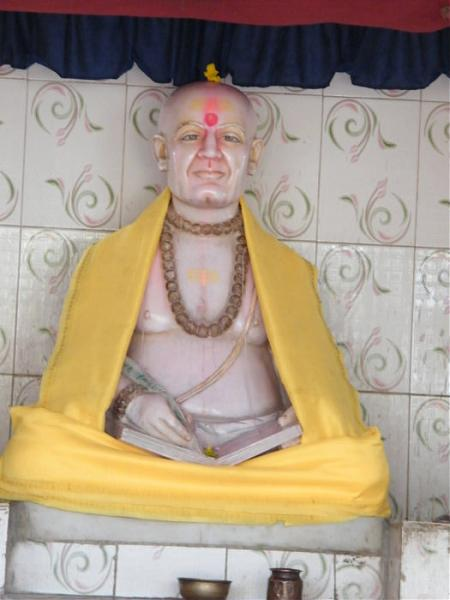
11th-century Hindu philosopher Udayana

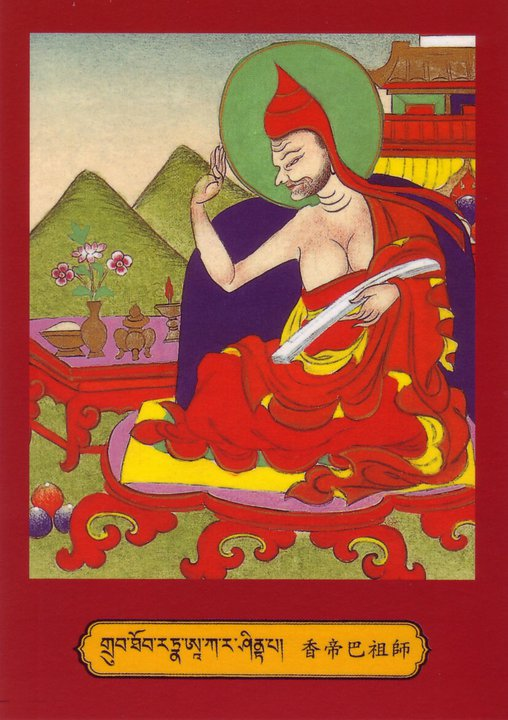
11th-century Vajrayana Buddhist philosopher, Ratnākaraśānti

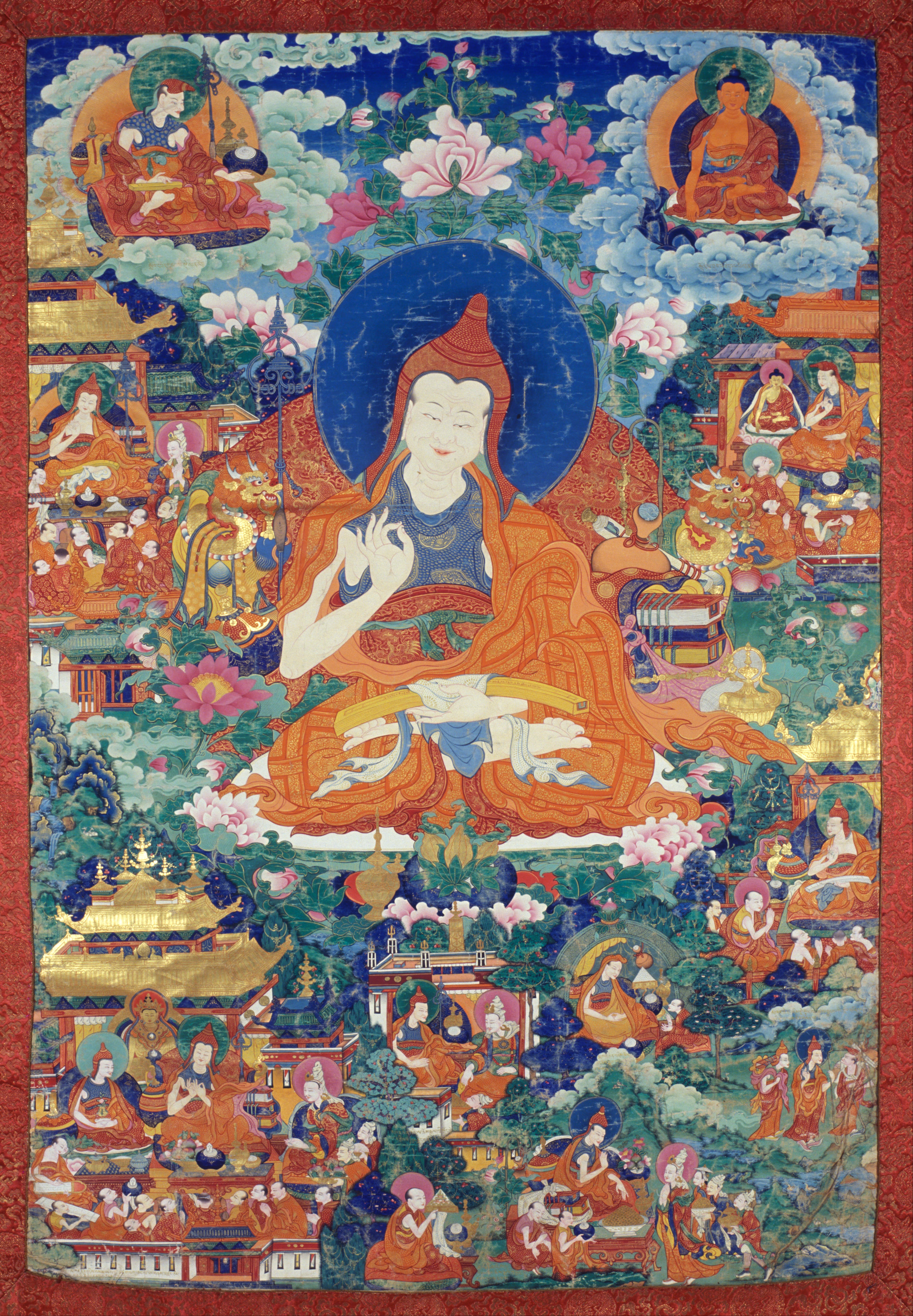
8th-century Buddhist Abbot of Nalanda, Śāntarakṣita

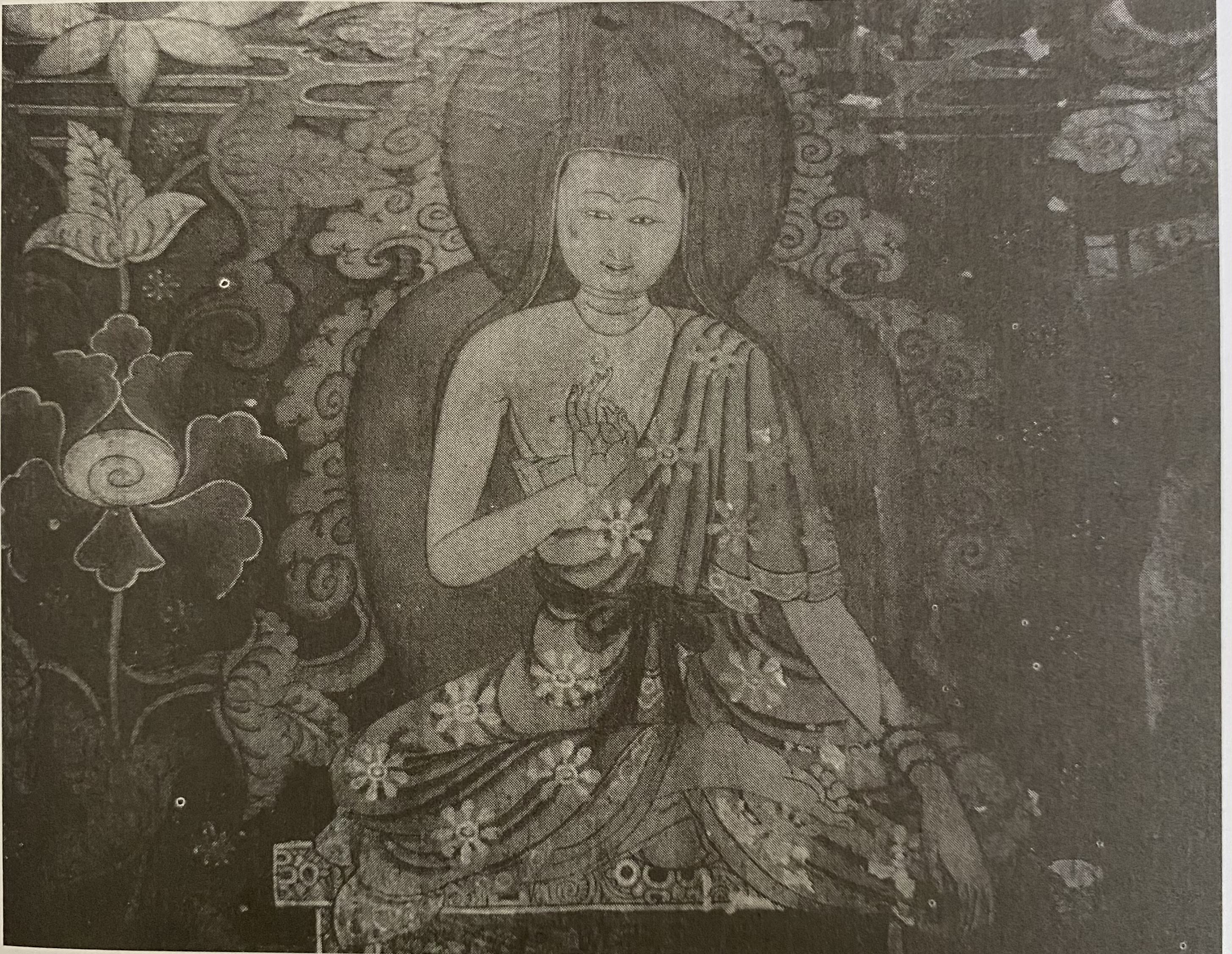
The last head priest of the Mahabodhi Temple in Bodh Gaya in the 15th-century, Śāriputra

Bihar is one of the longest inhabited places in the world with a history going back to the Neolithic age. Since that time, Biharis have long been involved in some of the most important events in South Asian history. Biharis were the founders of many great empires based out of Magadh including the Nanda Empire, Maurya Empire and the Gupta Empire. All of these empires had their capitals in Pataliputra (modern-day Patna). Two of India's major religions also have their origins in Bihar. Gautama Buddha who was the founder of Buddhism, achieved enlightenment in Bodh Gaya, Bihar. Mahavira, the founder of Jainism, was born in Vaishali in North Bihar.

Bihar is home to two UNESCO World Heritage Sites, the Mahabodhi Temple at Bodh Gaya where the Buddha attained nirvana and the Buddhist monastic university of Nalanda. Until at least the 13th century, there was still a significant number of Buddhists in Bihar who mainly followed the Mahayana and Vajrayana schools until they were assimilated into Hinduism. However many village temples still retain idols of the Buddha and Bodhisattvas. Many famous Buddhist and Hindu philosophers and scholars have originated or studied in Bihar during the period from the 5th to 13th century at institutions like Nalanda and Vikramashila including Kamalaśīla, Ratnākaraśānti, Śāntarakṣita, Abhayakaragupta, Udayana and Gaṅgeśa.

Various native kingdoms also flourished in Bihar during the medieval period including the Later Gupta dynasty, Karnats of Mithila, Pithipatis of Bodh Gaya and the Khayaravala dynasty.

The founder of Sur Empire, Sher Shah Suri was born in Sasaram, a city in the state of Bihar in present-day India into a Pashtun family. During the period of Islamic rule, much of Bihar was under the sway of local Zamindars or chieftains who maintained their own armies and territories. These chieftains retained much of their power until the arrival of the British East India Company.

== Martial tradition ==
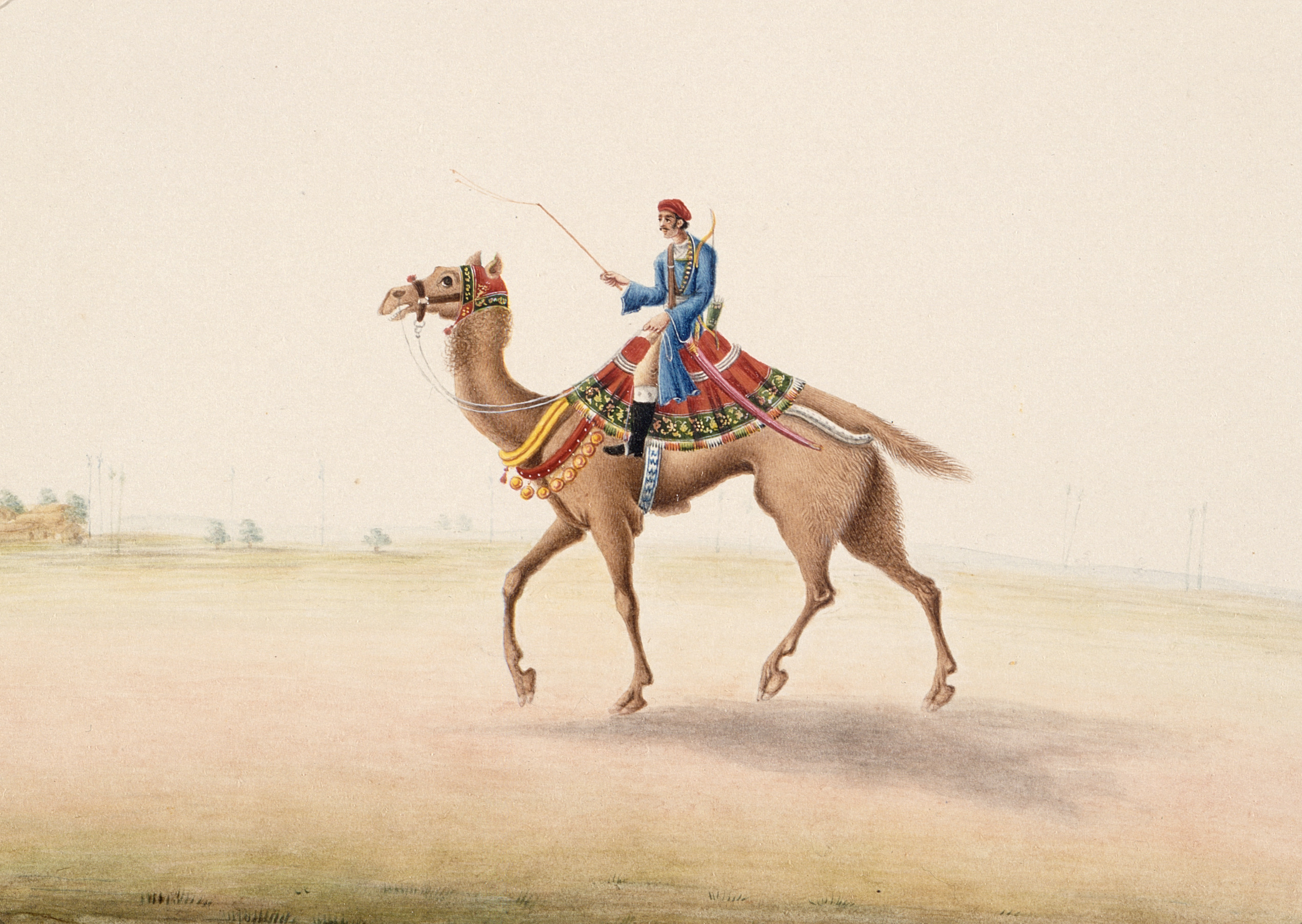
A Purbiya camel rider in Bihar, India in 1825.

Many academics including Dirk Kolff and Walter Hauser have noted that Bihar has a history of armed activism among its peasantry. For centuries, Purbiya soldiers from Western Bihar have long served as soldiers in the armies of Kings in Western regions of India. Mughal sources also record that many peasant soldiers were recruited from Northern parts of Bihar (Tirhut).

In late nineteenth and early twentieth century, the middle peasant castes like Koeri, Kurmi, Paswan and Yadav also got recruited into the British Indian Army as soldiers. According to William Pinch, after 1898, the social resurgence and claim for higher status in the social hierarchy attracted the peasant communities towards the military service.

The Bihari Soldiers of British army played a major role in the Indian Rebellion of 1857 against the British following the suppression of the uprising, British authorities decided not to recruit troops from Bihar. Then they decided to recruit troops from Sikh and Muslim Communities of the Punjab. This martial heritage continued into the late 20th century with the formation of private armies or senas that were formed to maintain the interests of specific castes.

Servan-Schreiber described this martial tradition as follows:

For any traveler on the roads of Bihar, an inescapable image comes to mind. That of a peasant who always keeps his wooden club or lathi at hand, under no circumstances letting it out of his reach. The Biharis, who constitute a martial race in India similar to the Sikhs or the Pathans, in keeping with the role conceived by the British colonial administration, were a mother lode for Monghol and English army recruiters. Their independent fighting spirit, which has earned them a reputation for toughness, has been in evidence throughout their history.

== Clothing ==
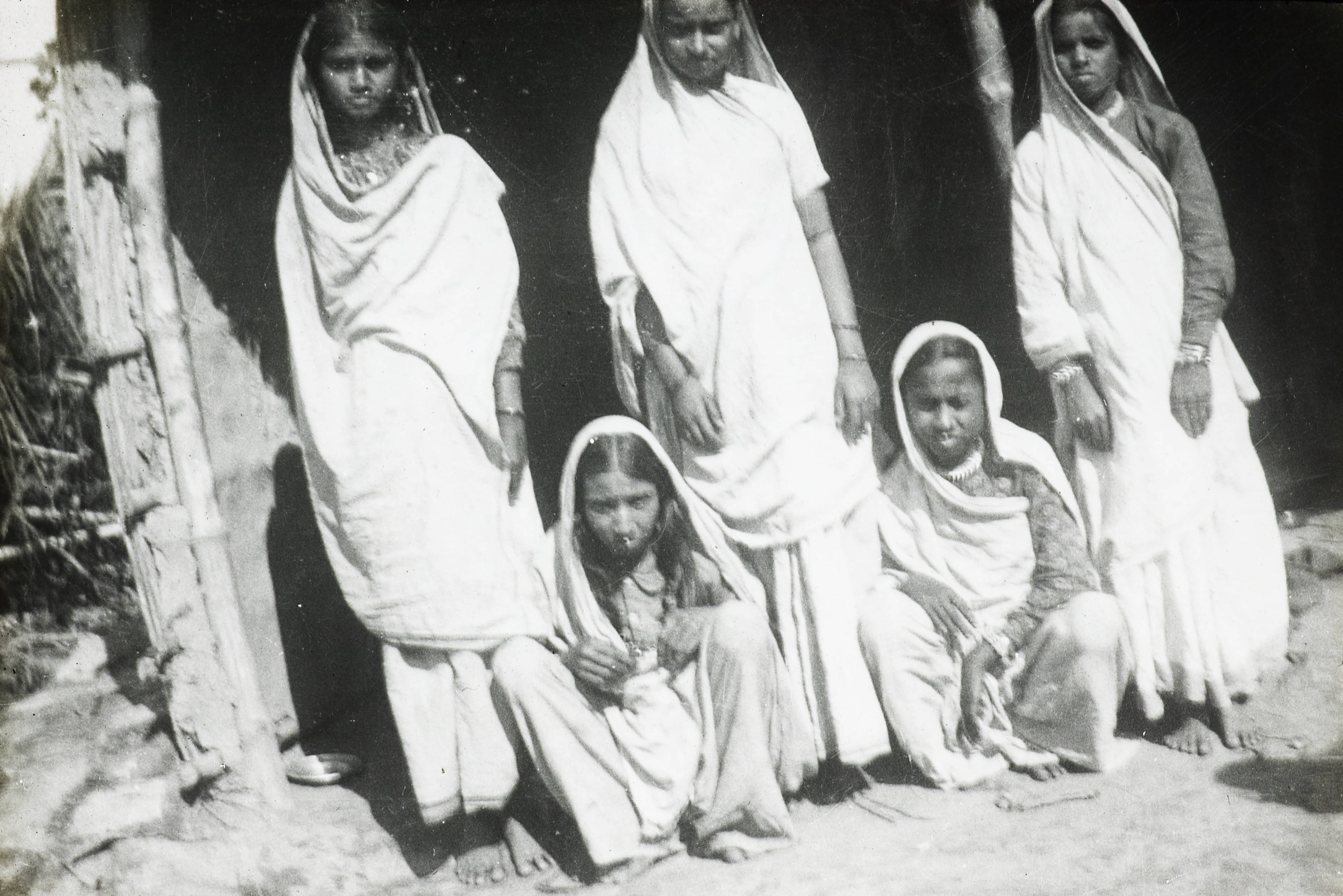
A group of High caste Bihari women in Gopalganj district (1915)

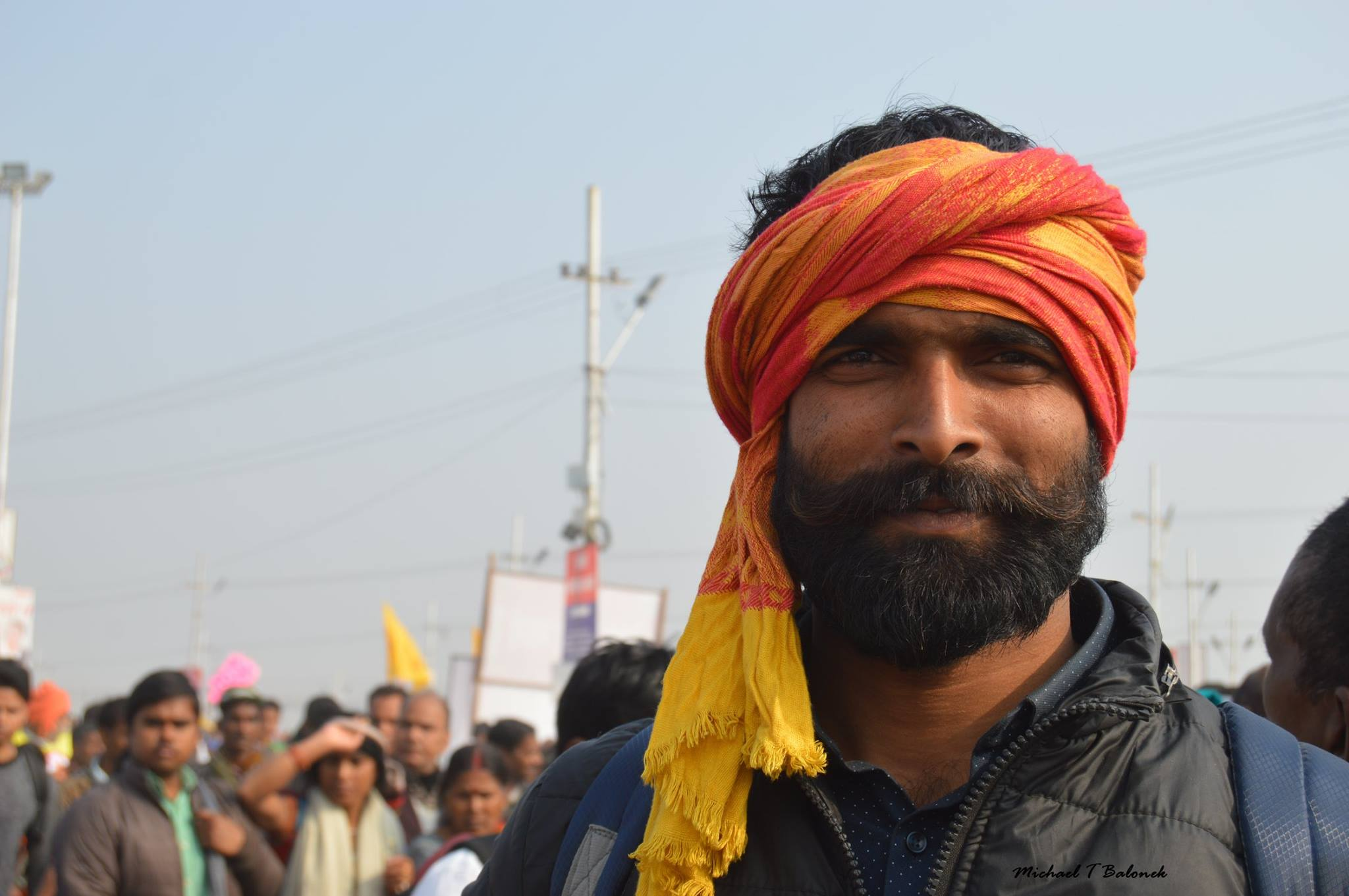
A man from Bihar, attending Kumbh Mela.

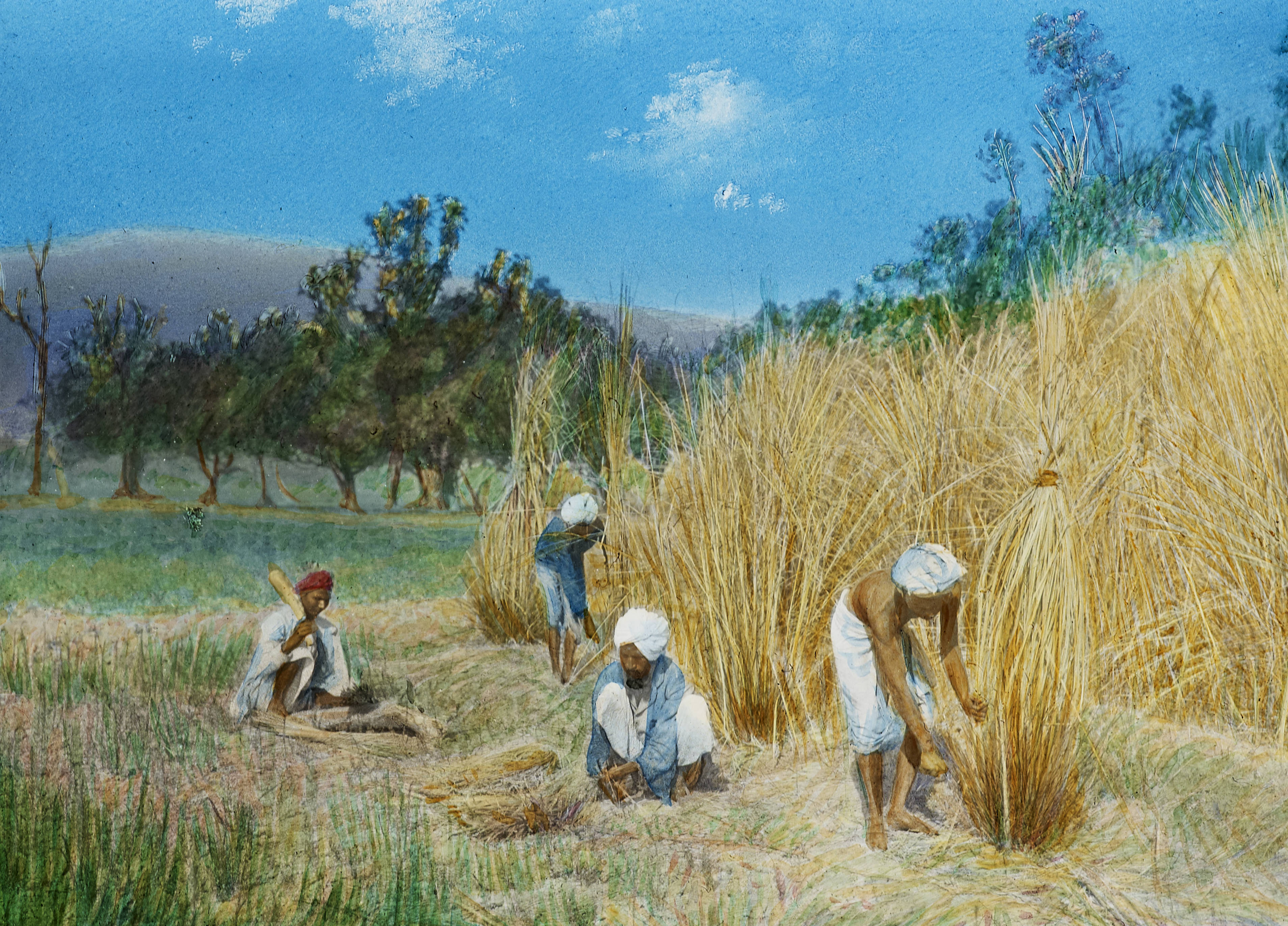
Agriculture workers in Gopalganj, ca. 1915.

The traditional dress of Bihari people includes Dhoti and Chapkan (Angarkha) or Kurta (replacing the older chapkan which is a robe fastened on the right or on the left) for men and Saree for women. In rural Bihar, men also wear a sort of plaid called Gamchha, which is often tied around the head as turban or headscarf and sometimes thrown round the body or over the shoulders. In everyday life women wear saree or Salwar kameez. The saree is worn in "Seedha Aanchal" style traditionally. Nevertheless, Western shirts and trousers are becoming popular among both the rural and urban male population. And Salwar-Kameez for women in urban Bihar. Jewellery such as rings for men and bangles for women are popular. However, there are some traditional Bihari jewelries like "Chhara", "Hansuli", "Kamarbandh","Tika", "Nathiya", "Bichhiya", "Dholna", "Patwasi", "Panjeb", "Matarmala" ," etc.

== Language and literature ==
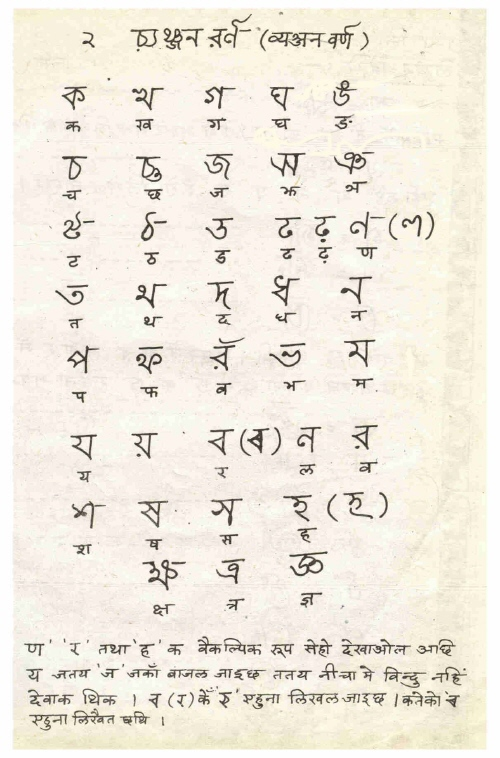
Maithili language in Tirhuta and Devanagari scripts

Hindi is the official language of the State. Maithili (61 million speakers including Bajjika dialect which has 11 million speakers in India), and Urdu are other recognised languages of the state. Unrecognised languages of the state are Bhojpuri (60 million), Angika (30 million) and Magahi (20 million). Bhojpuri and Magahi are sociolinguistically a part of the Hindi Belt languages fold, thus they were not granted official status in the state.The number of speakers of the Bihari languages is difficult to count because of unreliable sources. In the urban region, most educated speakers of the language name Hindi as their language because this is what they use in formal contexts and believe it to be the appropriate response because of unawareness. The uneducated and the rural population of the region regards Hindi as the generic name for their language.

Despite the large number of speakers of Bihari languages, they have not been constitutionally recognized in India, except Maithili which is recognised under the Eighth Schedule of the Constitution of India. Hindi is the language used for educational and official matters in Bihar. These languages was legally absorbed under the subordinate label of Hindi in the 1961 Census. Such state and national politics are creating conditions for language endangerment. The first success for spreading Hindi occurred in Bihar in 1881, when Hindi displaced Urdu as the sole official language of the province. In this struggle between competing Hindi and Urdu, the potential claims of the three large mother tongues in the region – Bhojpuri, Maithili and Magahi were ignored. After independence Hindi was again given the sole official status through the Bihar Official Language Act, 1950. Urdu became the second official language in the undivided State of Bihar on 16 August 1989. Bihar also produced several eminent Urdu writers including Sulaiman Nadvi, Manazir Ahsan Gilani, Abdul Qavi Desnavi, Paigham Afaqui, Jabir Husain, Sohail Azimabadi, Hussain Ul Haque, Shamim Hashimi, and Wahab Ashrafi, among others.

Bihar has produced a number of writers of Hindi, including Raja Radhika Raman Singh, Shiva Pujan Sahay, Divakar Prasad Vidyarthy, Ramdhari Singh 'Dinkar', Ram Briksh Benipuri, Phanishwar Nath 'Renu', Gopal Singh "Nepali" and Baba Nagarjun. Mahapandit Rahul Sankrityayan, the great writer and Buddhist scholar, was born in U.P. but spent his life in the land of Buddha, i.e., Bihar. Hrishikesh Sulabh and Neeraj Singh (from Ara) are the prominent writer of the new generation. They are short story writer, playwright and theatre critic. Arun Kamal and Aalok Dhanwa are the well-known poets. Different regional languages also have produced some prominent poets and authors. Sharat Chandra Chattopadhyay, who is among the greatest writers in Bengali, resided for some time in Bihar. Upamanyu Chatterjee also hails from Patna in Bihar. Devaki Nandan Khatri, who rose to fame at the beginning of the 20th century on account of his novels such as Chandrakanta and Chandrakanta Santati, was born in Muzaffarpur, Bihar. Vidyapati Thakur is the most renowned poet of Maithili (c. 14–15th century). Satyapal Chandra has written many English bestseller novels and he is one of India's emerging young writer.

== Religion ==
According to the 2011 census, 82.7% of Bihar's population practiced Hinduism, while 16.9% followed Islam.

Religion	Population
Hindu	82.7
Muslim	17.70
Others	0.4

== Caste and ethnic groups ==
Bihari society follows a rigid caste system. The castes of Bihar are divided into Forward Castes, Other Backward Class, Extremely Backward Caste, Schedule Caste and Schedule Tribes. There exists a category among the Schedule Castes called Mahadalit, which was created by the Nitish Kumar government to identify more socio-economic backward groups among the Schedule Castes. In October 2023, Government of Bihar released the report of Bihar caste-based survey 2022, it conducted in the same year. This was the first caste census to be conducted after Indian independence. The data published provided an insight into demographic detail of various caste groups of the state. It was found in this report that Other Backward Class and Extremely Backward Castes together account for approximately 63% of the population of the state of Bihar. The detailed data of the census report titled Bihar me jati adharit janganana (caste based census in Bihar) reveals that the Other Backward Class (OBC) population in the State is 27.1286% while, the Extremely Backward Class (EBC) comprises 36.0148%. The Scheduled Caste population in Bihar is at 19.6518% while the Scheduled Tribe population is 1.6824%. The General Caste also called Forward Castes are 15.5224% of the total population of the state.

Caste Groups of Bihar
Caste Groups	Population (%)
OBC	27.12%
EBC	36.01%
Dalits(SCs)	19.65%
Forward caste	15.52%
Adivasis(STs)	1.68%

The total population of the state was approximately 130 million. The largest social category of Extremely Backward Castes in Bihar comprise nearly 130 castes, which historically worked as service providers for other caste groups. In the local political context, they are termed as Pachpania. The prominent castes of this category are Nai (barbers), Mallaah, the fishermen (bearing surnames of Sahani, Nishad and Kewat), Lohar (blacksmiths), Teli (traditionally worked as oil pressers) and Nonia (traditionally they made salt).

Among the other prominent caste groups of the state, the Yadavs comprised 14.26% of the surveyed population, while Kushwaha and Kurmi formed 4.27% and 2.87% of the population respectively. These three caste were part of Other Backward Class category in the state, which is different from the Extremely Backward Castes, who are considered more socio-economic backward group. Among the General Castes, Brahmins were recorded to be 3.66 per cent, while the Kayasthas were recorded to be 0.60 per cent of the total population. The Bhumihars constituted 2.86 per cent of the total population. The Rajputs were 3.45% of the surveyed population in this census report.

Caste	Population	Percentage
Yadav	18,650,119	14.2666%
Kushwaha (Koeri)	5,506,113	4.212%
Kurmi	3,762,969	2.8785%
Brahmin	4,781,280	3.6575%
Teli	3,677,491	2.8131%
Mallah (Nishad)	3,410,093	2.6086%
Nonia	2,498,474	1.9112%
Kanu	2,892,761	2.2129%
Bania	3,026,912	2.3155%
Bhumihar	3,750,886	2.8693%
Rajput	4,510,733	3.4505%
Dushadh	6,943,000	5.3111%
Musahar	4,035,787	3.0872%
Kayastha	785,771	0.6011%
Ravidas	6,869,664	5.255%

== Bihari cuisine ==
Notable local foods of Bihar include Dal Pitha, Litti Chokha, Chana Ghugni, Reshmi Kabab, Kadhi Bari, Puri Sabzi, Malpua, Sattu Paratha, Doodh Pitha, Bajka, Kopal/Arikanchan ki Sabzi and many kinds of veggies etc. The famous sweets include Imarti, Laung Lata, Parwal ki Mithai, Khowa Lai, Tilkut, Anarsa, Khaja, Laktho, Gulgula etc.

== Bihari politics ==
The politics of Bihar is influenced by caste and religion based consciousness to a large extent. The upper castes dominated the politics and political parties till 1967. But after 1967, the resurgence of middle castes took place and the castes like Koeri, Yadav and Kurmi replaced the upper castes, becoming the new political elites of the state . Some Dalit caste like Paswan and Chamar also performed well in politics, Bhola Paswan Shastri and Ram Sundar Das were former Chief Ministers from respective caste and Jagjivan Ram became Deputy Prime Minister and first Labour Minister of India. Since 1990, the Politics of Bihar is dominated by regional political parties like Janata Dal (United) and Rashtriya Janata Dal, while a number of small parties like Rashtriya Jan Jan Party, Plural party, Rashtriya Lok Janata Dal and Jan Adhikar Party are also active.

== Bihari sub-nationalism ==
In 1923, a special session of the Congress took place in Delhi. During this session, an issue of sitting arrangement came up whereby the delegates from Bihar were not given seats in the front row. Maghfoor Ahmad Ajazi registered his objection to this discriminatory arrangement after which Bihari delegates were also given appropriate seats. His protest was admittedly on the issue of self-respect of the Biharis.

According to social scientist Dr. Shaibal Gupta, the beating of students from Bihar in Mumbai in October 2008 has consolidated Bihari sub-nationalism.

== Diaspora ==
During the Partition of India in 1947, many Bihari Muslims migrated to East Bengal (renamed to East Pakistan; later became Bangladesh). Bihari people are also well represented in the Muhajir people of Pakistan (formerly West Pakistan) because of Partition.

== See also ==
- Anti-Bihari sentiment
- Bihari Mauritians
- List of people from Bihar
- Bihari Muslims
- List of people from Jharkhand
