= Insurgency in Meghalaya =

Frozen armed conflict in Meghalaya

- Part of Insurgency in Northeast India
- Map of Meghalaya
Date	1992–present
Location	Meghalaya
Result	Ongoing (Low level insurgency): Partial demobilization of various groups; Peace talks with rebel groups and violence reduction in the area; No incidents reported causing fatalities since 2019.

Belligerents
India: Indian Armed Forces; CRPF; Border Security Force; SULFA; Supported by: Bangladesh	Khasi Nationalists: HNLC; HPLF (until 2005) Garo Nationalists: ANLA (until 2015); GNLA (until 2018); ANVC (until 2004); ANVC-RM (until 2019); AMEF (until 2015); ATF (until 2015); UALA (until 2021); LAEF (until 2017); PLF-M (until 2010); ANSD (until 2002); ASAK (until 2017); UANF (until 2007) Supported by: ULFA; NDFB (until 2020); NSCN

Commanders and leaders
(India) Droupadi Murmu (President); (India) Jagdeep Dhankhar (Vice President); (India) Narendra Modi (Prime Minister); (India) Amit Shah (Minister of Home Affairs); (India) Subrahmanyam Jaishankar (Ministry of External Affairs); Anish Dayal Singh (Director General); Anil Chauhan (Chief of Defence Staff); Manoj Pande (Chief of the Army Staff); M. V. Suchindra Kumar (Vice Chief of the Army Staff); R. Hari Kumar (Chief of the Naval Staff); Dinesh K Tripathi (Vice Chief of the Naval Staff); Vivek Ram Chaudhari (Chief of the Air Staff); Amar Preet Singh (Vice Chief of the Air Staff); Nitin Agarwal (Director general of police); Rajnath Singh (Minister of Defence); Giridhar Aramane (Defence Secretary); (Bangladesh) Shahabuddin Chuppu (President); (Bangladesh) Sheikh Hasina (Prime Minister); Former: (India) Shankar Dayal Sharma; (India) K. R. Narayanan; (India) A. P. J. Abdul Kalam; (India) Pratibha Patil; (India) Pranab Mukherjee; (India) Ram Nath Kovind; (India) Krishan Kant; (India) Bhairon Singh Shekhawat; (India) Mohammad Hamid Ansari; (India) Venkaiah Naidu; (India) H. D. Deve Gowda; (India) Inder Kumar Gujral; (India) Atal Bihari Vajpayee; (India) Manmohan Singh; Murli Manohar Joshi; Indrajit Gupta; L. K. Advani; Shivraj Patil; P. Chidambaram; Sushilkumar Shinde; Sikander Bakht; Jaswant Singh; Yashwant Sinha; Natwar Singh; S. M. Krishna; Salman Khurshid; Sushma Swaraj; M B Kaushal; M N Sabharwal; Trinath Mishra; S C Chaube; Jyoti Kumar Sinha; S I S Ahmed; V K Joshi; A S Gill; Vikram Srivastava; K. Vijay Kumar; Pranay Sahay; Dilip Trivedi; Prakash Mishra; K. Durga Prasad; R. R. Bhatnagar; Anand Prakash Maheshwari; Kuldiep Singh; Dr.Sujoy Lal Thaosen; Bipin Rawat; Shankar Roychowdhury; Ved Prakash Malik; Sundararajan Padmanabhan; Nirmal Chander Vij; J. J. Singh; Deepak Kapoor; V. K. Singh; Bikram Singh; Dalbir Singh Suhag; Bipin Rawat; Manoj Mukund Naravane; Ved Prakash Malik; Chandra Shekhar; Vijay Oberoi; Nirmal Chander Vij; Shantonu Choudhry; Bhupinder Singh Thakur; S. Pattabhiraman; Deepak Kapoor; Milan Lalitkumar Naidu; Noble Thamburaj; Prabodh Chandra Bhardwaj; Arvinder Singh Lamba; S. K. Singh; Dalbir Singh Suhag; Philip Campose; Man Mohan Singh Rai; Bipin Rawat; Sarath Chand; Devraj Anbu; Manoj Mukund Naravane; Satinder Kumar Saini; Chandi Prasad Mohanty; Manoj Pande; B. S. Raju; Vishnu Bhagwat; Sushil Kumar; Madhvendra Singh; Arun Prakash; Sureesh Mehta; Nirmal Kumar Verma; Devendra Kumar Joshi; Robin K. Dhowan; Sunil Lanba; Karambir Singh; Sushil Kumar; P. J. Jacob; Madhvendra Singh; John Colin De Silva; Arun Prakash; Yashwant Prasad; Venkat Bharathan; Nirmal Kumar Verma; R. P. Suthan; D. K. Dewan; Robin K. Dhowan; Sunil Lanba; Parasurama Naidu Murugesan; Karambir Singh; Ajit Kumar P; G. Ashok Kumar; Satishkumar Namdeo Ghormade; Sanjay Jasjit Singh; Satish Sareen; Anil Yashwant Tipnis; Srinivasapuram Krishnaswamy; Shashindra Pal Tyagi; Fali Homi Major; Pradeep Vasant Naik; Norman Anil Kumar Browne; Arup Raha; Birender Singh Dhanoa; R. K. S. Bhadauria; Trevor Raymond Joseph Osman; Anil Yashwant Tipnis; Prithvi Singh Brar; Vinod Patney; Srinivasapuram Krishnaswamy; Satish Govind Inamdar; Michael McMahon; Sunil Kumar Malik; Ajit Bhavnani; B. N. Gokhale; Pradeep Vasant Naik; Pranab Kumar Barbora; Norman Anil Kumar Browne; Krishan Kumar Nohwar; Dinesh Chandra Kumaria; Arup Raha; Ravi Kant Sharma; Birender Singh Dhanoa; Shirish Baban Deo; Anil Khosla; R. K. S. Bhadauria; Harjit Singh Arora; Vivek Ram Chaudhari; Sandeep Singh; A.K. Tandon; E. N. Rammohan; Gurbachan Singh Jagat; Ajay Raj Sharma; Ranjit Shekhar Mooshahary; A.K. Mitra; M.L. Kumawat; Raman Srivastava; U.K. Bansal; Subhash Joshi; D.K. Pathak; K.K. Sharma; Rajni Kant Mishra; V.K. Johri; Surjeet Singh Deswal; Rakesh Asthana; Pankaj Kumar Singh; Sujoy Lal Thaosen; Pramod Mahajan; Mulayam Singh Yadav; George Fernandes; Jaswant Singh; A. K. Antony; Arun Jaitley; Manohar Parrikar; Nirmala Sitharaman; T. K. Banerjee; Ajit Kumar; T. R. Prasad; Yogendra Narain; Subir Dutta; Ajay Prasad; Ajai Vikram Singh; Shekhar Dutt; Vijay Singh; Pradeep Kumar; Shashi Kant Sharma; R. K. Mathur; G. Mohan Kumar; Sanjay Mitra; Ajay Kumar; (Bangladesh) Shahabuddin Ahmed; (Bangladesh) Abdur Rahman Biswas; (Bangladesh) Badruddoza Chowdhury; (Bangladesh) Muhammad Jamiruddin Sircar; (Bangladesh) Iajuddin Ahmed; (Bangladesh) Zillur Rahman; (Bangladesh) Mohammad Abdul Hamid; (Bangladesh) Muhammad Habibur Rahman; (Bangladesh) Khaleda Zia; (Bangladesh) Fazlul Haque; (Bangladesh) Fakhruddin Ahmed	Julius Dorphang (HNLC) (POW); William Sangma (ACAK) (POW); Pollendro Marak (PLF-M); Chesterfield Thangkhiew (HNLC) †; Drishti Rajkhowa (ULFA) (surrendered)

Strength
10,000 Police Personnel	20 (HNLC)

Casualties and losses
118 killed	339 killed 588 captured
- 264 civilians killed

The Insurgency in Meghalaya is a frozen armed conflict between India and a number of separatist rebel groups which was taking place in the state of Meghalaya. The Insurgency in Meghalaya is part of the wider Insurgency in Northeast India, and was fueled by demands of the Khasi, Jaintia and Garo people for a separate state.

== Background ==
The state of Meghalaya was separated from the state of Assam in 1971, in order to satisfy the Khasi, Jaintia and Garo for a separate state. The decision was initially praised as an example of successful national integration into the wider Indian state.

This, however, failed to prevent the rise of national consciousness among the local tribal populations. This later led to a direct confrontation between Indian nationalism and the newly created Garo and Khasi nationalisms. A parallel rise of nationalism in the other members of the Seven Sister States further complicated the situation, resulting in occasional clashes between fellow rebel groups.

The state wealth distribution system further fueled the rising separatist movements, as funding is practiced through per capita transfers, which largely benefits the leading ethnic group.

Starting in the 1980s, bands of violent groups began to form in the region, mostly in opposition to the non-tribal Dkhars and their perceived threat to jobs and demographics in the state.

The first militant outfit to emerge in the region was the Hynniewtrep Achik Liberation Council (HALC). It was formed in 1992 by Julius Dorphang, who would become the outfit's chairman, as well as John Kharkrang and Cheristerfield Thangkhiew. It aimed to protect the interests of Meghalaya's indigenous population from the rise of non-tribal ("Dkhar") immigration.

Tensions between Garos and Khasis soon led to a split in the HALC. The Garo dominated Achik Matgrik Liberation Army (AMLA) would splinter off, while Dorphang, Kharkrang, and Thangkhiew would meet to rename the joint Synteng-Khasi alliance left in the HALC to the Hynniewtrep National Liberation Council (HNLC). AMLA passed into obscurity, while Achik National Volunteers Council (ANVC) took its place. The Garo – Khasi drift persisted as HNLC had set up the goal of turning Meghalaya into an exclusively Khasi region, ANVC on the other hand sought out the creation of an independent state in the Garo Hills.

A number of non Meghalayan separatist groups have also operated in the region, including the United Liberation Front of Assam and the National Democratic Front of Bodoland among others.

GNLA had more or less been neutralised in the aftermath of Operation Hill Storm between July 2014 and September 2016.The last killing linked to GNLA was reported on February 24, 2018, when the then 'commander-in-chief' of GNLA, Sohan D. Shira, was killed in an encounter by Meghalaya Police at Dobu A'chakpek in the East Garo Hills District.

After Mass surrender and disbandment of ULFA and NDFB, insurgency in Meghalaya has been finished for good. Most major Garo militants have also either been killed or have surrendered.

== Chronology ==
=== 2000–2010 ===
- 10 August 2001, Five policemen were killed and two others wounded after an ambush by Achik National Volunteer Council (ANVC) militants near Songsak.
- 13 August 2002, A joint ambush against a truck carrying civilians by members of the Achik National Volunteer Council (ANVC), United Liberation Front of Assam and the National Democratic Front of Bodoland (NDFB). The attack left 12 civilians killed and other 20 wounded, near Raksamgiri village, happening this attack one day before the Indian annual celebration of Indian Independence Day.
- On 9 September 2002, ANVC militants kill 6 policemen, after laying an ambush in the vicinity of Chokpot.
- On 26 September 2003, Indian troops kill 8 ANVC militants in two separate encounters, in the West Garo Hills district.
- On 23 July 2004, ANVC signed an extended ceasefire agreement with the Indian government, while maintaining low level activity. A power vacuum created by the ceasefire lead to the creation of several rebel groups, including RIUF, UANF, HULA, HNSRA.
- On 24 July 2007, HNLC chairman Julius Dorphang surrendered to the authorities after abandoning the faction's camp in the Maulvi Bazar district of Bangladesh, four other rebels accompanied Dorphang in his decision.
- On 12 October 2008, policemen shot and killed top PLF-M commander Pollendro Marak, in the aftermath of an encounter in the area of the Boganol village, East Garo Hills.

=== 2010–2020 ===
- 10 December 2010, four GNLA rebels were killed five were detained in a clash with police officers that took place in the East Garo Hills district.
- 5 April 2011, GNLA killed 5 migrant coal miners and injured another in the Goka coal dumping area South Garo Hills district.
- 9 August 2011, 4 GNLA militants were slain, including a senior commander, following a police operation. The events took place in the Bolkengre village, East Khasi Hills district. Months later August 2012, security forces arrested 5 GNLA separatists in Resubelpara, North Garo Hills district, as the militants were extorting money from a local citizen.
- 22 August 2011; SWAT officers were ambushed in Baija area of East Garo Hills, damaging the vehicle where they were transported, but no injuries were reported.
- 8 August 2013, 2 Border Security Force officers were shot dead during an attack in a remote border outpost in Bagli village, Meghalaya. The Achik National Volunteer Council-B (ANVC-B) and the Garo National Liberation Army are pointed out as the probable perpetrators.
- 7 January 2014: A group of officers was attacked by militants in Edenbari, Meghalaya, leaving two officers wounded. The Achik National Volunteer Council-B (ANVC-B) claimed the attack, stating that they carried out the attack because they suspected that the police officers were rivals disguised as police.
- 11 January, Assailants threw an explosive device at an Assam Oil Corporation gas station in the Hawakhana neighborhood, Tura, West Garo Hills district, leaving two cars damaged. The Achik Tiger Force (ATF) claimed the attack, stating that the bombing was intended to send an extortion message. However, authorities blamed the Achik National Volunteer Council-B (ANVC-B) for the incident.
- 18 January, The Garo Hills Deputy Commissioner (DC) Chinmay P. Gotmare, was attacked while traveling in his vehicle with Jaksongram and Adugre villages, Meghalaya. The DC was unharmed to the attack, being the possible responsibles the Garo National Liberation Army (GNLA) or the Achik National Volunteer Council (ANVC).
- 1 February, A former ANLA member was abducted, and has not been found, although police suspect that he has been killed.
- 2 February, Suspected ANVC-B abducted two contractors from the rural electrification project in Sasatgre village, Meghalaya. One of the abducted was killed and the other wounded after an encounter with the suspects.
- 3 February; Suspected ANVC-B militants abduct two civilians in West Garo Hills, Meghalaya. Both victims were killed later that day by their captors. In the same day militants abducted the nephew of a former finance secretary of the Achik National Liberation Army (ANLA) in Wageasi, North Garo Hills district. The victim was killed by the assailants, attributing the murder to the ANLA.
- 1 April, A grenade was thrown (but failed to detonate) near a liquor store and bus station in Williamnagar, East Garo Hills, Authorities attributed the attack to the (ANVC-B). In the next day an assailant in motorcycle attacked again a liquor store, now leaving an employee wounded.
- 2 April, the UALA, ASAK, LAEF, ANLCA and ANCA militant factions united under the name of A'chik Revolutionary Front, the group aims to create a separate Garoland State in the Garo Hills area.
- On 1 May, a GNLA training officer was killed in the aftermath of an army raid on a GNLA camp in the area of Chokpot, IED and communication equipment was also confiscated. A heavily injured UALA cadre was detained in a separate incident.
- On 20 May, in the aftermath of a police raid 5 UALA militants were killed and one policeman was injured, a weaponry cache was also recovered.
- 29–30 June, A shoe trade was abducted by unknown assailants, but authorities suspects of the ANVC-B for the kidnapping. At the next day, a teacher that worked in a secondary school in Dalu was kidnapped, and rescued in July 1st.
- Between 8–17 July, authorities detained 14 ASAK guerillas in the areas of Williamnagar, Soksan and Rongjeng, weapons, SIM cards, ammunition and demand notes were also seized.
- On 28 August, police recovered the bodies of 4 previously kidnapped, civilians, in the Oragitok village, West Garo Hills, Meghalaya.
- On 13 September, a shootout between members of GNLA and AMEF led to the death of 4 GNLA rebels, in the Bolmaram jungle, East Garo Hills.
- 24 September, the heads of the ANVC rebel group and the ANVC Rimpu Marak splinter faction signed a peace accord with the government of Meghalaya. The agreement enhances the autonomy for the Garo Hills Autonomous District and includes financial aid, which will facilitate the socio-economic and educational development of the area. In return the rebels agreed to disband within the period of three months.
- On 22 October, security forces detained 6 ULFA rebels in the village of Pedaldoba, Tikrikilla, Menghalaya, six pistols, two grenades and 20 rounds of ammunition were also confiscated.
- 19 November, an improvised mine blast near an Indian Police Service (IPS) convoy in the village Siju Meghalaya, killing two officers and wounding three others. The Achik National Cooperative Army (ANCA) claimed the attack and stated that was carried out in retaliation to the authorities alleged harassment of the families of ANCA members, and authorities said that the Garo National Liberation Army was responsible of the attack.
- 22 November, An engineer of the National Buildings Construction Corporation was kidnapped by ANVC-B suspects in Rongara village, Meghalaya.
- On 25 November, authorities arrested ACAK commander William A Sangma along with a fellow guerrilla in the Tirupur district of Tamil Nadu.
- 7 December, security forces uncovered an AMEF camp in the village of Papara Abri, East Garo Hills. Approximately 20 militants escaped into the jungle, as police seized explosives, radio sets, pistols and documentation.
- On 18 December, the Indian military killed two UALA fighters in the village of Thanti Pick Hills, Goalpara district, Assam.
- On 16 February 2015, 4 Garo National Liberation Army and 2 ASAK cadres surrendered at an East Garo Hills police station, 5 weapons and over 100 rounds of ammunition were also transferred.
- On 2 March 2015, a bomb blast wounded two petrol pump employees in the West Khasi Hills district, the owner of the pump had previously fallen victim of extortion attempts by GNLA militants.
- On 5 March, 10 members of the AMEF were nabbed in connection with illegal arms trade operations in the West and North Garo Hills.
- On 10 March, a joint ULFA – GNLA ambush resulted in the deaths of 4 policemen in Panda Reserve, Rongara, South Garo Hills, Menghalaya.
- On 18 March, the government of Meghalaya sanctioned the creation of a new counter insurgency battalion, known as Special Force 10, the unit will receive, riot management, jungle and urban warfare training.
- 25 May, An extortionist was apprehended by local residents, while tried to rob a civilian in Ramdenggonggre, West Garo Hills. The assailant as Ramseng R. Sangma, a member of the ANVC-B.
- 31 May, militants thrown a crude bomb and opened fire at a transport weigh bridge in Sarangma village, Meghalaya, leaving four officers of the Central Reserve Police Force and Assistant Sub-Inspector. Officers suspected that the Achik National Cooperative Army (ANCA) was behind the attack.
- 17 November, Two construction workers were kidnapped from Silki village, Meghalaya, being released on November 25. The suspects for the abductions were the Achik National Liberation Army (ANLA) and the Achik Matgrik Elite Force (AMEF).
- January 9, 2016, an explosive device blasts in the Warimong Wine Shop in Williamnagar, Meghalaya, leaving 9 civilians wounded. The Achik Matgrik Army (AMA) claimed responsibility and stated that the shop was targeted for selling alcohol and cigarettes to underage individuals, and authorities attributed the attack to the Garo National Liberation Army. Days later, a suspect of the attack was shot dead during an encounter against security forces.
- 27–30 July 2017, members of the Achik National Cooperative Army (ANCA) began a string of kidnappings in the region.
- 15 January, Seven traders were abducted near Wageasi, One hostage escaped and the remaining six victims were released five days later. The ANLA was suspect of the kidnappings.
- On 18 February 2018, NCP candidate Jonathone N Sangma and his two security guards, and the driver were killed in an IED attack.
- On 24 February 2018, Sohan D Shira, the Chief of Garo National Liberation Army (GNLA) killed in an encounter with Meghalaya Police's task force commando.
