= Hynniewtrep National Liberation Council =

Militant organization

- Leaders: Julius Dorphang (surrendered); Cheristerfield Thangkhiew †; M. Diengdoh; Bobby Marwein
- Headquarters: Moulvibazar, Bangladesh
- Active regions: Meghalaya, India
- Ideology: Khasi-Jaintia interests
- Size: 20 (As of 2025)
- Wars: Insurgency in Northeast India: Insurgency in Meghalaya

The Hynniewtrep National Liberation Council (abbreviated HNLC) is a militant organization operating in Meghalaya, India. It claims to represent the Khasi-Jaintia tribal people, and its aim is to free Meghalaya from the alleged domination of outsiders (the "Dkhars") from the Indian mainland. The Government of India proscribed it on 16 November 2000, but later lifted the ban, before banning it again in 2019.

== History ==
The Meghalaya state was carved out of the Assam state, with an aim to address the unique needs of the major tribes in the region: the Garos, the Jaintias and the Khasis. However, discontent grew among the tribals due to the alleged high-handedness of the security forces, the youth unemployment and the inability to compete with outsiders from mainland Indian businesses. This led to the rise of several insurgent groups in the state.

The origins of HNLC lie in the Hynniewtrep Achik Liberation Council (HALC), the first militant organization in Meghalaya, which claimed to be a representative of the three major tribes of the state. After a split occurred in HALC over tribal differences, the Garo members formed a new outfit called Achik Matgrik Liberation Army (AMLA), while the Khasi and Jaintia members formed the Hynniewtrep National Liberation Council (HNLC) in 1993.

The original HNLC leadership consisted of:

- Julius K. Dorphang, Chairman
- Cheristerfield Thangkhiew, General Secretary
- M. Diengdoh, Publicity Secretary
- Bobby Marwein, Commander-in-Chief

Julius K. Dorphang resigned and surrendered to the Government of India on 24 July 2007, as a result of the internal differences within HNLC.

== Area of operation ==
The HNLC primarily operates in the Khasi Hills region, and has carried out a number of terror activities in Shillong, the capital of Meghalaya. The top HNLC leadership is based in Dhaka, the capital of the neighbouring country Bangladesh. Some of its camps are also located in Bangladesh, mostly in the Chittagong Hill Tracts.

== Activities ==
The State Government and the Meghalaya police have accused HNLC of indulging in a number of illegal activities, including killing, abduction, robbery, arms smuggling, cattle smuggling and extortion in the Jaintia Hills coal belt. It has also been accused of circulating fake currency in the state, supported by the Inter Services Intelligence (ISI) of Pakistan.

HNLC has claimed that it has tried to help the Khasi people and to make the society better. It launched Operation Kyllang (hurricane) to publicly punish rapists by torturing them, and claims to have reduced the crime in the Khasi Hills. It also calls for the boycott of the Indian Independence Day celebrations every year. It is opposed to the civil polls in Meghalaya, alleging that the elections would make the traditional tribal institutions powerless.

== Funding and sourcing of weapons ==
Over the years, HNLC built ties with the other secessionist organizations operating in North-East India, including the National Socialist Council of Nagaland-Isak-Muivah (NSCN-IM), the National Democratic Front of Bodoland (NDFB), the National Liberation Front of Tripura (NLFT) and the United Liberation Front of Asom (ULFA). NSCN provided it moral, physical and financial support in its initial days.

The organization has obtained the Chinese weapons sold by the Wa tribe of Burma. These weapons were brought to the black arms markets in Bandarban and Sylhet of Bangladesh via Manipur and Mizoram, after being picked along the Indo-Myanmar border.

HNLC runs several businesses in Bangladesh, including a stone quarry in Jaflong and several betel nut plantations.

== Decline ==
Several of the HNLC members have surrendered over the years. Julius K Dorphang, the former chairman of the outfit, who surrendered in 2007, claims that "HNLC is nothing now", with only 55 cadres left in Bangladesh as of 2010. He later became a politician, and successfully contested Meghalaya Legislative Assembly elections in 2013.

HNLC has expressed desire to hold political dialogues with the Meghalaya Government, including in August 2010. The Shillong Khasi Jaintia Church Leaders Forum was designated as the official negotiator with HNLC.

As of 2025, the HNLC now only has 20 cadres left with most of them operating from hideouts in Bangladesh and now are desperately trying to recruit new cadres but most of tries are unsuccessful.

== See also ==
- Insurgency in Northeast India
- Seng Khasi Movement
