= Seng Khasi =

Seng Khasi may refer to:

- Seng Khasi Movement, a movement promoting the cultural traditions of the Khasi people
- Seng Khasi College, a college in Meghalaya, India
