= Achik Songna An'pachakgipa Kotok =

ASAK
- Achik Songna An'pachakgipa Kotok
- Leader: Unknown
- Dates active: ~2012–2017
- Active regions: Meghalaya state
- Ideology: Garo nationalism
- Wars: Insurgency in Northeast India, insurgency in Meghalaya

The A’chik Songna An’pachakgipa Kotok (ASAK) was an armed separatist group operating in the northeast Indian state of Meghalaya. The ASAK is a split of the Achik National Volunteer Council, formed nearly 2014.

== History ==
The A’chik Songna An’pachakgipa Kotok (ASAK) start his activities in 2014, after splitting from Achik National Volunteer Council, trying to continue the armed struggle against the Indian state. The ASAK is accused of perpetrating several kidnappings for extortion and recruit minors in Meghalaya.

=== Armed campaign ===
The ASAK is accused of being in conflict with the Garo National Liberation Army, leading to armed confrontations. In 16 June, members of the ASAK abducted and tortured Arvind Kumar, a bank branch manager of the State Bank of India. Kumar was released days later in Rangatari area, Meghalaya. Kidnapping was the most common tactic used by the ASAK. Other notorious kidnappings of the ASAK was the abduction of a teacher that worked at the Dalu Higher Secondary School in Dalu village, a State Bank of India employee, released after 15 days captive. On 25 October 2015,

In April 2015 ASAK members abducted Alladin Sangma from Dambul Aga village, South Garo Hills district, (released until 3 June) abducted another civilian from Garobadha village and kidnapped three traders from Emangre area. On 24 September, two people including an Intelligence Bureau worker, abducted in South Garo Hills district. One month later, the bodies of both were discovered near the border with Bangladesh. During the same year, some members of the ASAK they gave up their weapons and surrendered with the Indian state.

In January 2016 ASAK members tried to abducted 15 traders, which when resisting, the attackers opened fire wounding a trader. Days later, armed ASAK members abducted two people, a bus driver and a conductor, in Silkigre, Meghalaya, in February, authorities discovered and defused a homemade bomb near Chongpotgre area. In March, the ASAK abducted three civilians, (a bus driver, conductor and a handyman) near Boldamgre, Meghalaya. The civilians were released days later. On 29 September, ASAK members kidnapped 9 civilians in Songotagre, Meghalaya. One hostage escaped shortly after the kidnapping while the other eight victims were released in October. On 28 October ten civilians was abducted in Dumnikura, Meghalaya. One civilian was releases at the same day, and the remaining nine were released on 2 November.

On 1 January 2017 armed assailants kidnapped three traders in Dalu, Meghalaya. The 3 hostages were released until 18 January after a ransom was paid. No group claimed responsibility but some sources, sources attributed the attack to Achik Songna An'pachakgipa Kotok (ASAK). Days later, on 22 January, abducted four bus and truck drivers in Kolapara. On 14 February, ASAK members kidnapped seven workers at a quarry in Sangkini Dapgre, Meghalaya, being released four days later.
