= Sasatgre =

- Village
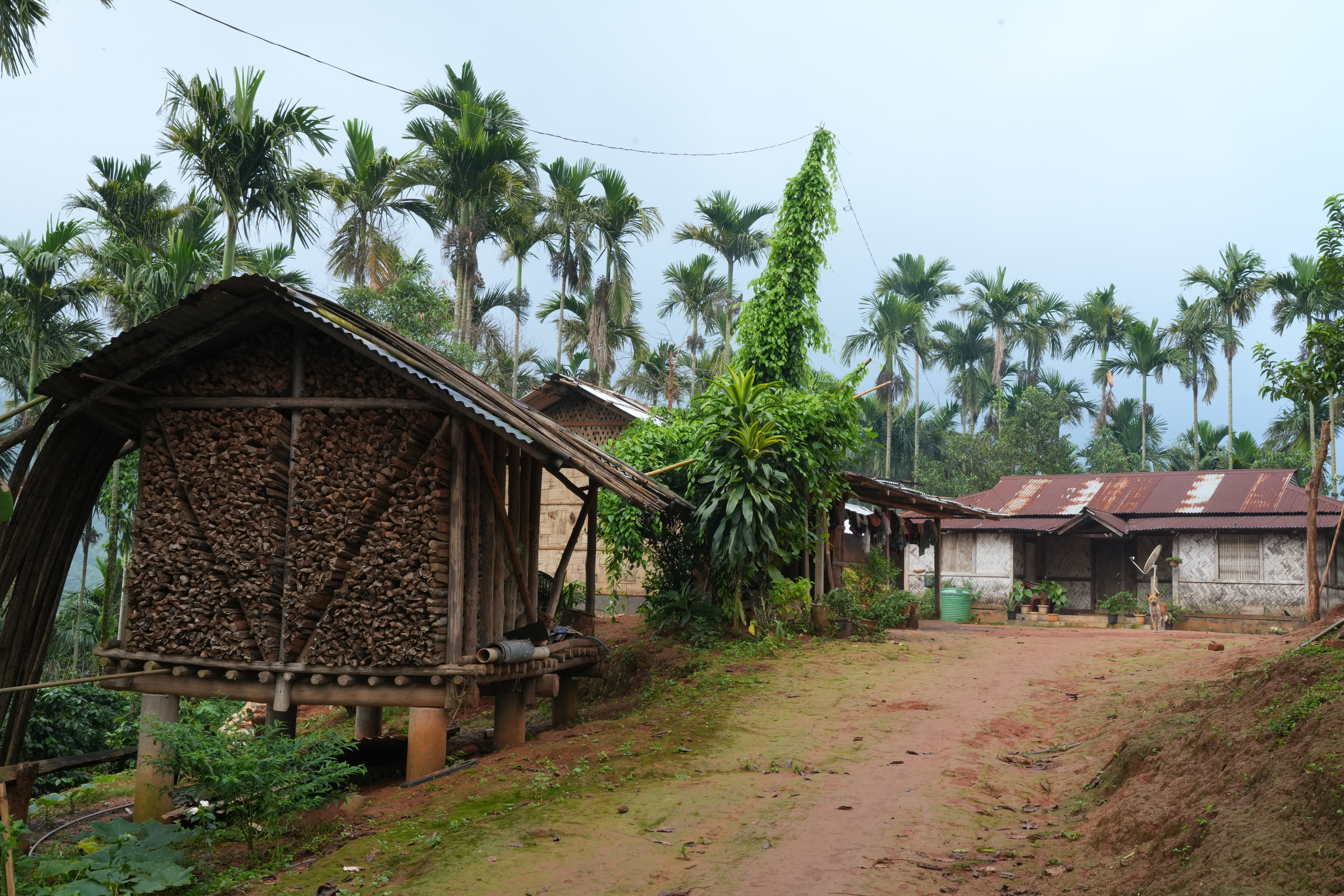
- Bamboo farm buildings and areca trees, Sasatgre

- Location within Meghalaya
- Coordinates: 25.527269°N 90.327383°E
- Country: India
- State: Meghalaya
- Elevation: 900 m (3,000 ft)

Population (2011)
  - Total: 362

Languages
  - Official: English
- Time zone: UTC+5:30 (IST)
- Postal Index Number: 794002
- Website: https://westgarohills.gov.in/

Sasatgre is a village in the West Garo Hills district, Meghalaya, India. Sasatgre is located on a saddle at the edge of the Nokrek Biosphere Reserve. The economy is largely agrarian, following the traditional jhum system of rotational slash-and-burn cropping to a limited extent. Most of the houses are traditional bamboo buildings. Homestays offer tourists an experience of the traditional Garo way of life.

== Description ==
Sasatgre village is located in the Rongram Community & Rural Development (C&RD) block in the West Garo Hills district of Meghalaya. It falls under the North Tura Meghalaya assembly constituency and the North Tura Lok Sabha constituency. The houses are large bamboo structures called Nokmong. Each accommodates one family. Alongside are granaries (Jam nok), woodsheds and pig sties.

== Geography ==
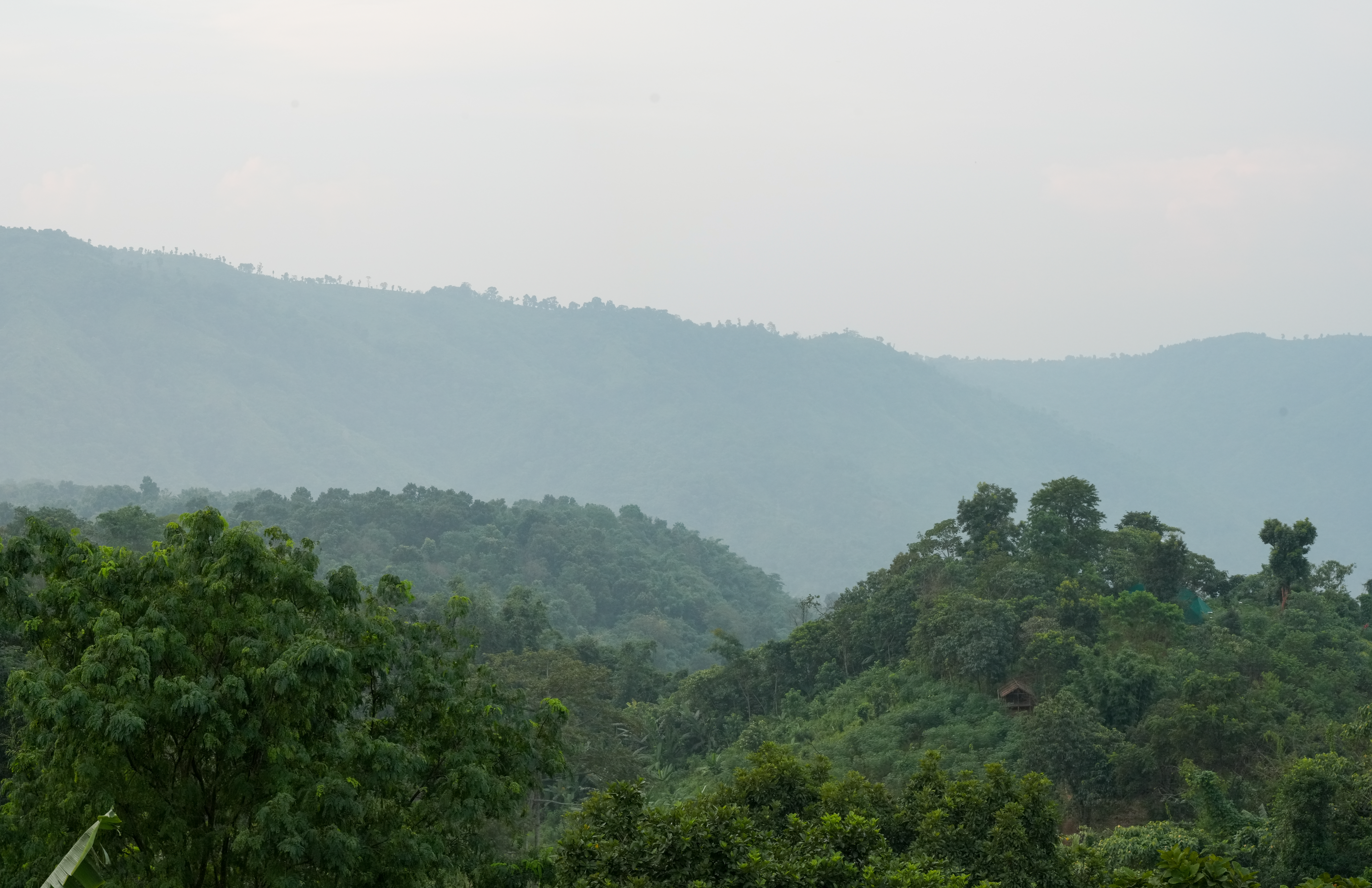
West Garo hills near Sasatgre

Sasatgre is situated in the West Garo Hills at an elevation of 900 m (3,000 ft) in a saddle north of the Nokrek Ridge. The West Garo Hills run from east to west in the western part of Meghalaya, in the bend of the Brahmaputra river as it turns from west to south. The distance from Sasatgre to Asananggre, headquarters of the Rongram C&RD Block, is 22 km (14 mi), and to Tura, district headquarters, is 32 km (20 mi). Shillong, the capital of Meghalaya, is 298 km (185 mi) distant.

=== Climate ===
Sasatgre has a tropical climate, hot and humid during the summer and rainy season (March - October) and pleasantly cool during the short winter (December - February). June - August is the period of heavy rain.

== Demographics ==
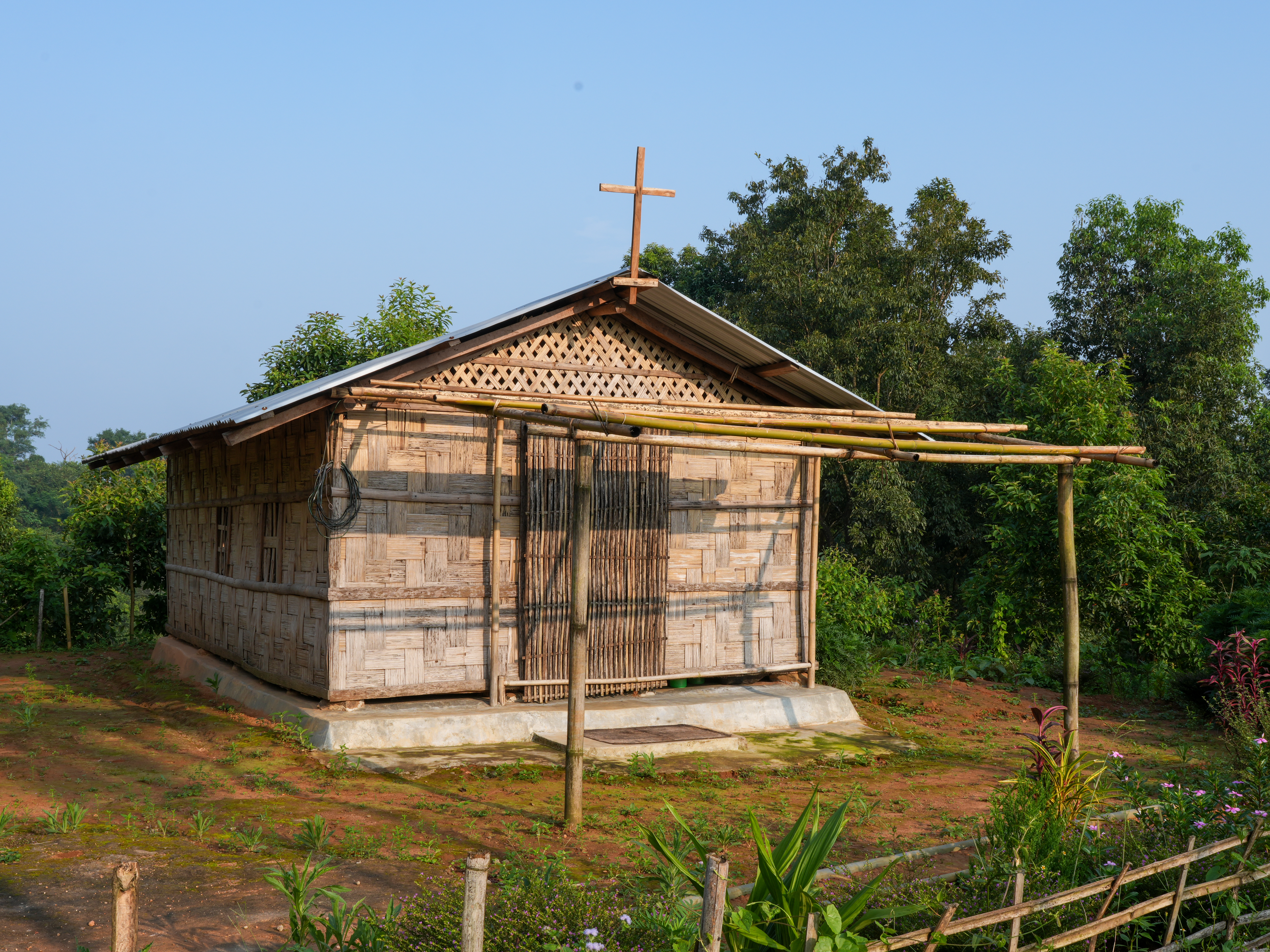
Bamboo church ca. October 2024

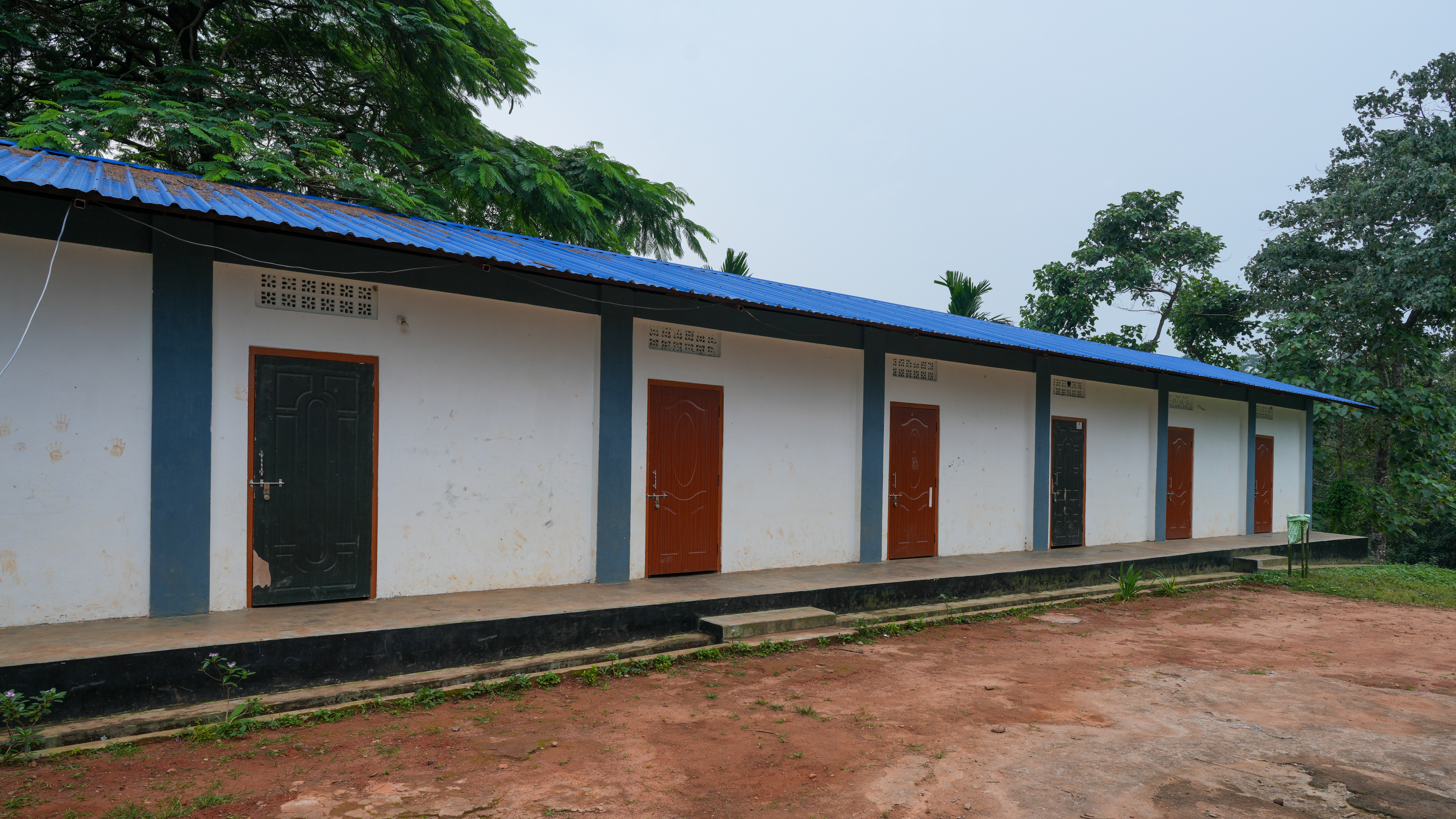
Govt Lower Primary School

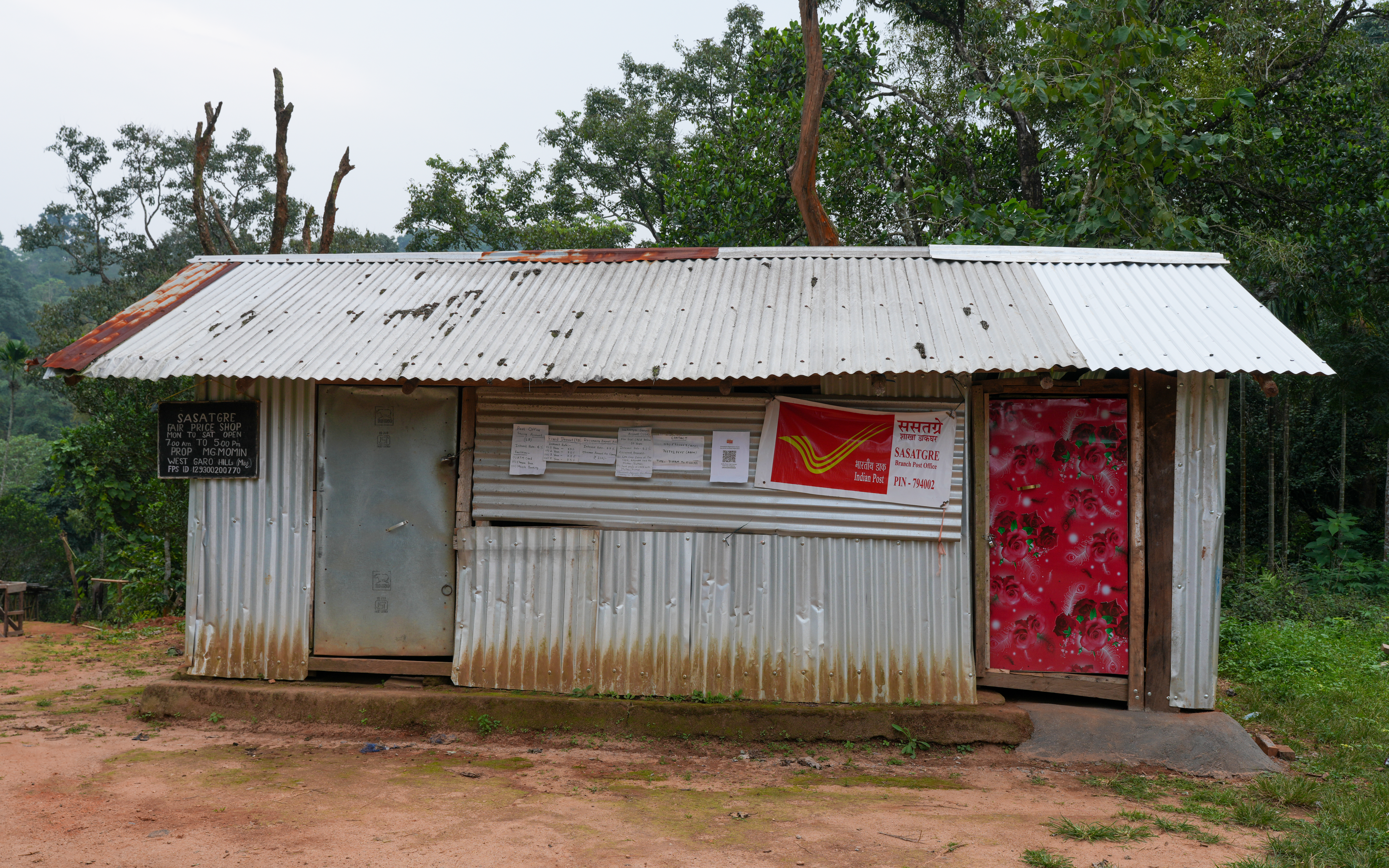
India Post Branch Office

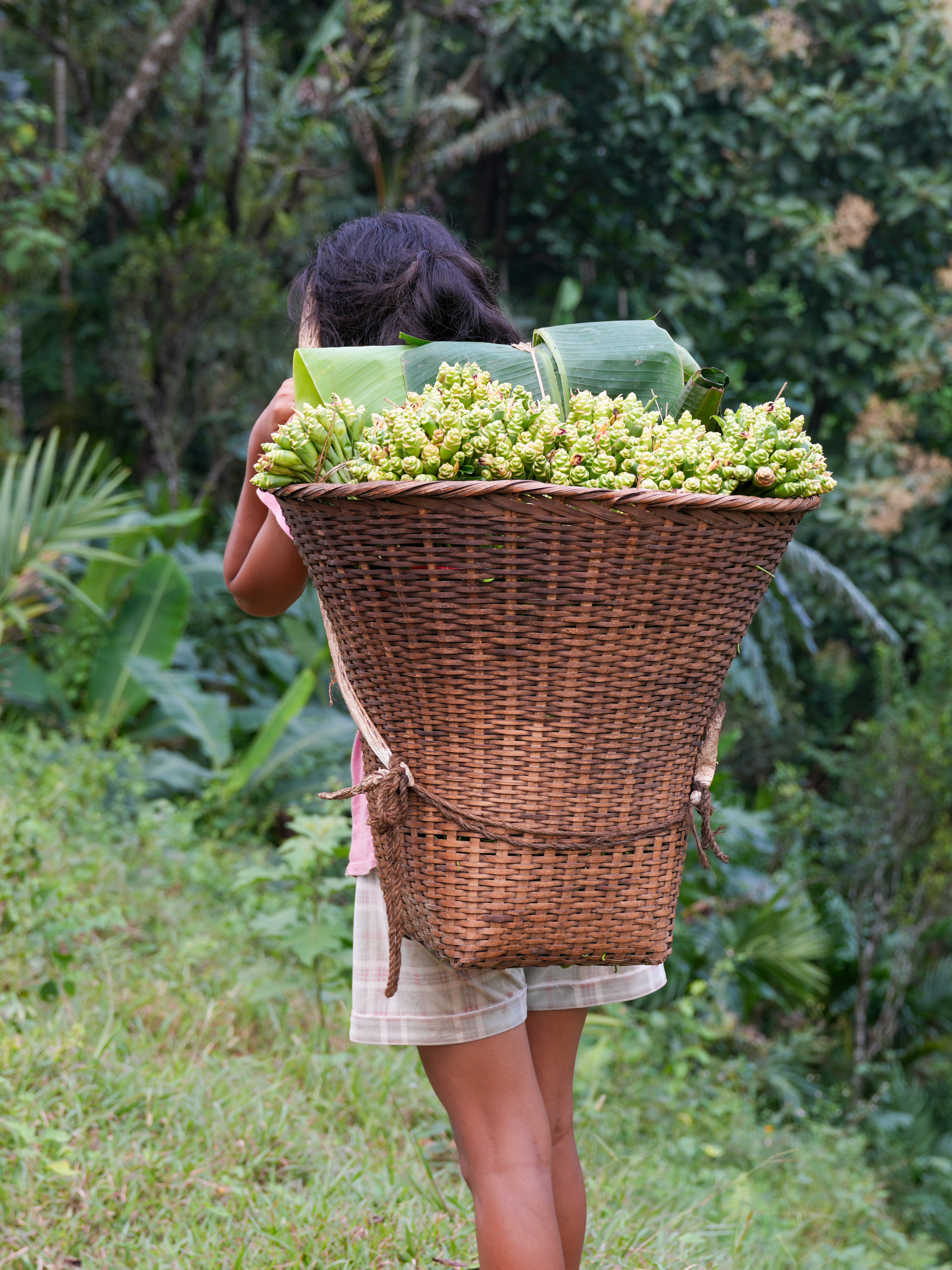
Freshly-harvested ginger flowers in a traditional cane basket

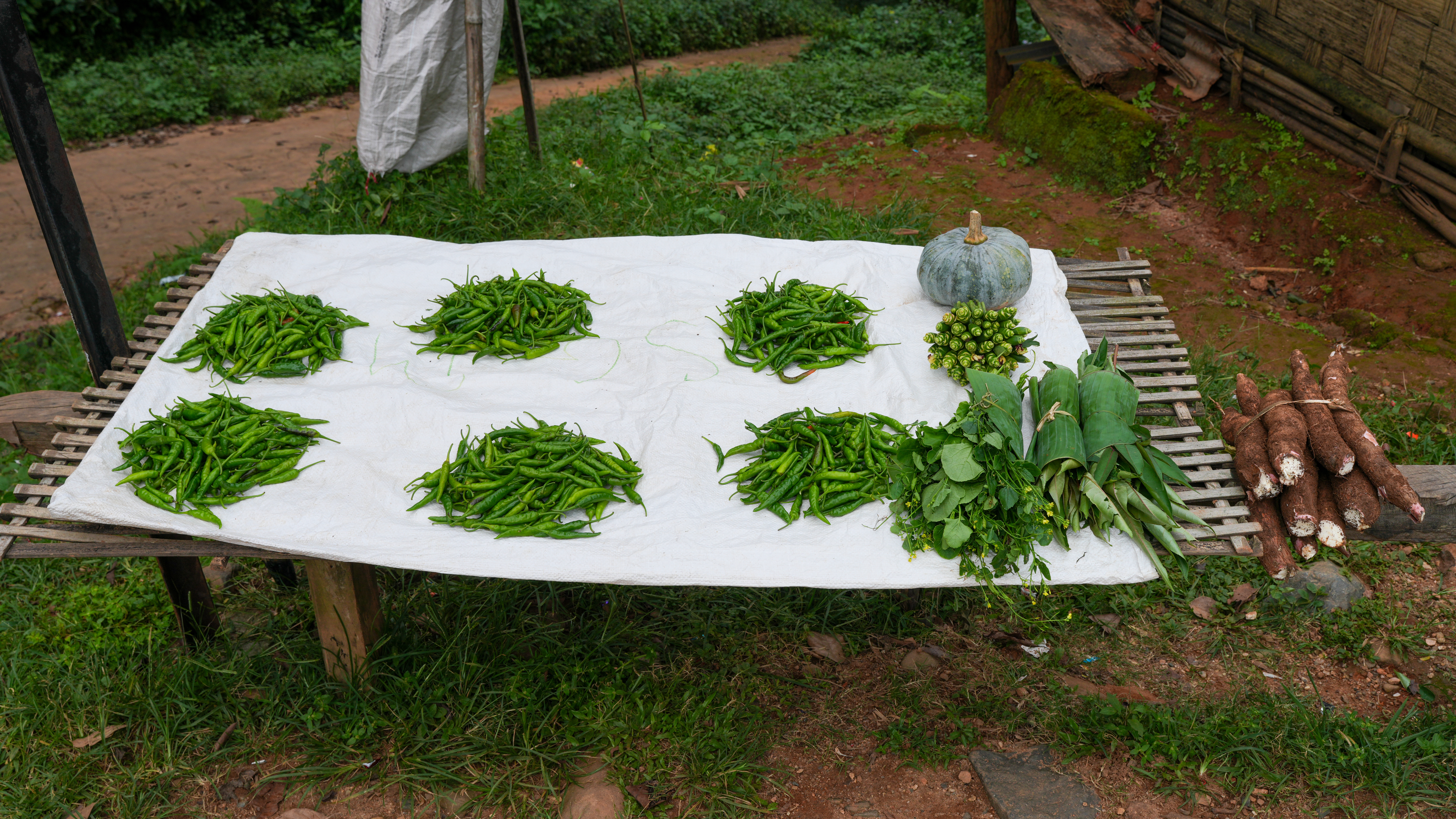
Fresh local produce for sale ca. October 2024

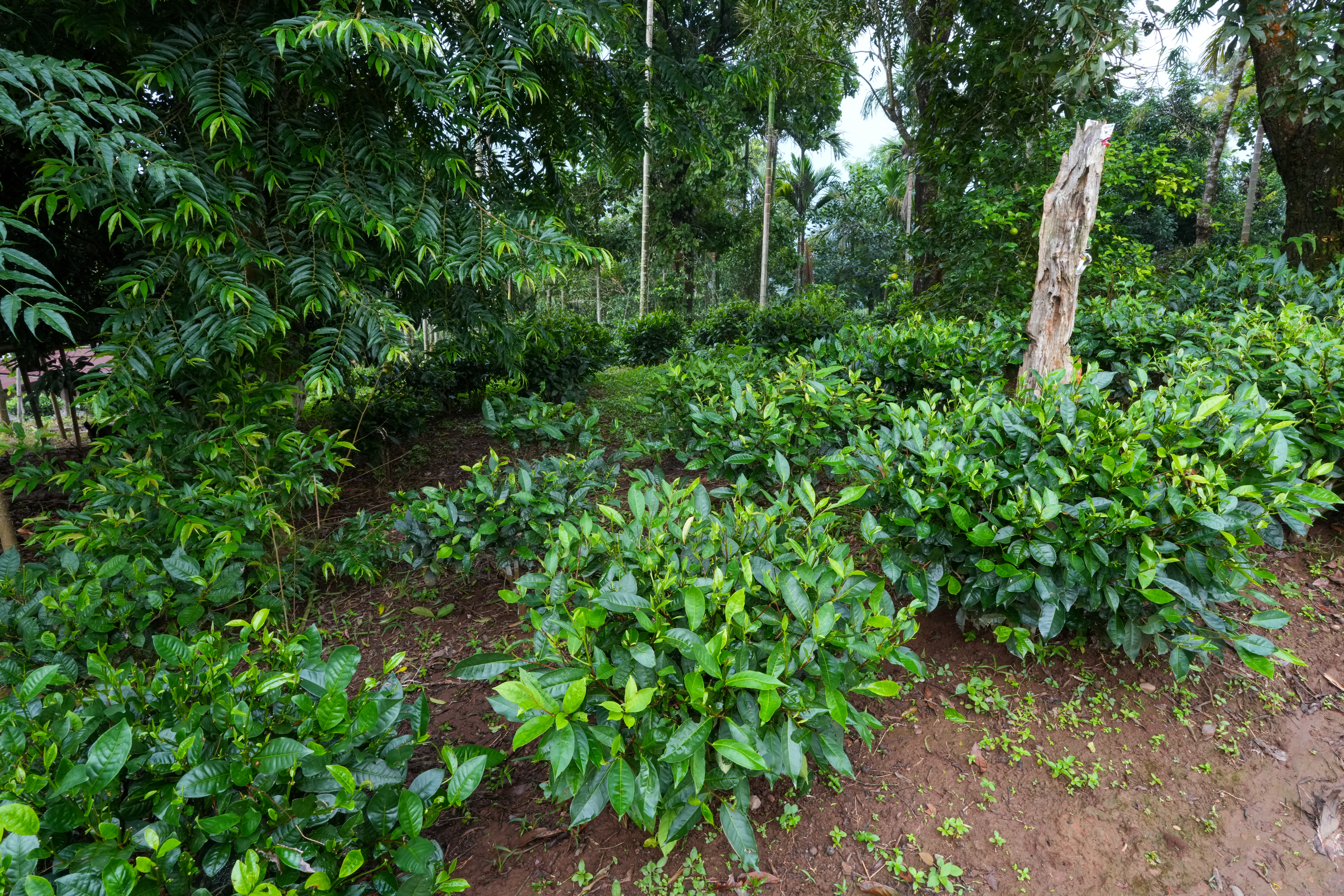
Tea bushes in a household plot ca. October 2024

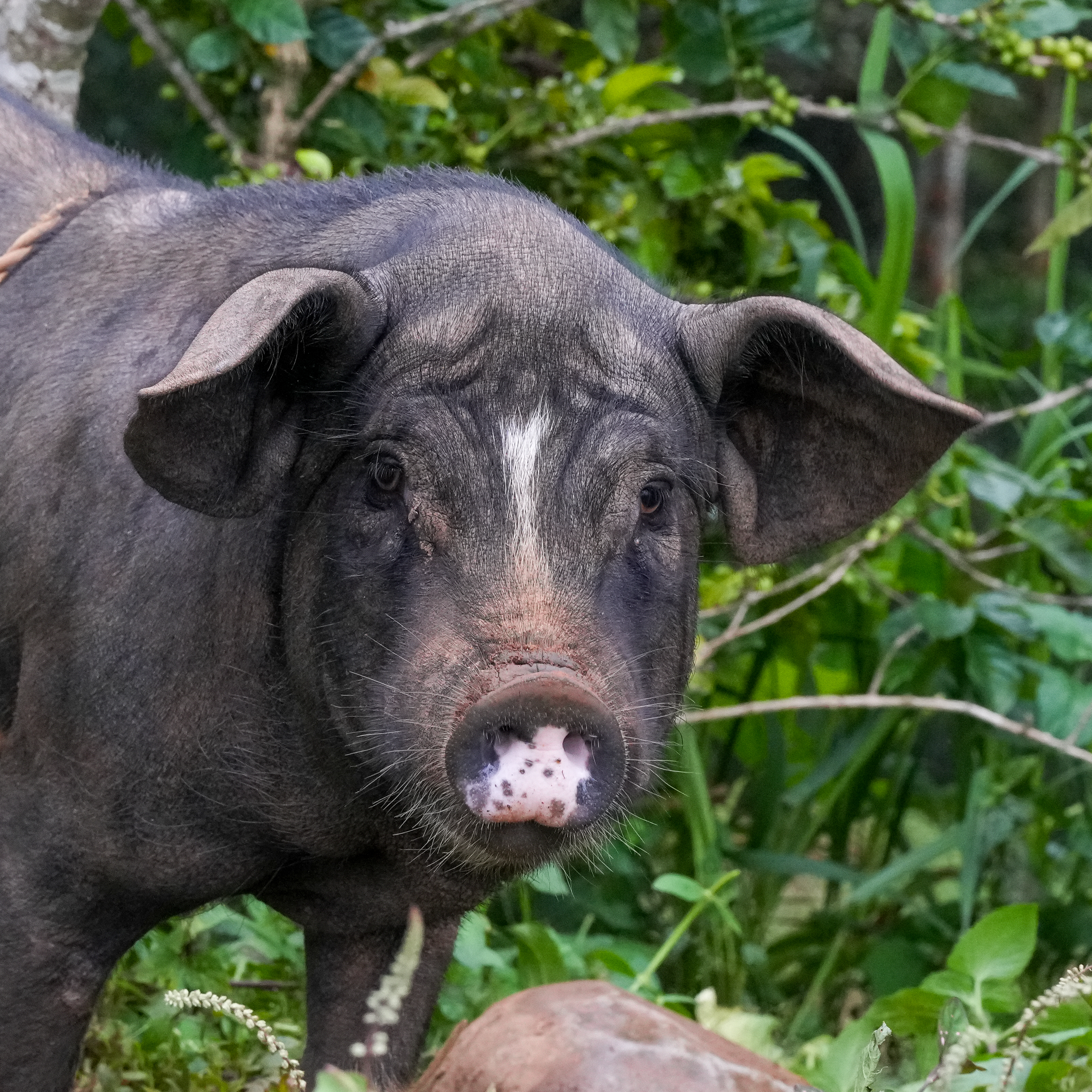
Female domestic pig in a farmyard

In 2011, the total population was 362 in 63 households. Among these 48.9% were female. There were no scheduled castes while 89% belonged to scheduled tribes. The literacy rate was 68.8%. Sasatgre is predominantly Christian though in the rural areas of the West Garo Hills District as a whole, Christians were the majority at 59.0%, Muslims comprised 18.6% and Hindus were 18.3% as per the Census 2011.

== Governance ==
Traditionally, the village was governed by one or more male nokmas (headmen). These are selected from the leading households of the village based on lineage. The nokma in consultation with the households allots the plots for jhumming every year. He also is responsible for settling disputes. As the Garo society is matrilinal, the nokma typically looks for a young man from his own lineage to marry his daughter. The son-in-law then inherits the household and becomes nokma when the father-in-law dies.

The system has evolved after Indian Independence. The Garo Hills Autonomous District Council passed the Garo Hills District (Jhum) Regulation Act, 1954 that confers on the nokma the right to allot jhum land. However, disputes related to allotment are now referred to the Village Council instead of being resolved by the nokma. Village Councils were created based on the Constitution of Village Council Act in 1958. The Village Council is intended to make each village a self-sufficient, efficiently administered unit. It is responsible for maintenance of public paths, roads, wells, tanks, etc., for registration of births and deaths and other record keeping, etc.

=== Sasatgre Community Reserve ===
Since 2013, the Forest Department, Government of Meghalaya has declared 64 Community Reserves under the Wild Life (Protection) Act, 1972. The Sasatgre Community Reserve with an area of 60 ha (150 acres) was notified on 10 July 2013. The notification gives complete control of the Community Reserve to the community to protect the flora and fauna, and the traditional conservation values and practices. All traditional rites and rituals are permitted, though hunting is not allowed. The Reserve is managed by the Sasatgre Community Reserve Management Committee.

== Amenities ==
Sasatgre village has a pre-primary and primary school, established in 1962. As of 2011, a middle school is within 5 km (3.1 mi). For secondary and higher education, students have to commute more than 10 km (6.2 mi). The village has several water sources including piped and well water, springs and ponds. Mobile telephony and electricity supply are available. The village has a sports field. There is an India Post Branch Office (B.O.) with pincode 794002.

== Economy ==
The economy is largely agrarian. In 2011, people cultivating their own or leased land comprised 87% of the main workers (those employed for >6 months in a year). Sasatgre lies on the edge of the Nokrek Gene Sanctuary-cum-Biosphere Reserve. Orange plantations are a feature of the village. Weaving of cane and bamboo products is done by households mostly for their own use, increasingly for sale to tourists. They make bamboo mats, kok (traditional baskets), and a variety of containers.

=== Agriculture ===
Traditionally, Garo villages followed the jhum system of rotational cropping. In the jhum system, A'king land is owned by the community. Each year, the Nokma allots plots of A'king land to each household for pre-determined crops. After 2 years of use, a plot is left fallow for 6–8 years during which scrub forest grows. When the plot is again allotted for cropping, the scrub forest is cleared and burnt in a planned operation. This traditional cycle of 'slash-and-burn' rotational cultivation is believed to be sustainable ecologically and culturally.

In the first year, the plot is used for vegetables such as sweet potato, ginger, varieties of beans, sugarcane, onions, etc. In the second year, grains such as rice, maize or millet are grown on the plot. Bananas, oranges and pineapples are also grown. Gourds and squashes are grown on frames or on the walls of houses. In some plots, cash crops such as areca, cotton and chilli peppers are planted. The planting of vegetables is somewhat random, adding variety to the diet and improving the soil health. In a few low lying plots, rice is cultivated continuously.

Since about 1970, some families took advantage of a custom that permitted planting of crops on any land not already covered by the jhum system. They constructed permanent fields in low-lying areas to grow wet rice. Some also planted pineapples, tea and areca palms. These families moved their houses away from the central village to the location of their permanent fields. The cultivators can get the district administration to survey such permanent fields. In due course, the ownership (patta) is granted to the cultivators. With the patta comes the obligation to pay taxes, which is not the case with jhum land.

By 2022, due to the State Government policy of granting ownership to cultivators, only about 10% of the land was under the jhum system. This change has caused greater inequality in the village, and it may adversely affect the nutritional value of the villagers' diet and the health of the soil.

=== Animal husbandry ===
Raising of livestock is common though secondary to agriculture. The main animals are cattle, goats, pigs and fowl.

== Transport ==
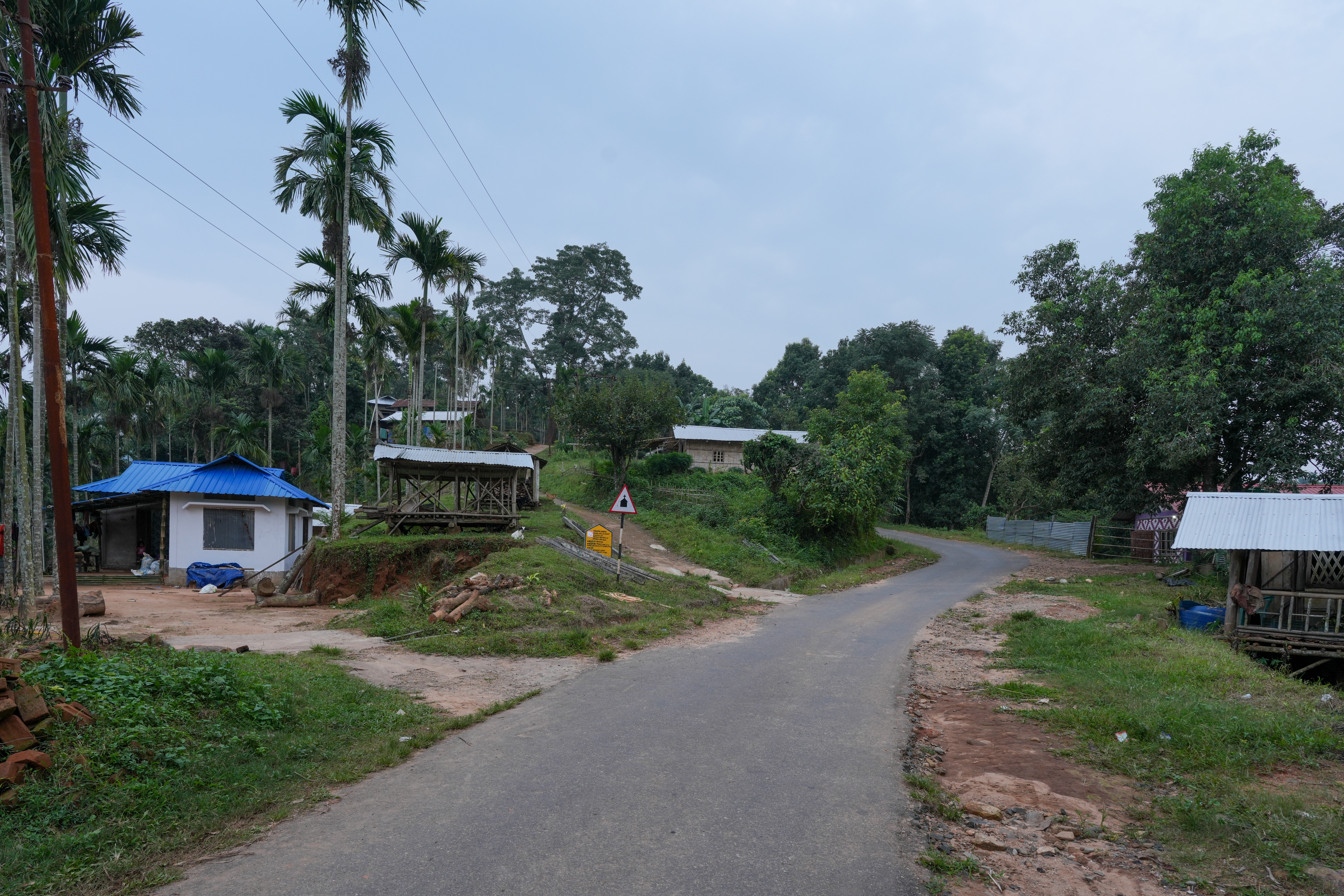
Main road through Sasatgre towards Daribokgre

Sasatgre is connected to important places in the district by black-topped roads. The Meghalaya Transport Corporation buses run at infrequent intervals. Many private buses serve the district regularly. Taxis and vans are available for hire. The nearest railway station and airport are in Guwahati, Assam, at distances of 211 km (131 mi) and 195 km (121 mi) respectively.

== Tourism ==
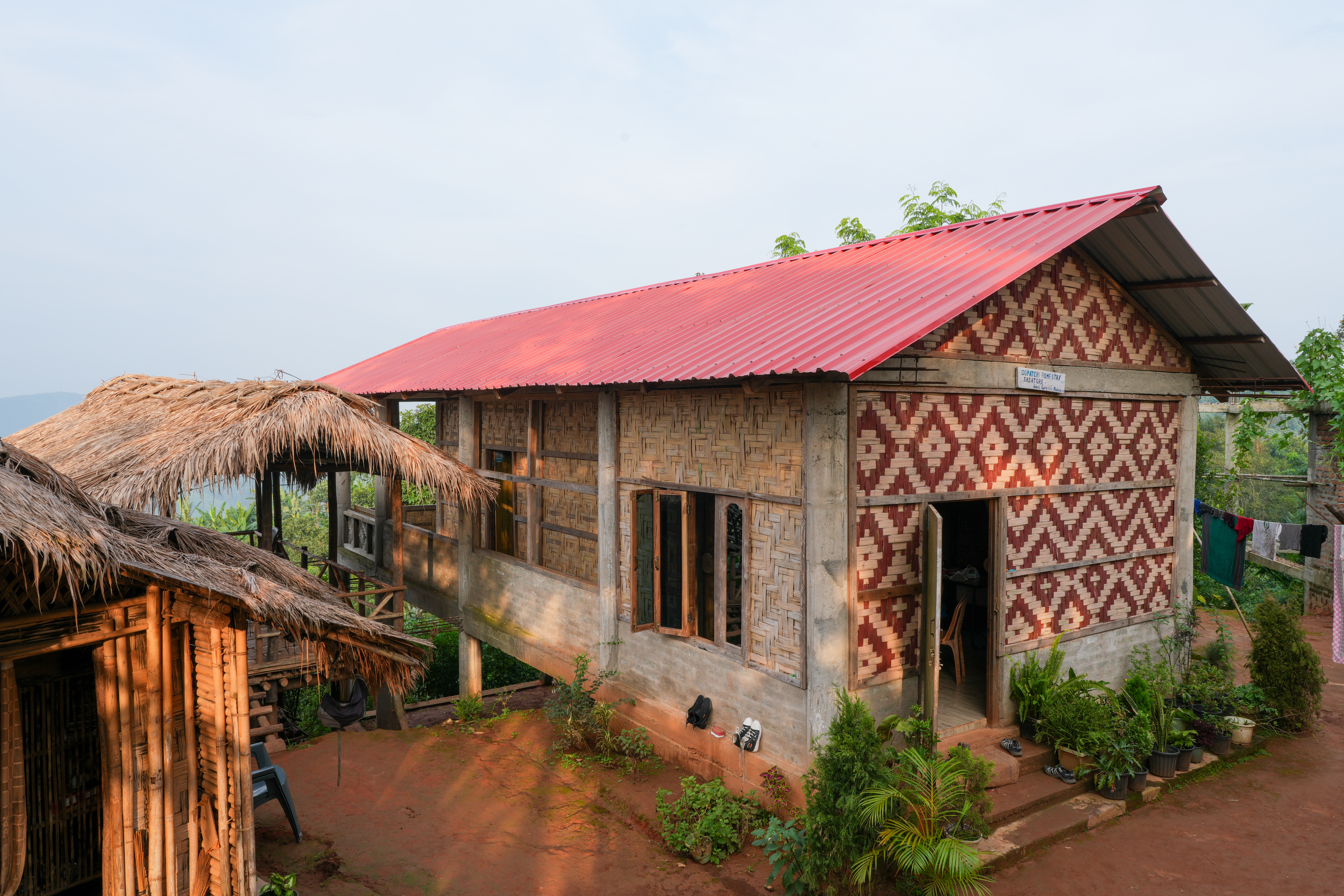
Traditional buildings, Dopatchi Homestay

Sasatgre is on the edge of the Nokrek Biosphere Reserve which contains the Nokrek National Park in its core. Sasatgre is a convenient base for visiting the Daribokgre entrance to Nokrek about 7 km (4.3 mi) distant. As the villagers retain many of their traditional customs, tourists can experience the tribal lifestyle in a few homestays. A local resident, Dharmen Momin pioneered homestays in Sasatgre with Dopatchi Homestay using traditional bamboo buildings. The thatched roofs provide nesting places for birds. Visitors experience Garo food, bird-watching, bee-keeping, etc. For his efforts, Momin received the Silver Indian Responsible Tourism Award 2023 in the category "Sustainability Champions: Grassroots Heroes".

== Gallery ==
=== Buildings ===
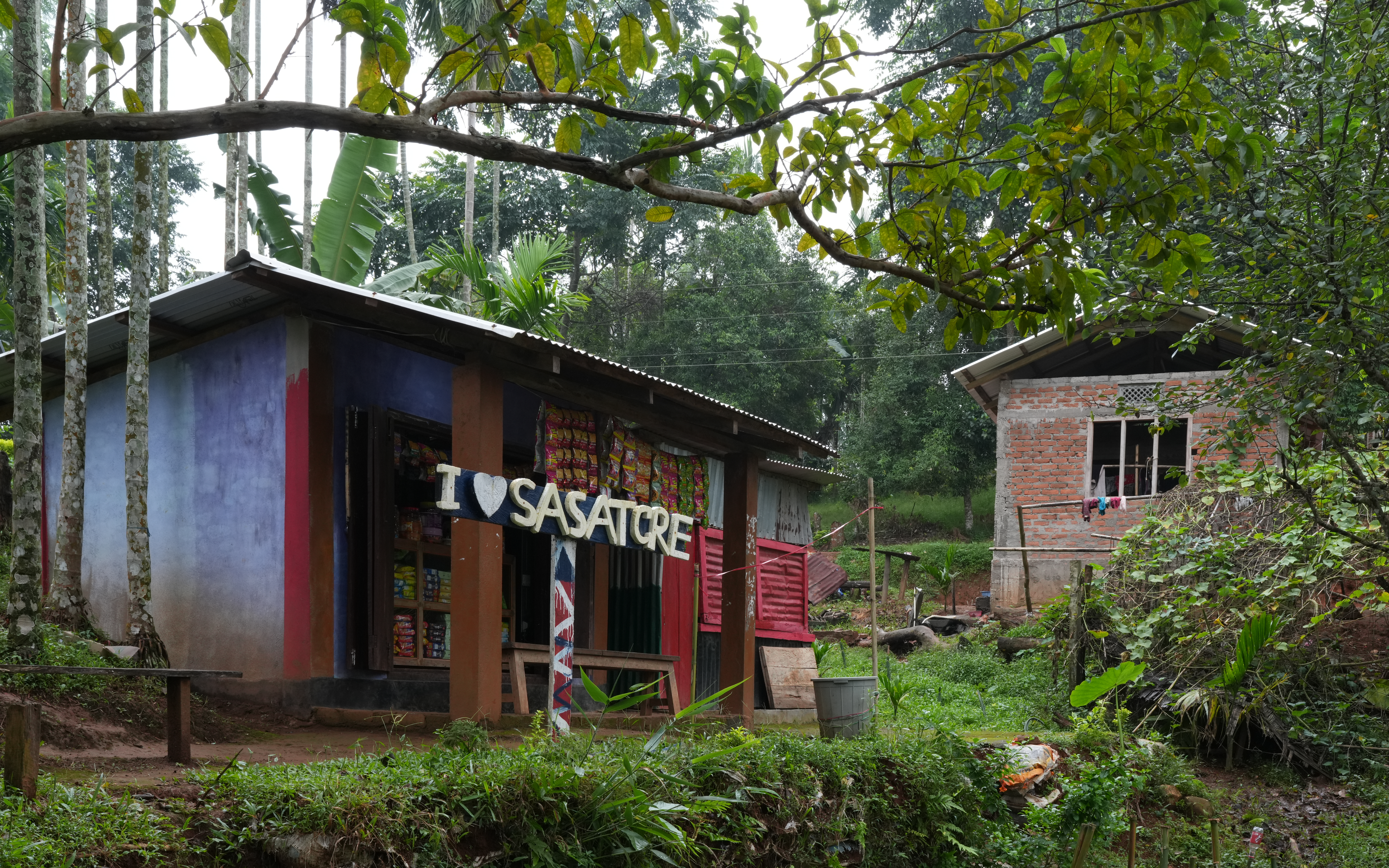
Shop selling packaged snacks, etc.

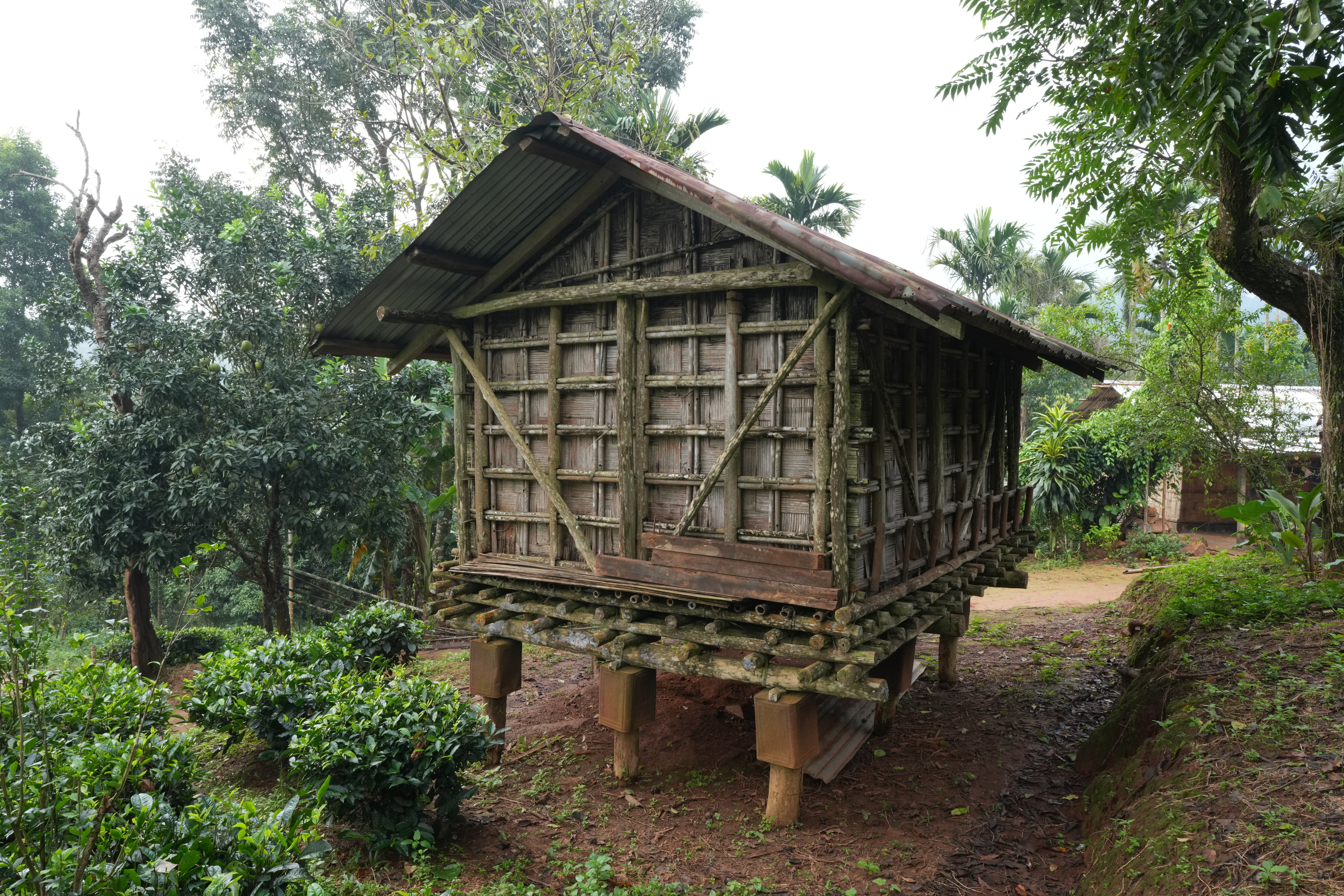
Bamboo building on stilts

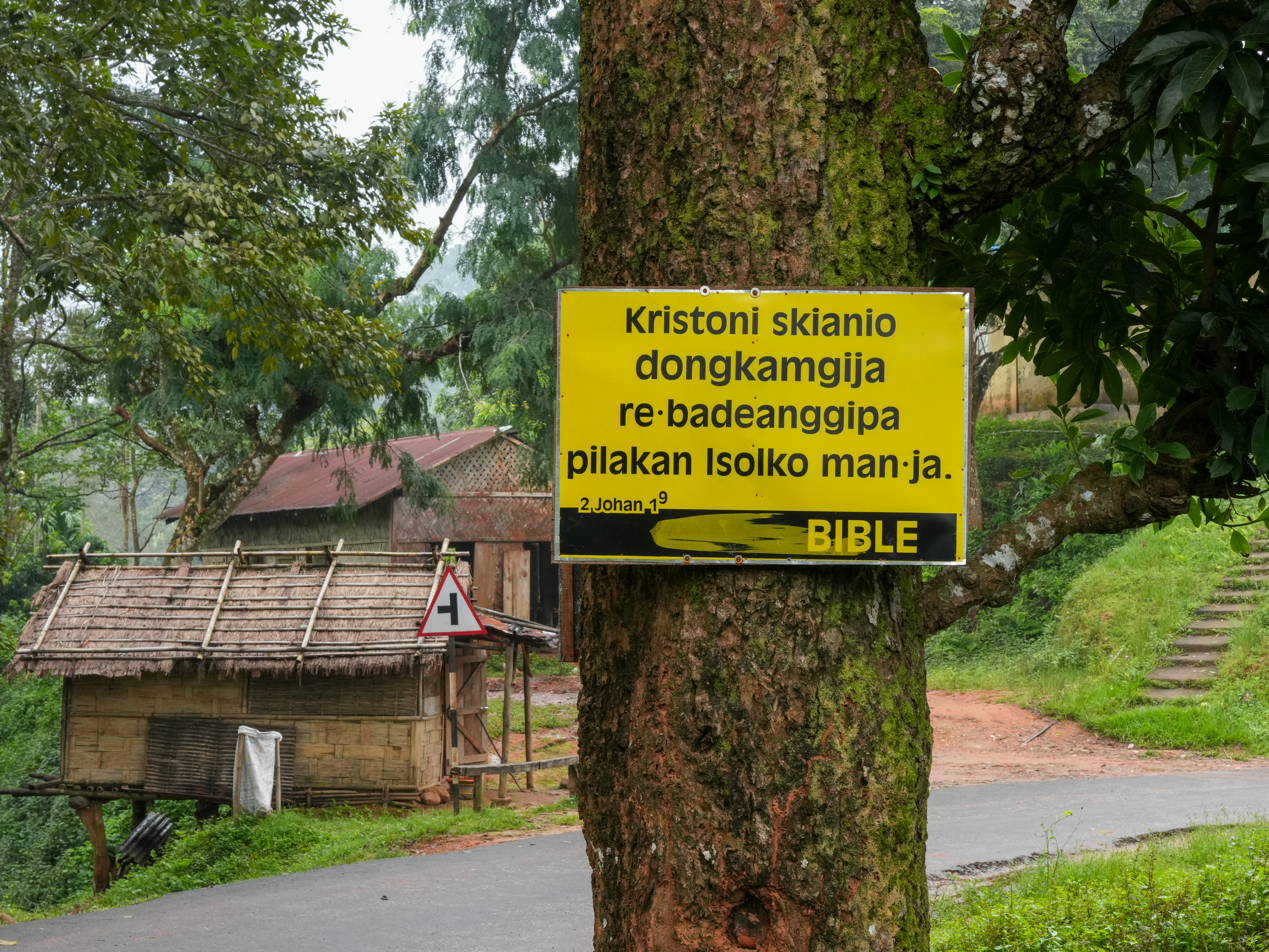
Bible verse in Garo

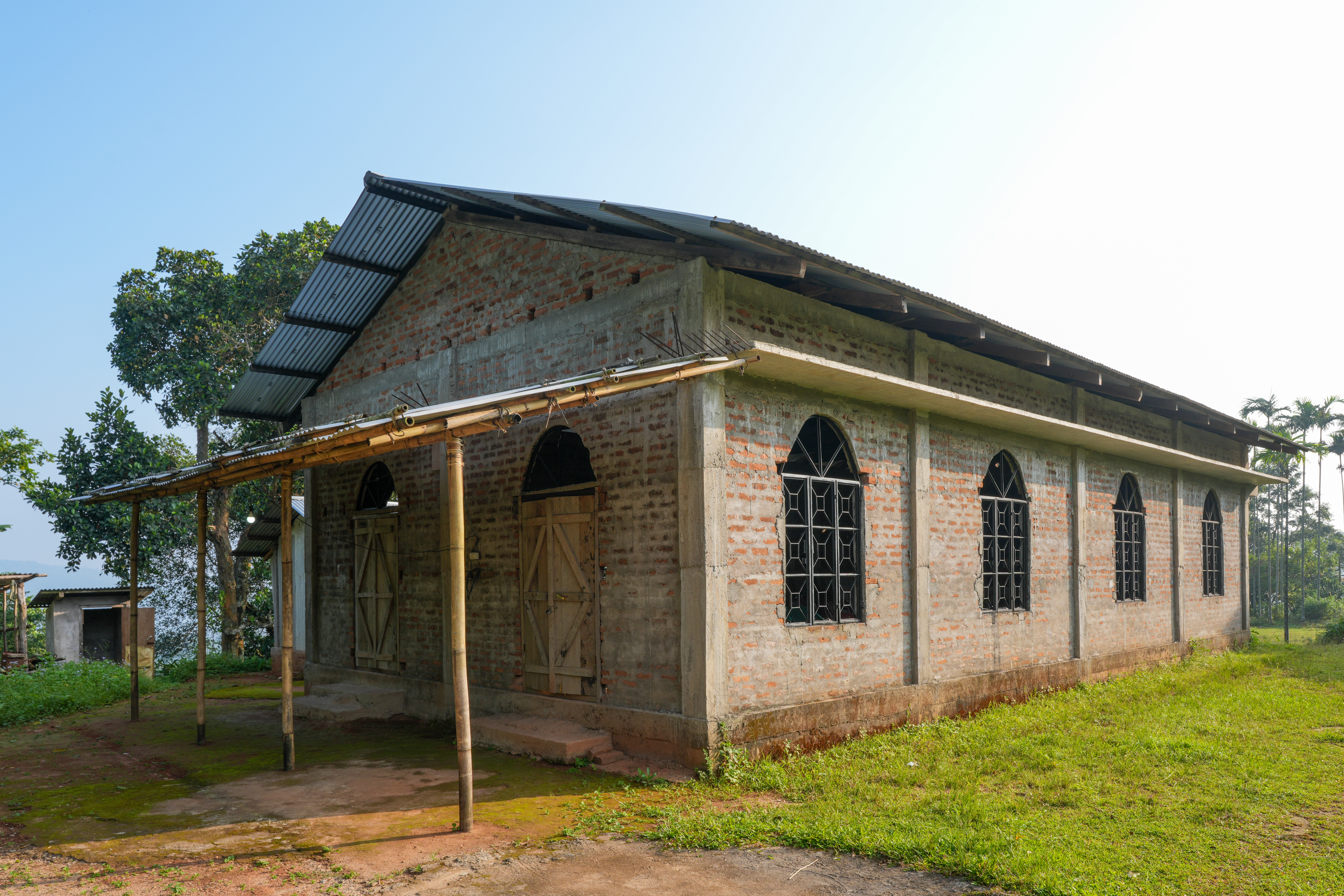
Baptist Church

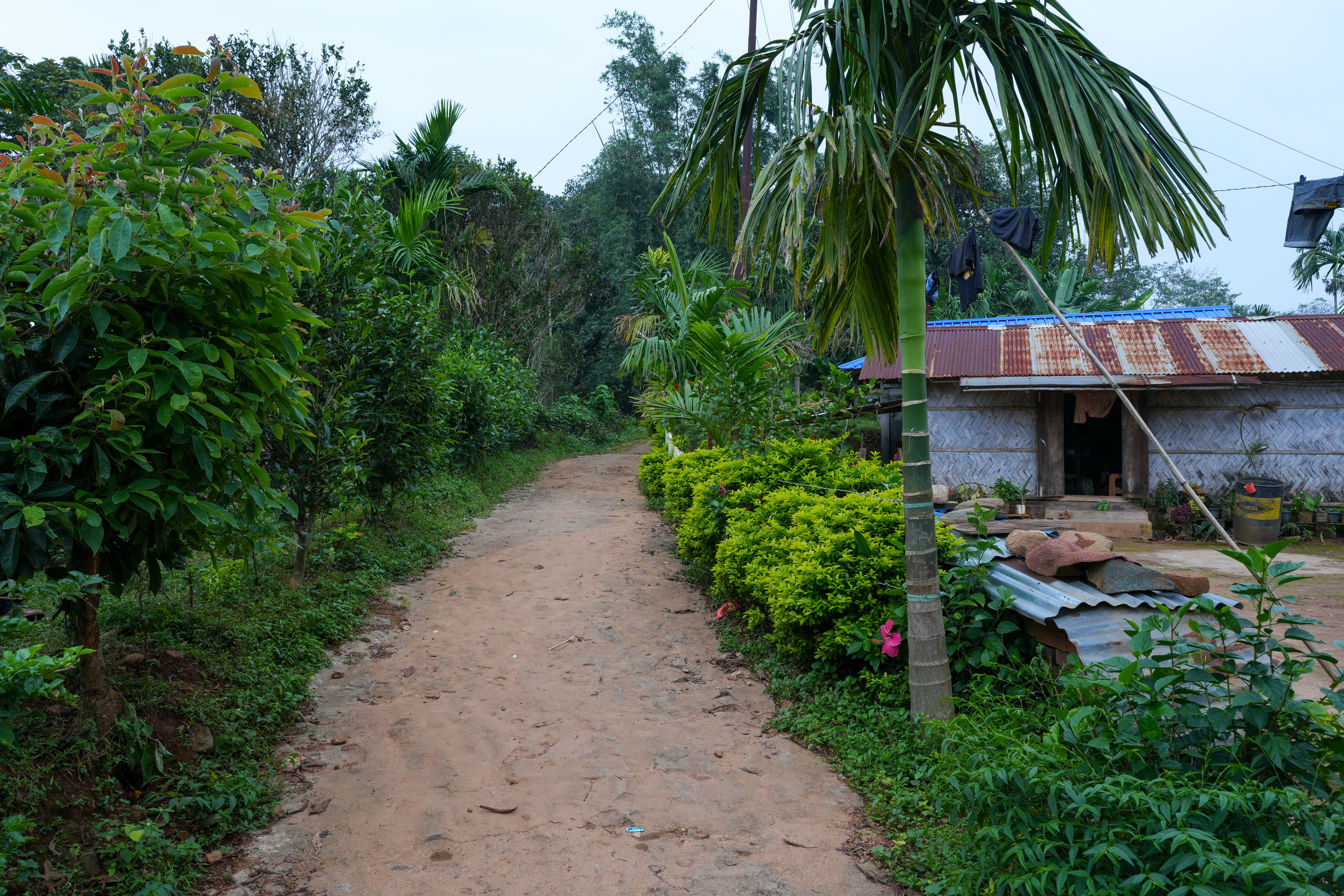
Footpath through Sasatgre

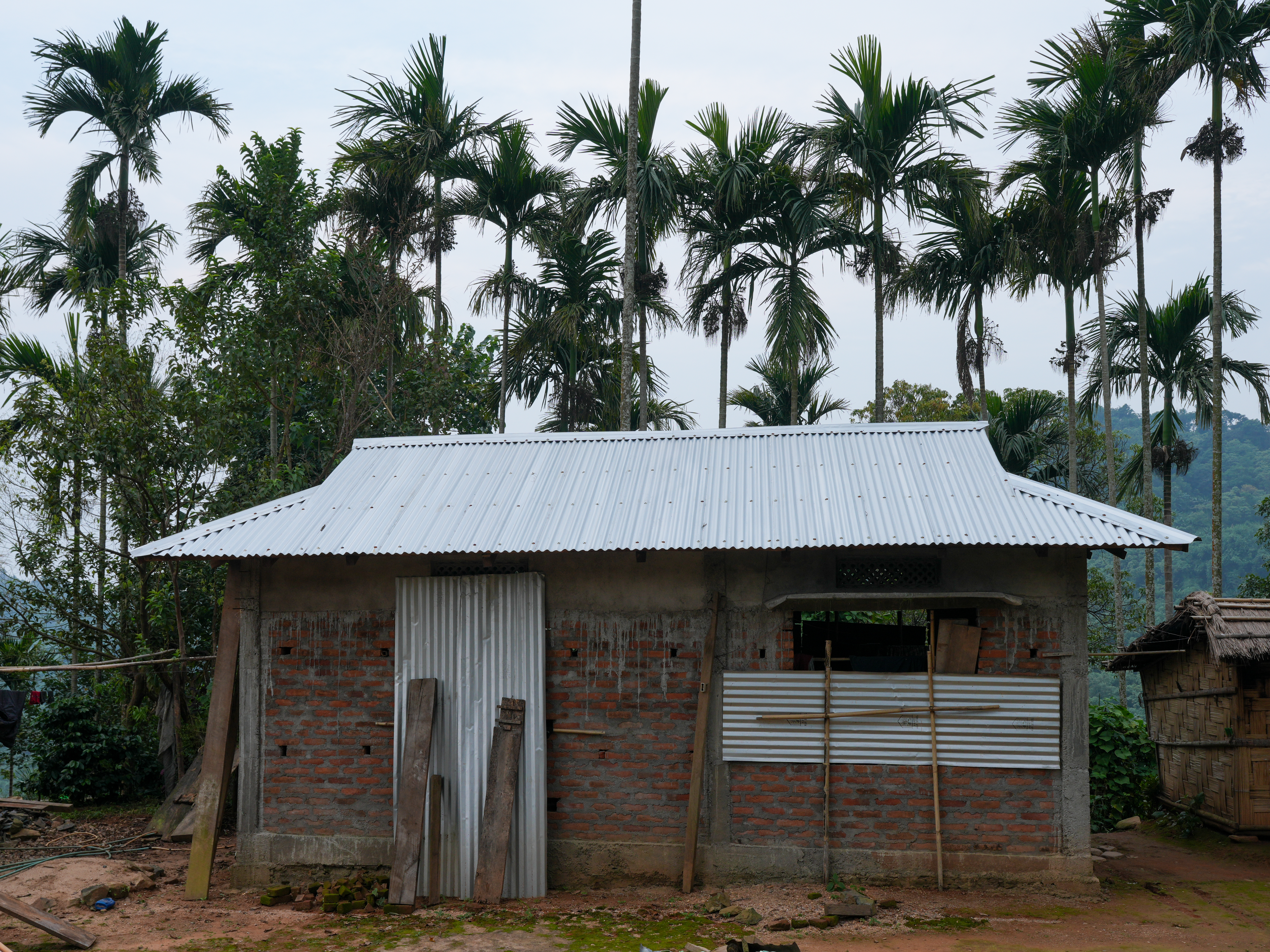
Concrete+brick house under construction

=== Animals ===
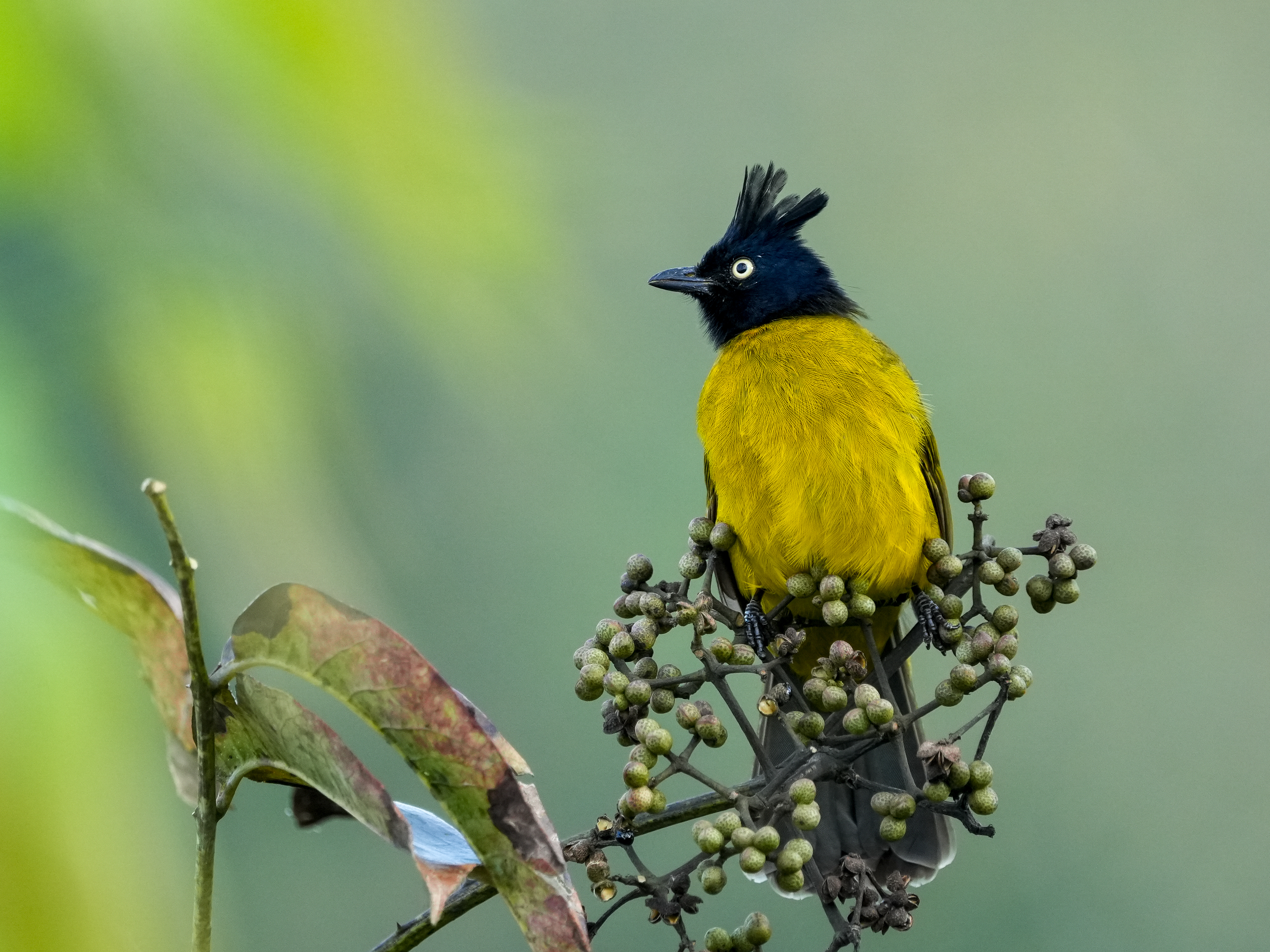
Black-crested bulbul (Rubigula flaviventris)

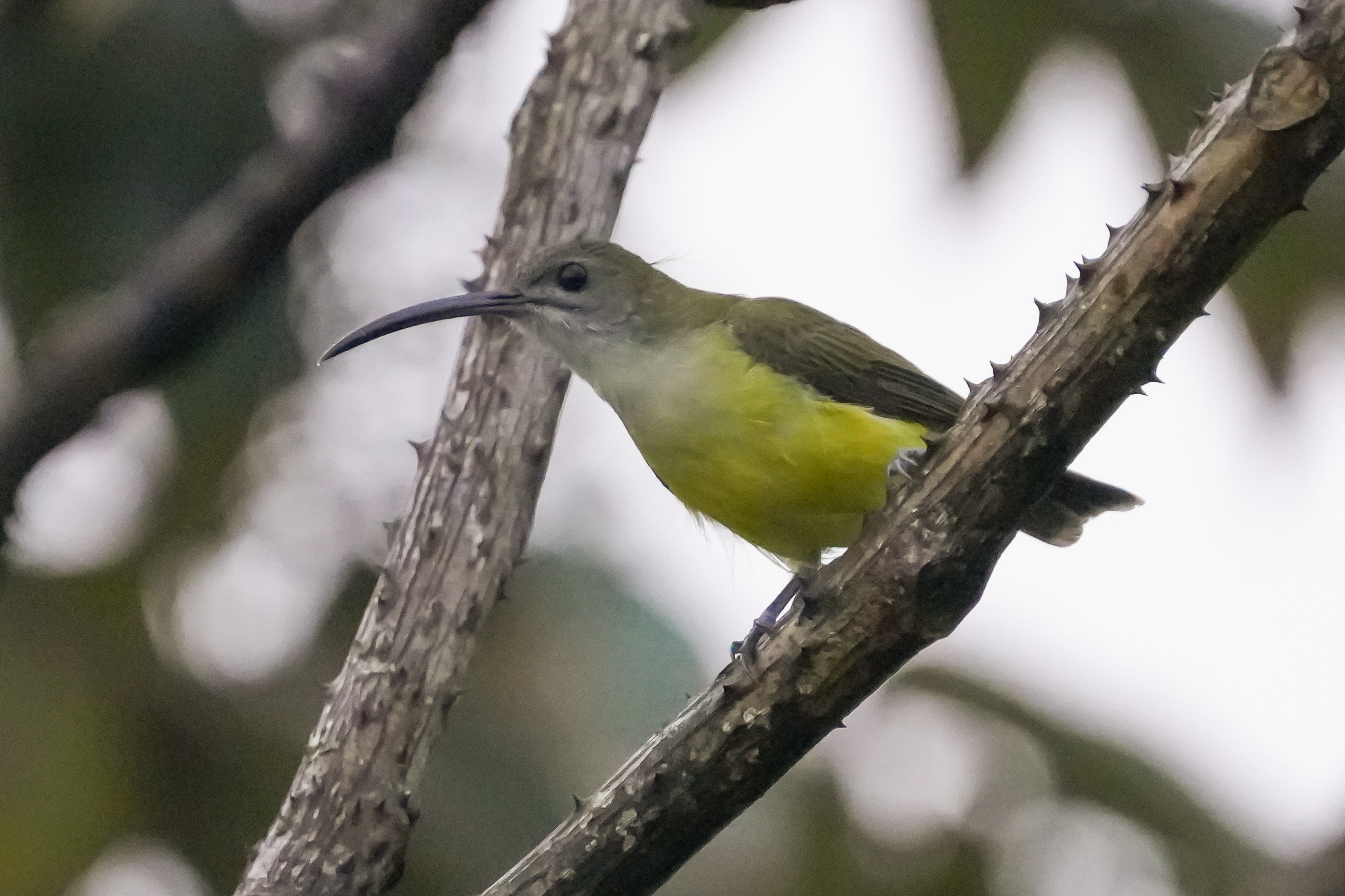
Little spiderhunter (Arachnothera longirostra)

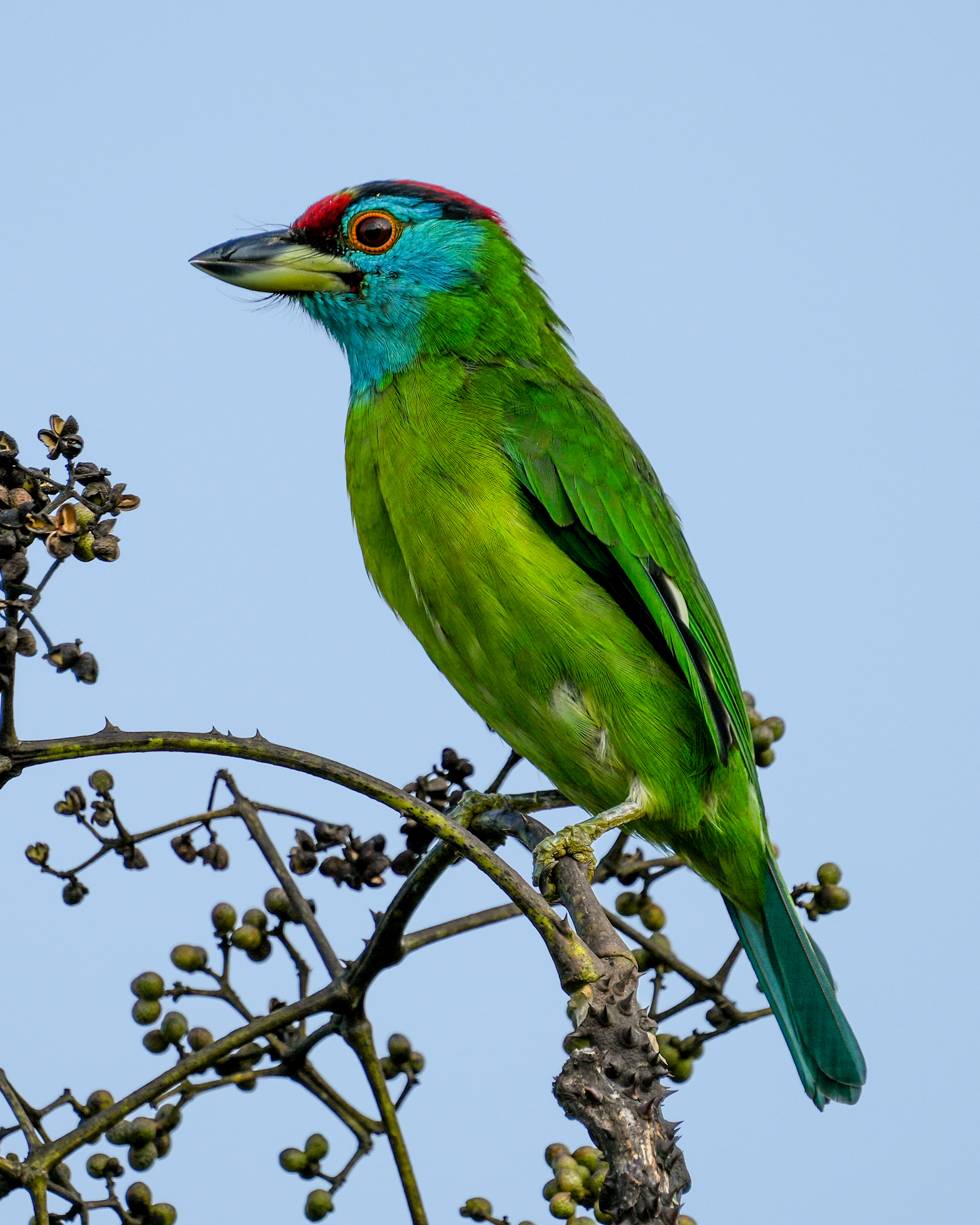
Blue-throated barbet (Psilopogon asiaticus)

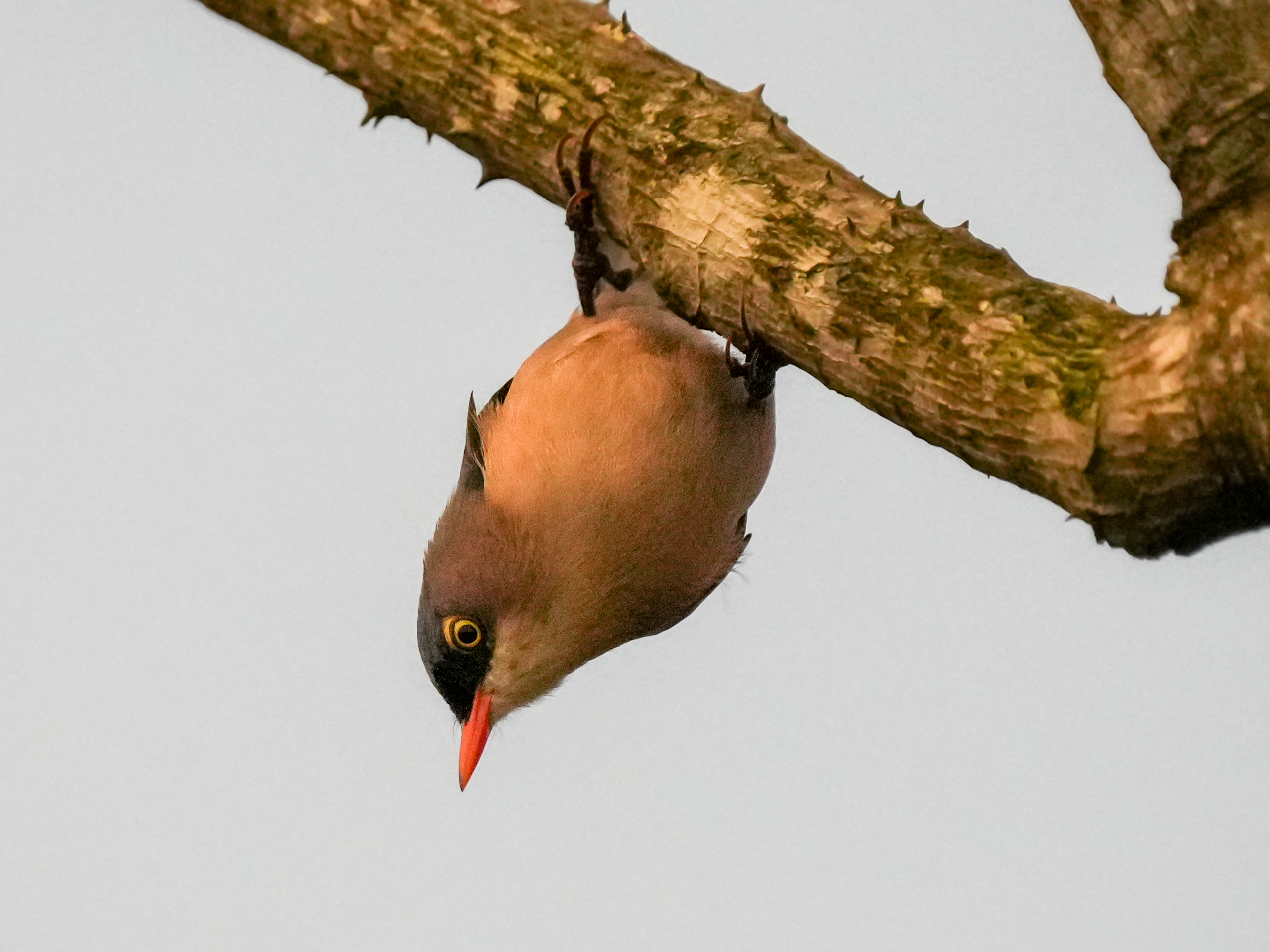
Velvet-fronted nuthatch (Sitta frontalis)

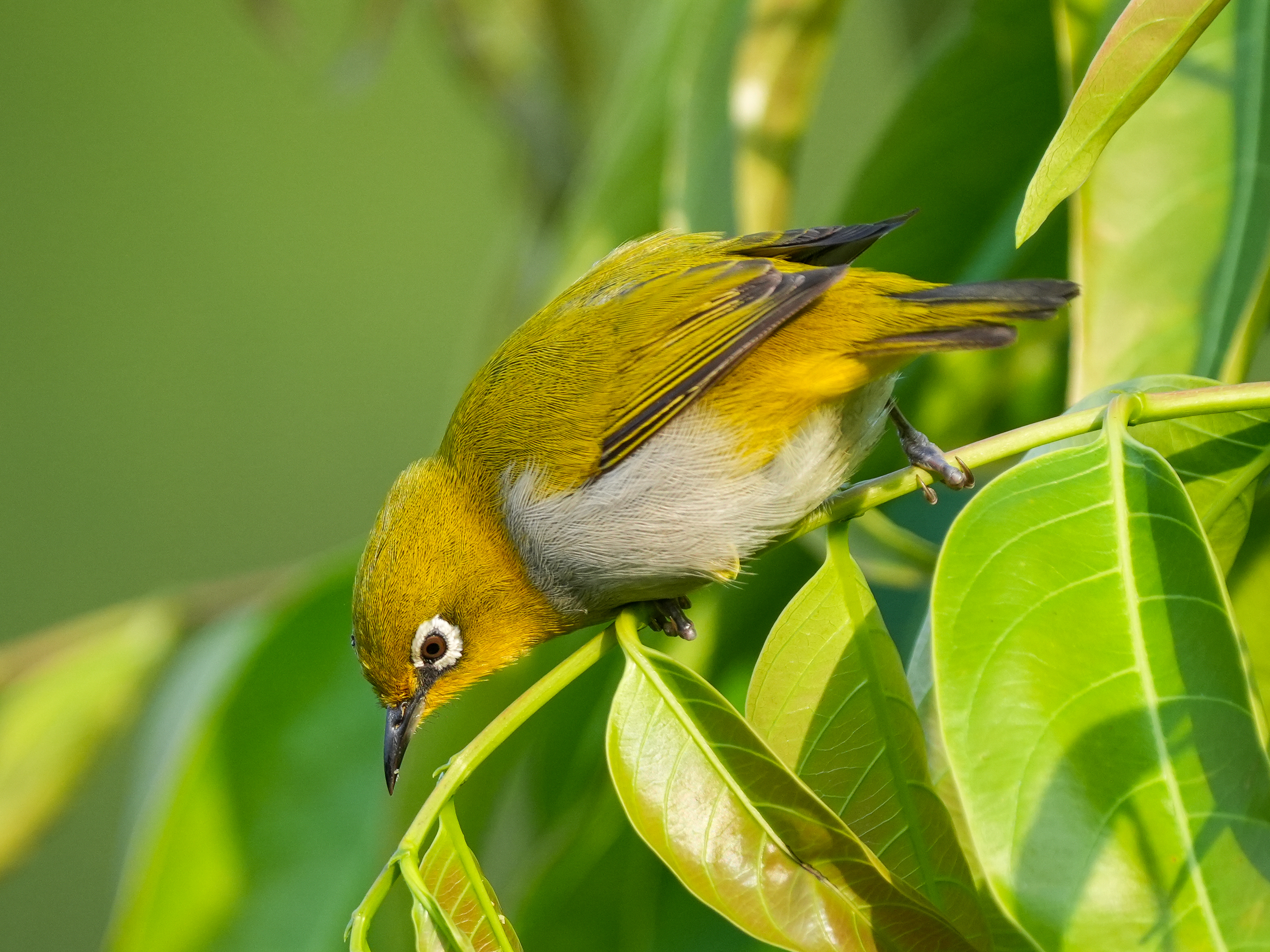
Indian white-eye (Zosterops palpebrosus)

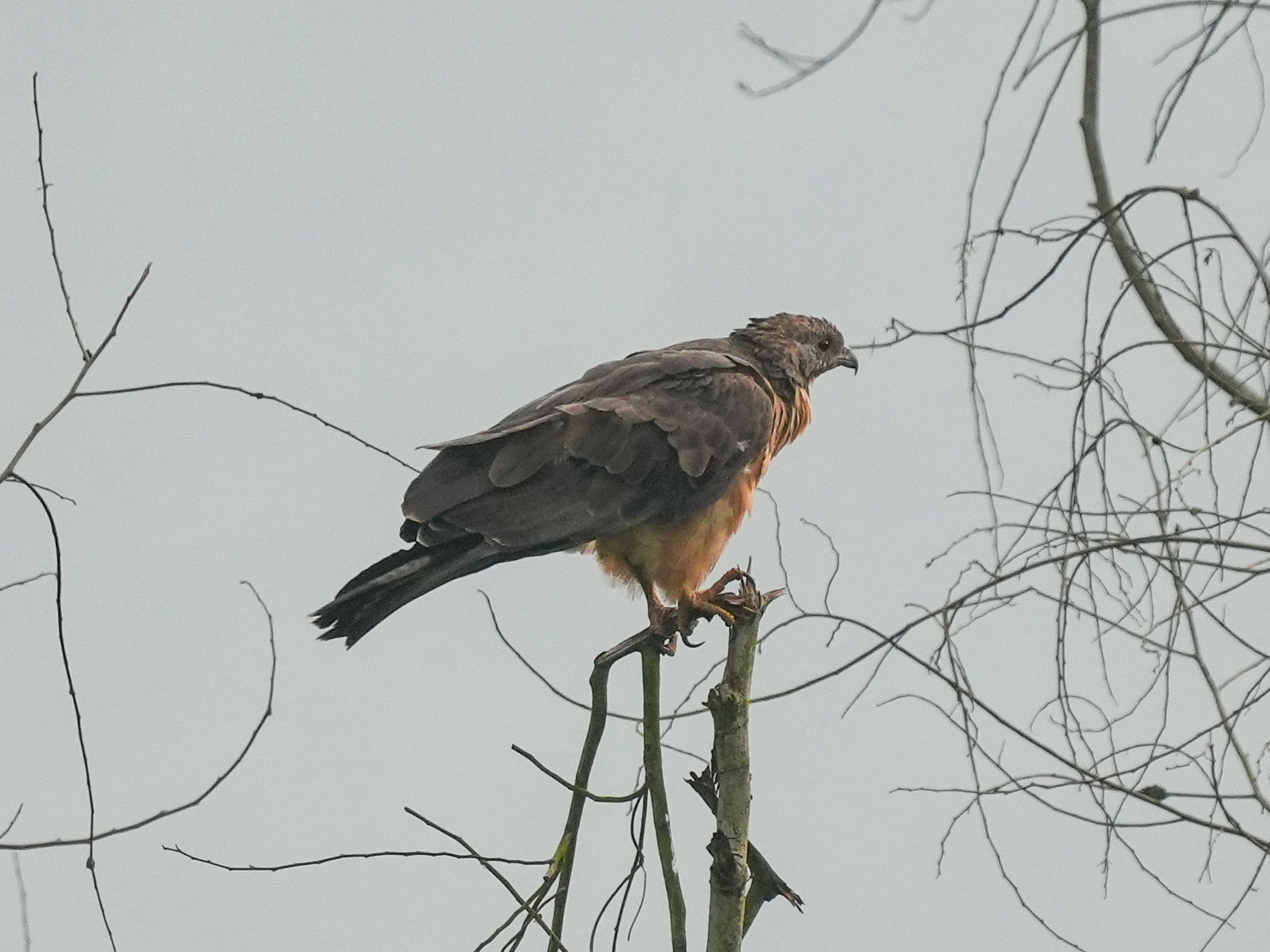
Himalayan buzzard (Buteo burmanicus)

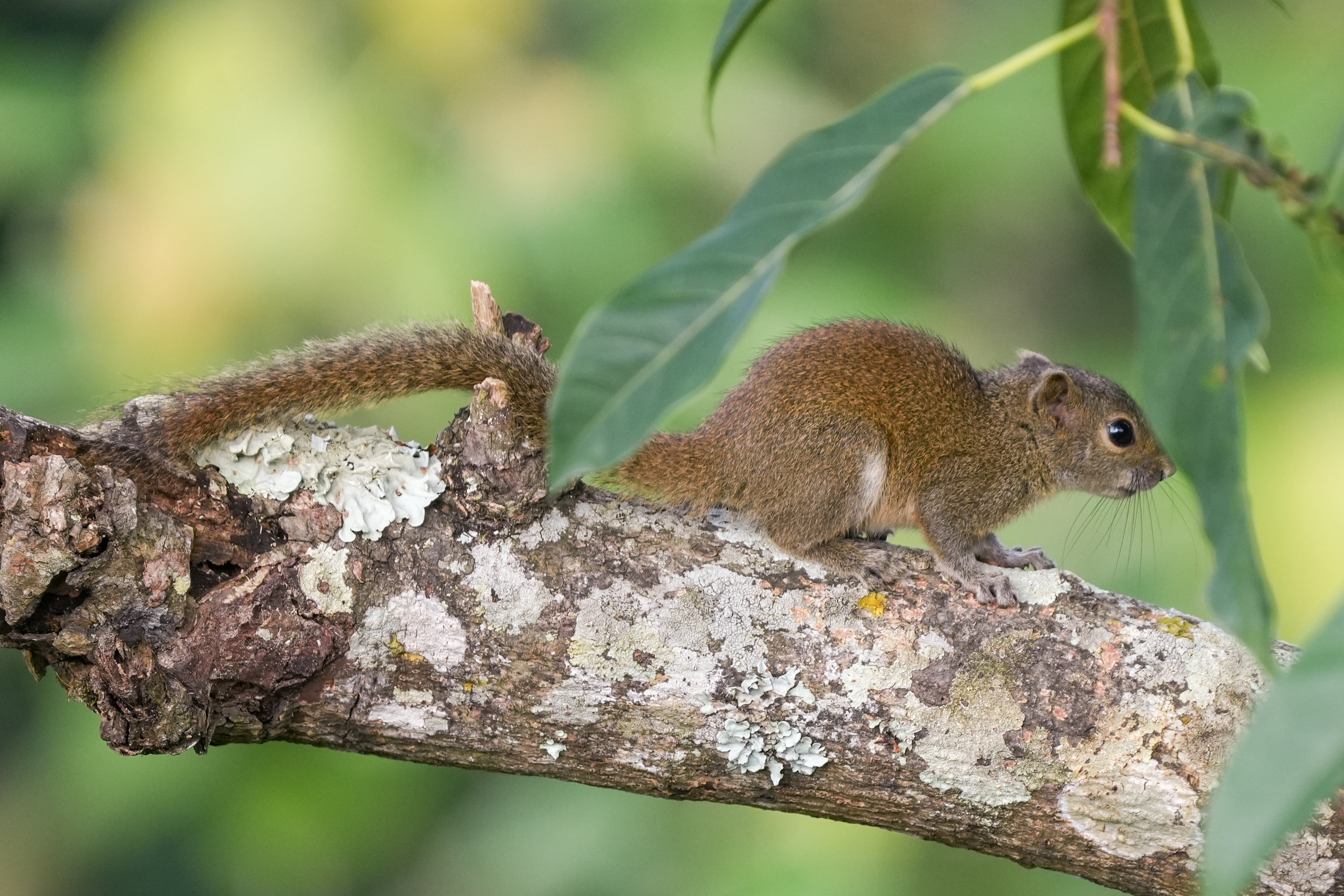
Hoary-bellied Himalayan squirrel (Callosciurus pygerythrus)

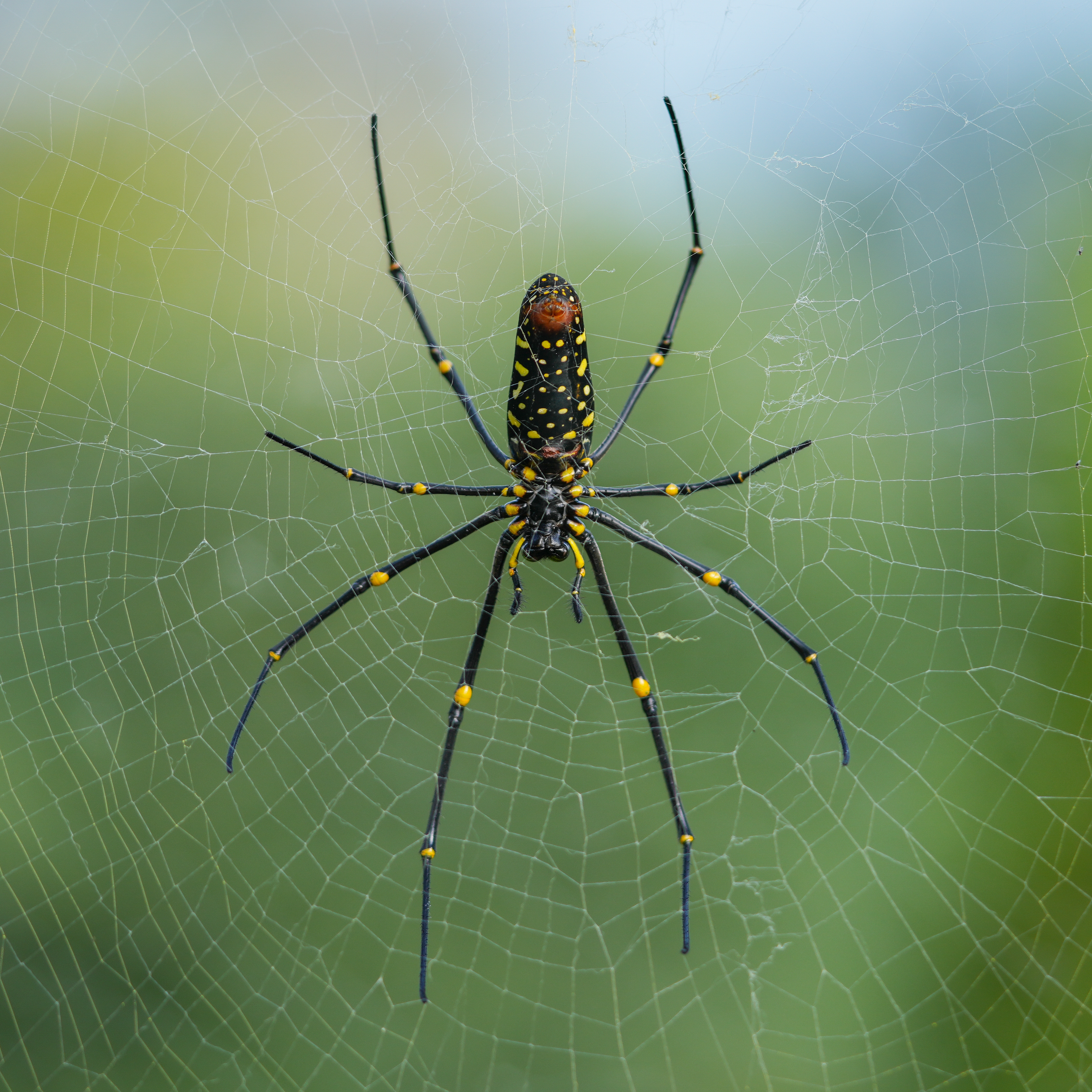
Golden orb weaver female (Nephila pilipes)
