= Seng Khasi Movement =

Socio-cultural movement in Meghalaya, India

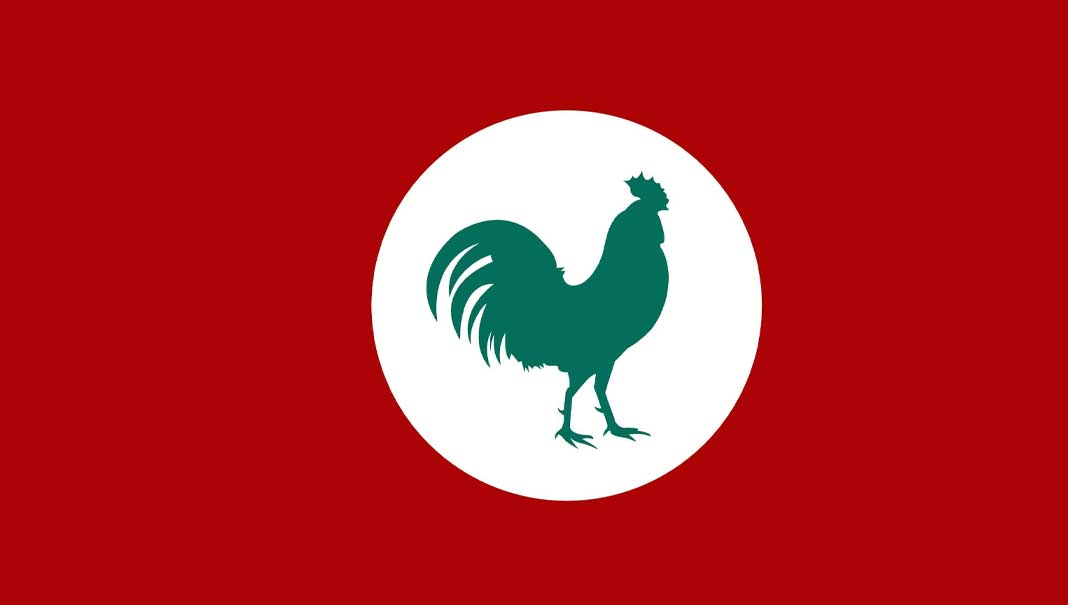
- Founded: November 23, 1899
- Country: India
- Active regions: Meghalaya
- Ideology: Promoting Khasi interests

The Seng Khasi movement is a socio-cultural movement in the northeast Indian state of Meghalaya. The movement supports the protection and preservation of Khasi culture and Niam Khasi, their traditional religion.

== History ==
The Seng Khasi movement began in Mawkhar, Shillong on November 23, 1899. It was founded by 16 young Khasi men under the guidance and mentorship of U Babu Jeebon Roy, an educationist, entrepreneur and advocate of indigenous beliefs and culture of the time. The sixteen founders were concerned about the loss of traditional Khasi culture and values due to the influence of British colonial rule and Christian missionaries.

The Seng Khasi started with one unit in 1899, but today there are over 300 branches spread across the Khasi Hills. The Seng Khasi are highly respected and universally acknowledged as custodians of the Khasi Way of Life. The Seng Khasi movement is one of the oldest and most respected cultural preservation movements in India, particularly among Tribal communities.

It has persevered for over a century now to preserve the ancient traditions, cultural dances, traditional music, arts and crafts of the Khasis. The Seng Khasi also lays great emphasis on keeping alive Khasi spirituality and the ancient wisdom of the indigenous faith.

The Seng Khasi movement remains an important and influential force in the Khasi Hills region, and continues to play a key role in creating awareness and pride in the Khasi culture and religion. The Seng Khasi is apolitical and is not involved in any matters political in nature. However, the Seng Khasi strives to gain recognition for the indigenous faith, Niam Khasi. Its adherents are denied several benefits due to this imbalance. The movement focuses on advocating for the rights and interests of the Khasi people within the framework of the Indian constitutional system.

== Activities ==
The Seng Khasi organise the Khasi religious dance known as the 'Shad Suk Mynsiem' (Dance of Peaceful Hearts). This dance was first performed in the renowned Weiking Ground in 1911. Nowadays, various branches organise the dance, which is held every weekend in different parts of the country from February until late June.

The dance has existed since time immemorial, but it was deemed pagan and devil worship by the British and their missionaries. However, it is now a source of pride for the Khasi people. Several other dances and their accompanying music have been revived across the state, inspired by the tireless efforts of the Seng Khasi. One of the Seng Khasi's most significant contributions in recent decades has been the revival of the annual pilgrimage to the summit of the sacred peak, U Lum Sohpetbneng ('Navel of the Heavens'). On the first Sunday in February each year, a sea of devotees ascends to the sacred peak, which is believed to be the origin point of mankind on Earth. According to Khasis belief, seven families known as ‘U Hynñiewtrep’ descended to Earth to spread truth and nurture Mother Earth via a golden vine bridge known as ‘Ka Jingkieng Ksiar’.

The movement has also worked to promote education and development in the Khasi Hills region, laying special emphasis on teaching traditional values alongside normal curriculums. Despite its many accomplishments, the Seng Khasi movement has faced its share of challenges.
