= Operation Roukhala =

Operation Roukhala was an ethnic cleansing operation launched by the All Tripura Tiger Force (ATTF) for the eviction of Bengali Hindus from Tripura in the late 1990s and early 2000s. The word Roukhala in Kokborok literally means ouster or deportation or driving out. In the early stages of the movement, the ATTF and the National Liberation Front of Tripura (NLFT) separately issued quit notices to the Bengali Hindus. The ATTF named it as Operation Roukhala. Later NLFT joined the movement. According to the political leaders in Tripura, the rebels resort to abduction and murder of non-tribals in the Tripura Tribal Areas Autonomous District Council (TTAADC) area as a part of Operation Roukhala.

In March 1996, the ATTF issued a notice stating that those who entered Tripura after 15 October 1949 and whose names did not appear on the electoral rolls should quit Tripura by 30 June 1996. It called a 10-day statewide strike starting from 1 July 1996 in support of its demand. The code name of the eviction of such people was code named 'Operation Roukhala'. NLFT opposed the 10-day strike by ATTF and ensured no traffic blockade in the highways. A Bengali Hindu organization by the name of Bengal Volunteers reacted to this quit notice and threatened to annihilate the tribal leaders. In June 1997, ATTF chief Ranjit Debbarma threatened to resume Operation Roukhala from 1 July to evict whom they believe to be foreigners in Tripura.

In 1999, Badal Choudhury, the Minister of Agriculture of Tripura stated that the Tripura rebels were trying to forcibly evict the Bengali Hindus from the TTAADC area to intensify their demand for a separate state. In May 2003, the ATTF and the Nayanbashi Jamatia faction of the NLFT joined hands to resume Operation Roukhala. In January 2005, the Nayanbasi Jamatia faction of NLFT joined hands with Biswamohan Debbarma faction of NLFT and Ranjit Debbarma of ATTF to launch a new organization called the Royal Supreme Council, with the aim of evicting non-tribals from TTAADC area, whom they consider as infiltrators. The newly established front wished to launch Operation Roukhala soon.

== See also ==
- Bongal Kheda
- Beh Dkhar
- Mayang Halo
