= List of wars involving India =

This is a list of military operations conducted by the British Indian Empire (1858–1947) and the post-independence Dominion of India (1947–1950) and the modern Republic of India (since 1950), including total wars, limited operations, and counter-insurgency missions both domestically and abroad.

== British Indian Empire (1858–1947) ==
British Indian victory
Another result*
British Indian defeat

*e.g. settlement, withdrawal of troops, ceasefire or inconclusive

Conflict	India and Allies	Opponent(s)	Result, casualties, and losses of India and Opponent(s)
Second Opium War (1856–1860)	United Kingdom: India; France	China	Victory: Treaties of Tientsin.
Ambela Campaign (1863–1864)	India	Afghan Pashtuns: Yousafzai tribe	Defeat: Failure to subdue Afghan tribal area; Forced British withdrawal from Buner
Bhutan War (1864–1865)	India	Bhutan	Victory: Bhutanese territorial cessions to India.
British Expedition to Abyssinia (1867–1868)	United Kingdom: India	Ethiopian Empire	Victory: British victory at the Battle of Magdala, Theodore II commits suicide.
Second Anglo-Afghan War (1878–1880)	United Kingdom: India	Afghanistan	Victory: Treaty of Gandamak, British objectives attained.; Afghanistan's tribal frontier areas annexed into British India.; Afghanistan becomes a British Protectorate.
Mahdist War (1881–1899)	Congo Free State; United Kingdom: India; Egypt; Ethiopia	Mahdist Sudan	Victory: Sudan became an Anglo-Egyptian condominium.
Anglo-Egyptian War (1882)	United Kingdom: India; Tewfik Pasha	Ahmed Orabi	Victory: Ahmed Orabi exiled, British occupation of Egypt.
Third Anglo-Burmese War (1885)	India	Burmese Empire	Victory: The province of Burma became part of India.
Third Black Mountain Expedition (1888)	India	Yousafzai: Hassanzai; Akazai	Victory: Allaiwal village of Pokal occupied and destroyed.
Sikkim Expedition (1888)	India	Tibet	Victory: Tibetan forces expelled from Sikkim.
Hunza-Nagar Campaign (1891)	India	Hunza; Nagar	Victory: The British gained control of Hunza and Nagar.
Chitral Expedition (1895)	India	Chitralis Bajouri and Afghan Tribesmen	Victory: Fort of Chitral relieved.
Anglo-Zanzibar War (1896)	Britain: India	Zanzibar Sultanate	Victory: End of the Sultanate of Zanzibar.; Zanzibar ceded to the British Empire.
Tochi Expedition (1896)	India	Waziri	Victory: Rebellion put down.
Siege of Malakand (1897)	India	پشتون Pashtun tribes	Victory: Rebellion defeated
First Mohmand Campaign (1897–1898)	India	Mohmand	Victory: Punitive expedition successful.
Tirah Campaign (1897–1898)	India	Afridi; Orakzai; Tsamkani	Victory: Negotiations for peace were then begun with the Afridis.
Boxer Rebellion (1899–1901)	Empire of Japan (Russian Empire) Russia (British Empire) United Kingdom: India; France; United States (German Empire) Germany; Austria-Hungary (Kingdom of Italy) Italy	Yihetuan Movement; China	Victory: The rebellion was suppressed.; Signing of the Boxer Protocol.; Provisions for foreign troops to be stationed in Beijing.
Second Boer War (1899–1902)	United Kingdom: British Cape Colony; Natal Colony; Rhodesia; Australia; India; Canada; New Zealand; Ceylon	Orange Free State; South African Republic	Victory: Treaty of Vereeniging, British sovereignty over The Orange Free State and the Transvaal.
British expedition to Tibet (1903–1904)	India	Tibet	Victory: Treaty enforced, return to status quo.
Bambatha Rebellion (1906)	United Kingdom: India	Zulu people	Victory: Rebellion suppressed
Bazar Valley Campaign (1908)	India	Zakka Khel clan of the Afridi	Victory: Rebellion suppressed
World War I (1914–1918)	France (British Empire) United Kingdom: Canada; Australia; New Zealand; India; South Africa; Russia; Italy; United States; Serbia; Montenegro; Belgium; Japan; Romania; Portugal; Hejaz (Republic of China (1912–1949)) China; Greece; Brazil; Kingdom of Nepal	Germany; Austria-Hungary; Ottoman Empire; Bulgaria	Victory: End of the German, Russian, Ottoman, and Austro-Hungarian empires; Formation of new countries in Europe and the Middle East; Transfer of German colonies and regions of the former Ottoman Empire to other powers; Establishment of the League of Nations
Allied intervention in the Russian Civil War (1918–1920)	(Russian Empire) White Movement; British Empire: United Kingdom; Canada; Australia; India; South Africa; Japan; Czechoslovakia; Greece; Poland; United States; France; Romania; Serbia; Italy (Republic of China (1912–1949)) China	Russian SFSR; Far Eastern Republic; Latvian SSR; Ukrainian SSR; Commune of Estonia; Mongolian communists	Withdrawal: Allied withdrawal from Russia.; Bolshevik victory over White Army.
Turkish War of Independence (1919–1923)	Greece: Pontic Rebels; (French Third Republic) France: French Armenian Legion; French West Africa; Armenia; United Kingdom: India; (Ottoman Empire) Istanbul Government: Kuva-yi Inzibatiye; (Kingdom of Italy) Italy; Georgia	Ankara Government: Kuva-yi Nizamiye; Kuva-yi Milliye	Defeat: Armistice of Mudanya.; Overthrow of the Ottoman sultanate.; Treaty of Lausanne.; Withdrawal of Allied forces from occupied lands of Turkey.; Establishment of the Republic of Turkey.
Third Anglo-Afghan War (1919)	United Kingdom: India	Afghanistan	Armistice: Treaty of Rawalpindi; Afghan invasion repelled.; Afghanistan regains control of external affairs.; Reaffirmation of the Durand Line.
First Waziristan Campaign (1919)	India	Waziristan	Victory: Suppression of insurrection by independent Wazir tribes.
Kuwait–Najd War (1919–1920)	(British Empire) United Kingdom: India; Kuwait	Sultanate of Nejd: Ikhwan	Victory: Ikhawan retreat.
Iraqi revolt (1920)	United Kingdom: India	Iraqi rebels	Victory: Faisal I of Iraq installed as the King of Iraq.
Malabar rebellion (1921)	India	Mappila Muslims	Victory: Rebellion suppressed.
Pink's War (1925)	India	Mahsud tribesmen	Victory: Tribal leaders accept terms.
Second Mohmand Campaign (1935)	India	Mohmand	Victory: Jirga and peace.
Second Waziristan Campaign (1936–1939)	India	Waziri tribesmen	Victory: Suppression of insurrection by independent Wazir tribes.
World War II (1939–1945): Including Anglo-Soviet invasion of Iran (1941)	Allies: (British Empire) United Kingdom; India	Axis: Japan; Azad Hind; Burma	Victory: Collapse of the Third Reich; Fall of Japanese and Italian Empires; Creation of the United Nations; Emergence of the United States and the Soviet Union as superpowers; Beginning of the Cold War
Indonesian National Revolution (1945–1947)	Netherlands; United Kingdom: India	Indonesia	British Indian withdrawal after Indian independence in 1947.; Independent India's entry into the revolution.; The Netherlands recognises Indonesian independence.
Operation Masterdom (1945–1946)	United Kingdom: India; France; Japan	Viet Minh	Victory: Start of the First Indochina War, lasting until the Geneva Conference of 1954.

== Independent India (1947–present) ==
Key—

Indian victory
Another result*
Indian defeat
Ongoing conflict

*e.g. settlement, withdrawal of troops, ceasefire or inconclusive

Conflict	India and Allies	Opponent(s)	Result, casualties, and losses of India and Opponent(s)
Indonesian National Revolution (1947-1949) Location: Dutch East Indies	Indonesia: PDRI (Note: 1948–1949, after Operation Kraai); TNI; POLRI; Japanese holdouts; India (Note: after 1947)	Netherlands (Note: from 1946): Dutch East Indies; KNIL; NICA; Pao An Tui (Note: claimed neutrality); United Kingdom (Note: until 1946): British Raj; Japan DI/TII (from 1949) FDR Small guerrilla groups	Indonesian victory: Independence of Indonesia from the Netherlands; End of Dutch rule over most parts of Indonesia, as the Dutch East Indies ceased to exist; Dutch recognition of the Indonesian independence in the Dutch-Indonesian Round Table Conference; Formation of the United States of Indonesia; Creation of the Netherlands-Indonesia Union; Netherlands cedes control of most territories of the Dutch East Indies to the United States of Indonesia
Indo-Pakistani War (1947–1948) Location: Kashmir	Dominion of India Jammu & Kashmir	Dominion of Pakistan	Ceasefire: One-third of Jammu and Kashmir controlled by Pakistan. Indian control over remainder.; Casualties and losses: 1,103–1,500 Indian Army personnel killed; 3,154–3,500 wounded.; 1,990 Jammu & Kashmir state forces killed or missing. Total military casualties: ~6,000–7,000; 1,000 Pakistani troops killed.; 5,000 tribesmen and Kashmiri rebels killed.; ~14,000 Pakistani troops, tribesmen and Kashmiri rebels wounded. Total military casualties: ~20,000
Annexation of Junagadh (1948) Location: Junagadh	Dominion of India	State of Junagadh	Indian victory: State of Junagadh annexed by the Dominion of India and incorporated into existing Saurashtra province.; Casualties and losses: Unknown
Annexation of Hyderabad (1948) Location: Hyderabad	Dominion of India	State of Hyderabad	Indian victory: Hyderabad annexed to the Dominion of India as a new Hyderabad province.; Casualties and losses: <10 Indian Army personnel killed.; 807 Hyderabad State forces killed; 1,647 captured.; 1,373 Razakars killed; 1,911 captured.
Insurgency in Northeast India (1954-Present) Location(s): Nagaland, Assam, Manipur, Mizoram, Tripura	India; Supported by: Bhutan; Bangladesh; Myanmar	Separatist group(s) from Manipur: People's Liberation Army of Manipur; Kangleipak Communist Party; People's Revolutionary Party of Kangleipak; Kanglei Yawol Kanna Lup; Maoist Communist Party of Manipur; Separatist group(s) from Assam: United Liberation Front of Asom; Kamtapur Liberation Organisation; Separatist group from Nagaland : National Socialist Council of Nagaland; Separatist group from Arunachal Pradesh: Tani Army; Trans-national separatist group: Kuki National Army Former group(s): United National Liberation Front (1964–2023); National Democratic Front of Boroland (1986–2020); National Liberation Front of Tripura (1989–2024); All Tripura Tiger Force (1990–2024); Karbi Longri N.C. Hills Liberation Front (2004–21); Bodo Liberation Tigers Force (1996-03); Zomi Revolutionary Army (1997–2005); Garo National Liberation Army (2009–18); Hynniewtrep National Liberation Council (2000–10); People's Democratic Council of Karbi Longri (2016–21); Adivasi Cobra Force (1996–2012); Mizo National Front (1954–86); Tripura National Volunteers (1978–88); Dima Halam Daogah (2009–13); United People's Democratic Solidarity (1999–2014); State Supporter: China (claimed by India); Myanmar(until 2018); Bhutan (until 2003) Non-State Supporter: CPI (Maoist)	Ongoing: Ongoing (low level insurgency); The Insurgency in Mizoram ended in 1986 following the Mizoram Peace Accord; The Insurgency in Tripura ended in 2024 following the 2024 Tripura Peace Accord
Congo Crisis (1960-65) Location: Congo	First Phase(1960–1963): (Democratic Republic of the Congo) Republic of the Congo; Supported by: United Nations(ONUC); India; Other states; Soviet Union(1960) Second Phase(1963–1965): (Democratic Republic of the Congo) Democratic Republic of the Congo; Supported by: United Nations(ONUC)(Up to 1964); India; Other states; United States; Belgium	First Phase(1960–1963): State of Katanga; South Kasai; Supported by: Belgium (Democratic Republic of the Congo) Free Republic of the Congo; Supported by: Soviet Union(post-1960–1962) Second Phase(1963–1965): Simba rebels Kwilu rebels Supported by: Soviet Union; China; Cuba	Victory: Debellation of the State of Katanga.
Annexation of Goa (1961) Location(s): Portuguese India(Goa, Daman and Diu); Arabian Sea	India	Portugal	Victory: Annexation of Goa, Daman and Diu into India.; Casualties and losses: *22 Indian soldiers killed,225 wounded; 30 Portuguese soldiers killed, 57 wounded.; 4,668 Portuguese soldiers captured.; 1 sloop lost, 1 patrol boat sunk.
China-India War (1962) Location(s): Aksai Chin; North-East Frontier Agency; Assam	India	China	Defeat: Status quo ante bellum
Indo-Pakistani War (1965) Location(s): Kashmir, Punjab, Rajasthan, Bengal, Arabian Sea	India	Pakistan	Inconclusive: United Nations mandated ceasefire; India had an upper hand in the war; No permanent territorial changes (see Tashkent Declaration)
Naxalite–Maoist insurgency (1967-2026) Location: India	India; Supported by: (until 2011): Tritiya Prastuti Committee; Salwa Judum; Sunlight Sena; Kuer Sena; Ranvir Sena; Bhumi Sena; Lorik Sena	Communist Party of India (Maoist); People's Liberation Guerrilla Army (India); Jharkhand Janmukti Parishad; People's Liberation Front of India; Former group(s): Revolutionary Communist Centre(2006–2019); Odisha Maobadi Party(2002–2015); Communist Party of India (Marxist–Leninist) Liberation (1974–1992); Lal Sena; Communist Party of India (Marxist–Leninist) Janashakti (1992–2013); Communist Party of United States of India (1997–2005); Communist Party of India (Marxist–Leninist) New Democracy; Communist Party of India (Marxist–Leninist) (Mahadev Mukherjee) (until 2012); Akhil Bharat Nepali Ekta Samaj (until 2002); TNLA; Supported by: ULFA; NSCN; PLA-MP; MCPM; KCP; Declared support: International Communist League; CPN (Maoist); CPN (2014); NPA; PBSP (until 2021); PBCP (until 2021); CIC (until 1977); CCP (Maoist) (until 1976)	Victory: Sharp decline in Maoist violence, with incidents and influence significantly reduced nationwide.; Hundreds of Maoists killed and large-scale surrenders weaken insurgent leadership and structure.; At least two Maoist commanders refuse to surrender and remain committed to continue fighting.
Nathu La and Cho La Conflict (1967) Location: Sikkim	India	China	Victory: Chinese withdrawal from the Kingdom of Sikkim
1971 JVP insurrection (1971) Location: Ceylon	(Dominion of Ceylon) Ceylon; Supported by: India; Pakistan; Soviet Union	JVP; Supported by: North Korea; Albania (arms support); China (alleged); ASBPI; CCP (Maoist)(alleged); Diplomatic support: South Yemen	Victory: Rebel forces surrender; Ceylonese government reestablishes control over entire island
Indo-Pakistani War (1971) part of the Bangladesh Liberation War Location(s): East Pakistan, Bay of Bangal; Jammu and Kashmir, Punjab, Rajasthan, Gujrat, Arabian Sea	India; Bangladesh Supported by: Soviet Union	Pakistan Supported by: United States; United Kingdom; China; Iran; Ceylon; Saudi Arabia	Victory: Pakistani surrender in East Pakistan; Independence of Bangladesh
Siachen conflict (1984-2003) Location: Siachen Glacier	India	Pakistan	Victory: Annexation of the Siachen Glacier into India following Operation Meghdoot; India captures Quaid Post / Bana Top during Operation Rajiv; Ceasefire since 2003
Insurgency in Punjab (1984-1995) Location: Punjab	India	Khalistani militants Supported by: Pakistan	Victory: Militancy defeated
The Second JVP insurrection (1987-89) Location: Sri Lanka	Sri Lanka; India	Janatha Vimukthi Peramuna	Victory: Emergency conditions in South-western and Central provinces of Sri Lanka lifted; Insurgency declined following the fall of the Eastern bloc
Indian intervention in the Sri Lankan Civil War (1987-1990) Location: Sri Lanka	India; Sri Lanka	Liberation Tigers of Tamil Eelam	Ceasefire: Withdrawal of Indian peace-keeping forces from Sri Lanka after ceasefire
Maldivian Anti-Coup Mission (1988) Location: Maldives	India; Maldives	PLOTE (Maldives) Maldivian rebels	Victory: Restoration of government rule in Maldives
Insurgency in Jammu and Kashmir (1989-Present) Location: Jammu and Kashmir	India	Pakistan-based Terrorist group(s): Lashkar-e-Taiba; The Resistance Front; Hizbul Mujahideen; Jaish-e-Mohammed; HUM; HuJI; Al-Badr; Al-Umar-Mujahideen; People's Anti-Fascist Front; Other separatist movements & insurgent militant groups; Political opponent(s): All Parties Hurriyat Conference; JIJK; Supported by: Pakistan; D-Company Al-Qaeda: AQIS; Ansar Ghazwat-ul-Hind; Islamic State: (Islamic State) IS Khorasan; (Islamic State) IS Hind	Ongoing: Ongoing low-level Insurgency; Enforcement of AFSPA in Jammu and Kashmir
United Nations Operation in Somalia II (1993–1995); The part of Somali Civil War Location: Somalia	United Nations: India; Algeria; Australia; Austria; Belgium; Botswana; Canada; Denmark; Egypt; Fiji; Finland; France; Germany; Greece; Indonesia; Ireland; Italy; Jordan; Kuwait; Malaysia; Morocco; Nepal; New Zealand; Nigeria; Norway; Pakistan; Philippines; Romania; Saudi Arabia; South Korea; Spain; Sweden; Switzerland; Tunisia; Turkey; UAE; United Kingdom; United States; Zimbabwe	(Somalia) Somali National Alliance; Al-Itihaad al-Islamiya (Somalia) Somali National Front	UNOSOM II failure
Kargil War (1999) Location(s): Ladakh, Jammu and Kashmir	India	Pakistan: Non-state allies: United Jihad Council; Lashkar-e-Taiba; Hizbul Mujahideen; Jaish-e-Mohammed; HUM; HuJI; Al-Badr; Al-Umar-Mujahideen; Afghan mercenaries	Indian victory: India regains possession of Kargil; Status quo ante bellum
Operation Ocean Shield (2009-2016) Location(s): Indian Ocean, Gulf of Aden, Guardafui Channel, Arabian Sea, Red Sea	NATO: Denmark; United Kingdom; United States; France; Netherlands; Spain; Greece; Romania; Germany; Belgium; Canada; Italy; Portugal; Turkey; Norway; Non-NATO: India Others: Indonesia; Japan; Malaysia; New Zealand; Oman; Pakistan; Peru; Philippines; Russia; Saudi Arabia; Seychelles; Singapore; South Africa; South Korea; Taiwan; Thailand; Ukraine; Yemen	Somali pirates	Allied victory
China–India skirmishes (2020-21) Location: Ladakh	India	China	Stalemate: 2,000 km^{2} of India-claimed territory was estimated to have been taken over by China since May 2020.
India-Pakistan conflict (2025) Location(s): India, Pakistan	India	Pakistan	Ceasefire

== See also ==
- Afghan–Sikh Wars
- List of wars involving the Mughal Empire
- Battles involving the Maratha Empire
- List of wars involving Delhi Sultanate
- List of Anglo-Indian Wars
- Indian Army United Nations peacekeeping missions

== Sources ==
- Bangash, Yaqoob Khan (2010), "Three Forgotten Accessions: Gilgit, Hunza and Nagar", The Journal of Imperial and Commonwealth History, 38 (1): 117–143, doi:10.1080/03086530903538269, S2CID 159652497
- Barua, Pradeep (2005). The State at War in South Asia. University of Nebraska Press. ISBN 978-0-8032-1344-9.
- Brown, William (30 November 2014). Gilgit Rebelion: The Major Who Mutinied Over Partition of India. Pen and Sword. ISBN 978-1-4738-2187-3.
- Jamal, Arif (2009). Shadow War: The Untold Story of Jihad in Kashmir. Melville House. ISBN 978-1-933633-59-6.
- Massey, Reginald (2005). Azaadi!. Abhinav Publications. ISBN 978-81-7017-469-1.
