= Singicherra massacre =

2002 massacre in India

Singicherra Massacre
- Location: Singicherra, Khowai subdivision, Tripura, India
- Date: 13 January 2002
- Target: Bengali Hindus
- Attack type: Massacre
- Weapon: Guns
- Deaths: 16
- Injuries: 9
- Perpetrator: National Liberation Front of Tripura insurgents

Singicherra Massacre, also known as Singicherra No. 2 Bazaar Massacre, refers to the massacre of 16 unarmed Bengali Hindu villagers on 13 January 2002 at Singicherra by the terrorists of National Liberation Front of Tripura.

== History ==
On 13 January 2002, on the eve of Makar Sankranti, Bengali people came to Singicherra market of Khowai subdivision for purchasing purpose. Suddenly two groups of National Liberation Front of Tripura insurgents encircled the market in the evening and sprayed bullets indiscriminately killing 16 Bengali people on the spot and injuring 9.
