= Insurgency in Tripura =

Armed conflict

- Part of Insurgency in Northeast India
- Location of Tripura in the map of India
Date	1989 – 4 September 2024 (35 years)
Location	Tripura, India
Status	Indian Government victory: Tripura Peace Accord signed between rebel groups and Indian Government; 2024 Tripura Peace Accord signed in September 4, 2024 between NLFT, ATTF and the Indian Government ending the insurgency.
Territorial changes	Indian government recaptures the territory seized by rebels and withdraws AFSPA from Tripura in 2015.

Belligerents
India; Bangladesh	TNV (until 1988); NLFT (until 2024); ATTF (until 2024); BNCT (until 2008)

Commanders and leaders
(India) Ramaswamy Venkataraman (India) Shankar Dayal Sharma (India) Kocheril Raman Narayanan (India) APJ Abdul Kalam (India) Pratibha Patil (India) Pranab Mukherjee	Bijoy Kumar Hrangkhawl (surrendered); Biswamohan Debbarma (POW); Nayanbasi Jamatia (POW); Ranjit Debbarma (POW); Dhananjoy Reang (surrendered)

Strength
28,031 Police Personnel	850-1,500 (NLFT); 200-400 (ATTF)

Casualties and losses
2000–2024: 214 killed	2000–2024: 355 killed 1,106 Arrested; 3,824 Surrendered
- 2000–2024: 704 civilians killed
- 1997: Dhananjoy Reang surrendered. 2008: Nayanbasi Jamatia arrested in Bangladesh. 2012: Biswamohan Debbarma and Ranjit Debbarma arrested in Bangladesh. 2013: Nayanbasi Jamatia handed over to the Indian government. 2017: Biswamohan Debbarma and Ranjit Debbarma handed over to the Indian government.

The insurgency in Tripura was an armed conflict which took place in the state of Tripura between India and several separatist rebel organisations. It was a part of the wider insurgency in Northeast India and was fueled by Tripuris.

== Background ==
Tripura, literally meaning "land adjoining water", is located in the extreme southwest corner of the Northeast. Following India's independence in 1947, Tripura acceded to the Indian Union in 1948 as a "C" category state. It became a Union Territory in November 1956 and attained full statehood on 21 January 1972.

Tripura's demography underwent a major change as a result of illegal migrants and refugees from former East Bengal and subsequently from Bangladesh. Tripuris were pushed to the hills and the politics and administration in the state became dominated by the Bengali-speaking and immigrants.

It was the particular reason which had created national consciousness among the local populations. The continuous neglect on the immigration issue had led to a direct confrontation between Indian nationalism and the newly created Tripuri nationalism. The parallel rise of nationalism in the other states of the Northeast India had further complicated the situation more, resulting in a deadly armed conflict between India and rebel groups thus, creating the insurgency on ethnic lines as a Tribal versus Bengali conflict.

The first militant outfit to form was Tripura National Volunteers (TNV). It was active until 1988. However, most prominent ones were National Liberation Front of Tripura (NLFT) and All Tripura Tiger Force (ATTF).

These groups had various demands. NLFT wanted to establish an independent Tripura and ATTF wanted to finalise the Tripura merger agreement. However, all of them wished to remove Bangladeshis immigrants who had entered Tripura after 1950 despite their ideological differences.

Anti-Bengali sentiments of Tripuri rebel groups had given birth to the United Bengali Liberation Front. The group wanted to protect Bengalis in Tripura from militants. This group was supported by the Bengali dominated Communist Party which supplied arms and infrastructure.

Internal conflicts among them had divided NLFT into NLFT(B) led by Biswamohan Debbarma and NLFT(N) led by Nayanbasi Jamatia. ATTF which was a right wing organisation of NLFT had become its own militant organisation led by Ranjit Debbarma.

Those groups had received the major blow when Biswamohan Debbarma, Nayanbasi Jamatia and Ranjit Debbarma were all arrested in their hideout camps in Bangladesh. It is estimated that some of those armed cadres are still present at their hideout camps at Chittagong Hill Tracts, Bangladesh.
