= 1997 ethnic violence and displacement of Bru-Reang =

Ethnic violence and displacement of Bru/Reang community from Mizoram in 1997

1997 ethnic violence and displacement of Bru Reang
- Part of Ethnic conflict in Northeast India
Date	October 1997
Location	Mizoram (Mamit, Kolasib, and Lunglei districts); displacement to Tripura
Status	~35,000–40,000 displaced; partial repatriation and later permanent resettlement in Tripura

Belligerents
Mizo civil society groups (alleged)	Bru / Reang community

Commanders and leaders
	Bru National Liberation Front (BNLF)

1997 Bru-Reang ethnic violence and displacement refers to a period of ethnic violence in the Indian Mizoram during October 1997, which resulted in the mass displacement of approximately 35,000–40,000 members of the Bru (Reang) tribe to refugee camps in North Tripura.

== Background ==
The Bru or Reang people are an indigenous tribal community primarily inhabiting Mizoram, Tripura, Assam, and Manipur. They are classified as a Scheduled Tribe in India. Traditionally, a significant portion of the Bru community followed animist or Hindu-influenced indigenous practices, worshipping deities such as Tuibuma and Mailoma. The Bru-Reang people historically inhabited north and central Tripura , the Mizo districts of Aizawl, Lunglei and Chhimtuipui, Rangamati in Bangladesh and Karimganj in Assam.

Historically, the Brus were both minorities in Mizoram and Tripura and thus underdeveloped and marginalized. Sadhan Sengupta of the archaeological Survey of India visited the Bru dominated areas between 1982-1984 and discovered that there was a complete lack of tube wells or passable roads and a lack of effective funding for rural development. With this reason, the Bru further claimed that as a minority population they were neglected in government jobs, education and community development policies. Furthermore, the Bru lacked political representation. Despite a significant population in Mizoram the Bru never won a single representative in the state government of Mizoram. Reforms and changes to the Bru's political opportunities were introduced in the 1980s regarding education. In 1989, the Reang People's Union (RPU) was formed by three Bru leaders, Sawibunga, Lalringthanga and Ramawia.

The RPU submitted a memorandum to the Mizorfam government demanding inclusion of Kau Bru programming on the state radio network, reservation of jobs for the Brus in state government and nomination of a Bru to the legislative assembly. The RPU transitioned into the Bru Socio-Cultural ORganisation in 1990 and formed the Reang Democratic Convetnion Party. The Reang Democratic COnvention Party was made for the preservation of Bru culture and language and coordinated along the Tripura Bru organisations into a common ethnic name "Bru".

The Reang Democratic Convention Party failed in contesting district and state elections despite supporting the Indian National Congress. Congress instead ignored Bru demands for an autonomous district council and this led the RDCP to align with the Bharatiya Janata Party which would be in vain as they would still lack political representation. In 1994, the Bru National Union (BNU) was formed which led to widespreadprotests against the exclusion of Bru citizens from electoral rolls.

The BNU demanded for the creation of an autonomous district council to protect and preserve the cultural identity of the Brus and a demand of three reserved seats in the Mizoram Legislative Assembly. This demand was opposed by Mizo civil society organisations, including the Young Mizo Association and Mizo Zirlai Pawl, who asserted that the Bru were not indigenous to Mizoram and should be excluded from state electoral rolls.

Religion also played a significant role in the escalation of tensions. While over 90% of Mizoram's population are Christian, many Brus continued to practice Hindu or traditional animist beliefs. Some Bru leaders claimed they faced discrimination or pressure to convert, particularly from missionary schools. About 70% of the Bru-Reang people are Hindu and the remaining are Christians.

In January 2017, a Tripura-based group, the Bru Hindu Joint Coordination Committee (BHJCC), petitioned the Union Home Ministry to safeguard the community’s Hindu or indigenous faith while repatriation talks were underway.

== Events ==
Tensions arose when the Mizoram government declared an area of the Dampa Forest, a historical Bru area, to be the location of the state's tiger sanctuary. This led to protests from the BNU as it would result in uncompensated displacement of the inhabitants. As a result, Bru youth took up arms and forced the Bru National Liberation Front (BNLF). In September 1997, the BNU passed a resolution demanding an autonomous district council in Mizoram under the sixth schedule. This led to the Mizo Zirlai Pawl (MZP) to oppose the political demands of the BNU and reported to have stated that:

if the Reangs want to divide or disintegrate Mizoram further, it would be better that they go away. The resolution demanding Autonomous District Council (ADC) could not be accepted by MZP. If the Reangs go ahead with their plan, the MZP was ready to fight against such a demand. Mizoram is the only land the Mizos have, and it could not be lost to foreigners or other communities.

— MZP, Conflicts in the Northeast: Internal and External Effects

On 21 October 1997, militants associated with the BNLF killed a Mizo forest guard in Mizoram’s Mamit district, triggering retaliatory violence. Mizo groups reportedly torched Bru villages in Mamit, Kolasib, and Lunglei districts. Bru sources claimed that around 1,391 houses in 41 villages were burned, while official estimates put the number at 325 houses in 16 villages. Allegations of killings and sexual violence were also raised, though unconfirmed by state authorities. Crops were also destroyed and sexual assault of Bru women occurred during the violence retaliated by Mizos. In response to ethnic cleansing, 40000 Brus fled as refugees to Tripura and Hailakandi in Assam.

== Displacement and camp conditions ==
Following the violence, approximately 35,000–40,000 Bru individuals fled to North Tripura and were settled in six relief camps: Asapara, Naisingpara, Hazacherra, Kaskau, Khakchangpara, and Hamsapara. The camps were understaffed and lacked resources such as food, medicine and adequate shelter, leading to deaths of the refugees. The most egregious deaths were mass outbreaks of Malaria and diarrhoea, which claimed hundreds of Brus. The lack of water infrastructure in the camps meant that potable water like streams and wells dry up before the monsoon. Children were made to claim down 2-3km pits to collect waters and trek uphills.

Official rations are allot adults with 600g of rice and ₹5 a day. Minors get half of this amount. Clothes for refugees are distributed to everyone once a year. The refugees collect wild potatoes, different types of fruits and edible forest stems to satisfy food resource strains. Sanitation is poor in the camps with no bathroom or toilets. Refugees bathe in rivulets and use the forest for ablutions.

The camps have seen a baby boom but without any schools, the state government engaged 72 teachers in the refugee camps at a rate of ₹1,000 a month, but without school buildings the teaching efforts have been ineffective. The President of the Bru Displaced Peoples Forum, Elvis Chorkhy, states that all refugee individuals except newborns possess citizenship certificates, bankbook and birth certificates of belonging to Mizoram.

A 2018 survey by the National Commission for Protection of Child Rights and the Quality Council of India noted widespread malnutrition, early marriage, and substance abuse among camp youth.

== Rehabilitation and resettlement ==
Peace talks were held with the BNLF and the Mizoram government on September 7 2001 and finalized on 26 April 2005 where the BNLF laid down its arms in return for amnesty and reptariation. The agreement further saw the change of the term Reang to Bru in the listing of scheduled tribes, immediate placement of returning refugees on the electoral rolls and fast development of Bru areas of western Mizoram. Mizo youth groups such as the Mizo Zirlai Pawl (MZP) and Young Mizo Association (YMA) have objected to the repatriation of all Brus in refugee camps. The argument is made that they should only be reptariated if they were registered in the 1995 voter's list. However, the Bru argue that the disenfranchisement of Brus in the 1990s makes this more difficult to achieve.

Mizo leaders such as Lalthanhawla have argued the Brus are not native to Mizoram and only migrated a few decades ago and hence lack the right for political demands. Between 2009 and 2019, several repatriation efforts were initiated, resulting in around 5,407 families returning to Mizoram. However, most camp residents declined to return, citing inadequate assurances for safety, livelihood, and cultural respect. Chorkhy on behalf of the BDPF argues that the Brus should be granted a tribal council similar to the Chakma, Lai and Mara. Repatriation agreements were signed on 31 April 2009 between the then Chief Minister Lalthanhawla and the Mizo Bru Displaced People's Forum. Chorkhy however claims that the names of Brus were struck off the electoral lists in the assembly election of May 2009 to further discredit their settlement in Mizoram. The initiative eventually stalled in November 2009.

On 16 January 2020, a quadripartite agreement was signed among the Government of India, Government of Tripura, Government of Mizoram, and Bru leaders. This agreement provided for permanent resettlement of over 30,000 displaced Brus in Tripura, along with land, financial assistance, and citizenship documentation.

== Impact and ongoing issues ==
The protracted displacement led to severe developmental challenges, identity insecurity, and social marginalisation of the Bru community. Reports in 2024 indicated persistent struggles in rehabilitation colonies, including education gaps, mental health stress, and lack of political integration.

== See also ==
- Bru people
- Bongal Kheda
- Exodus of Kashmiri Hindus

== Sources ==
- Pereira, Melvil; Kashyap, Furzee (16 June 2023). "Land as Foundation of Identity: The Case of the Brus in Mizoram". In Das, Amiya Kumar; Kikhi, Kedilezo; Dutta, Piyashi (eds.). Indigeneity, Citizenship and the State: Perspectives from India's Northeast. New York: Routeledge. ISBN 9781003406259.
- Bhattacharya, Udayon (2011). "Ramifications of Conflicts in Tripura and Mizoram". In Hazarika, Sanjoy; Raghavan, V.R. (eds.). Conflicts in the Northeast: Internal and External Effects. New Delhi: Vij Books India Pvt Ltd.
