= Bongal Kheda =

Movement against the Bengali Hindus in Assam, India

Bongal Kheda (trans. "Drive out the Bengalis) was a nationalistic and anti-Bengali movement in Assam, India, orchestrated by native Assamese job seekers which aimed to purge out non-native job competitors — primarily, middle-class Hindu Bengalis. Assam has long been anti-Bengali and after the Independence of India, the Assamese Hindu middle class gained political control in Assam and tried to gain social and economic parity with their competitors, the Bengali Hindu middle class. A significant period of property damage, ethnic policing and even instances of street violence occurred in the region. The exact timeline is disputed, though many authors agree the 1960s saw a height of disruption. It was part of a broader discontent within Assam that would foreshadow the Assamese Language Movement and the anti-Bangladeshi Assam Movement.

== Background ==
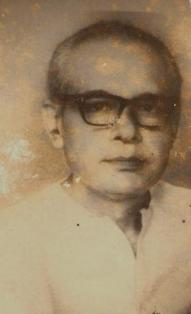
Robin Dey, an ethnic Bengali Hindu writer of Assamese language teenage literature was forced to leave Assam.

Beginning in 1826, the British East India Company gradually brought the entire Northeast India under control and included Assam in the Bengal Presidency. Over time educated elite Bengali Hindus began occupying colonial administrative and professional positions, locally they were called as Babus and the emerging and insecure Assamese nationalists began looking at both the British as well as this class of Bengalis as outsiders. The concern for rapidly increasing number of refugees arriving from East Bengal and later newly formed East Pakistan in the 1940s, created tension among the local Assamese people and many tribes in the state. The first influx of Hindu refugees in considerable number was in October 1946 following the Noakhali riots. By May 1949 the number of total refugees reached two-and-half lakhs increasing up to 2,74,455. In May 1948, ethnic tension escalated between the Assamese people and the Bengali Hindus in the Paan bazaar area of Guwahati, which soon spread to different parts of Assam. Bengali-owned shops were looted in Guwahati. Abusive wall graffiti were put out across the streets of Guwahati such as "Who ate all the fish?, the Bengalis! So out with them." In 1956, there were widespread disturbances in the erstwhile undivided Goalpara district, when the States Reorganization Commission visited the district to ascertain the feasibility of the district's merger with West Bengal. Sarat Chandra Sinha, the Congress MLA who would later be the Chief minister of Assam, is known to have rallied in different parts of Goalpara district and made provocative speeches against the Bengali Hindus, instigating mob violence against them. Around 250 Bengali medium schools were converted to Assamese medium schools overnight. As per a letter by PM Jawaharlal Nehru to the Assam government, at least one Bengali Hindu was stabbed.

Annual Arrival of Refugees in Assam in 1946–1951 −
Place of Origin	Year	Number
East Bengal	1946	8,593
East Bengal	1947	42,346
East Bengal	1948	41,740
East Bengal	1949	33,138
East Bengal	1950	1,44,51−
East Bengal	1950 (Jan.&Feb.)	3,479
West Pakistan	-	647
	Total	2,74,455

Arrival of Hindu Refugees from East Pakistan after 1951
Year	Population	Reason
(1952–1958)	2,12,545	1950 East Pakistan riots
(1964–1968)	10,68,455	1964 East Pakistan riots
1971	3,47,555	Bangladesh Liberation War
Total	16,28,555	Overall immigration are caused due to communal disturbance

== Attacks ==
A Bengali Hindu refugee child being taken aboard a lorry at Alipurduar.

The attacks on the Bengali Hindus started in June 1960. It first started at the Cotton College in Guwahati and then spread to the rest of the state. Assamese mob attacked Bengali Hindu settlements in the Brahmaputra Valley. There were reports of stone-throwing by Assamese in a Bengali neighbourhood called Das Colony in Maligaon area. A petrol pump on the main road between Maligaon and Guwahati, the largest city in Assam, was set on fire. The Assamese people felt that the fewer Bengalis within their territory, the better. The 1979 agitation witnessed frequent curfews and strikes called by the All Assam Students Union (AASU) and other organisations belonging to the local community. At least twenty young Bengali men in Maligaon were murdered. One incident that happened where a young Assamese man, a school dropout in his early 20s, who used to reside in Maligaon locality. He stabbed his own childhood Bengali friend, who had just joined the Indian Air Force, to death in the middle of the street. Violence took place in 25 villages of Goreswar in Kamrup district. A one-man enquiry commission was set up under Justice Gopal Mehrotra. According to the report at least 150 Bengalis were killed and more than three thousand were severely injured. There were several incidents of attacks on women. 4,019 huts and 58 houses belonging to the Bengalis were vandalised and destroyed. The District Magistrate of Guwahati who happened to be a Bengali Hindu was attacked by a mob of around 100 people inside his residence and stabbed. The Deputy Inspector General of Police, also a Bengali Hindu was also stabbed. The Bengali students of Guwahati University, Dibrugarh Medical College and Assam Medical College were forcibly expelled from the institutions. In Dibrugarh, the Bengali Hindus were attacked in the mixed localities. Bengali Hindu houses were looted, burnt and the occupants were beaten up, knifed and driven out. On 31 August 2019, the names of more than 13 lakh Bengalis were removed from the final list of N. R. C. based on 1971.

== Displacement ==
Thousands of Bengali Hindus were displaced from the Brahmaputra Valley and they subsequently migrated to West Bengal. According to one estimate 500,000 Bengalis were displaced from Assam. In West Bengal, thousands of refugees arrived in phases. The first batch of around 4,000 refugees arrived between 5 and 11 July 1960. The next batch of 447 arrived between 12 and 20 July. The rest arrived after 31 July. During July – September, around 50,000 Bengalis took shelter in West Bengal.

Robin Dey, the Bengali-born creator of teenage adventure series of Dasyu Bhaskar in Assam was forced to leave Assam and settle in Kolkata. In 1959, Sukomal Purakayastha, who was later martyred during the Bengali Language Movement in 1961, was forced to wind up his business in Dibrugarh and flee to Barak Valley.

Cumulative refugee figures from Assam in Jalpaiguri district, West Bengal
Date	Cumulative figures
16 July 1960	9,365
1 August 1960	8,975
21 August 1960	10,043
25 August 1960	50,000

== Aftermath ==
=== Language Movement ===
In 1972, large scale ethnic riots erupted in Assam again when Assamese groups demanded for making Assamese the sole language for writing examinations under the prestigious Gauhati university, where as usual the Bengali Hindus were mostly targeted. This time the violence remained concentrated mostly in the lower Assam districts with minor outbreaks reported in Sibsagar and Dibrugarh. Around 14,000 Bengali Hindus fled to West Bengal and elsewhere in the North East.

=== Assam Movement ===
Assamese mob drawing wall graffiti where Jyoti Basu, the then Chief Minister of West Bengal is described as the Bastard son of West Bengal and Bengalis as Indian dogs .

During the first phase of the Assam Agitation, Bengali settlements were attacked throughout the Brahmaputra Valley. The killing of Rabi Mitra, an ethnic Bengali technical officer at Oil India's headquarters in Duliajan caused widespread panic among the Bengalis. In 1983, the Bengali Hindus were attacked again during the anti-foreign agitation. In Dhemaji district, the Bengali houses were vandalised by rioting Assamese mobs in Silapathar. Cases have been reported when tribals (Mishing people) were instigated to attack government sanctioned Bengali Hindu refugee settlements in the Lakhimpur district, resulting in horrendous massacres where Bengali babies were snatched from their mothers and thrown to fire, alive. Extremely abusive graffiti targeting Bengali Hindus became a common hate spreading mechanism for the Assamese rioters. "If you see a snake and a Bengali, kill the Bengali first", "Assam for Assamese", etc. were easily seen written on the graffitied walls across the Brahmaputra valley. The Khasi tribals of Meghalaya, under the banner of Khasi Students Union (KSU) and under active collaboration and patronage of the Assamese rioters started targeting domicile Bengalis in Meghalaya, resenting their dominance in jobs and business. The attacks mostly restricted to Shillong. In 1980, a Bengali legislator was killed and the Bengali localities came under systematic attack repeatedly.

== See also ==
- Bongal
- Beh Dkhar
- Mayang Halo
- Anti-Bengali sentiment
- Operation Roukhala
- D voter
- Nellie massacre
- Bengali Language Movement (Barak Valley)
- Bengali Hindus in Assam
