= Chitta Maharaj =

Indian spiritual guru

- Born: Chitta Ranjan Debbarma; 22 January 1962 (age 63); Uatlok Twithu, Tripura, India
- Known for: Prominent of Spirituality
- Honors: Padma Shri (2024); Karmayogi Award (2021)

Chitta Maharaj (born Chitta Ranjan Debbarma, 22 January 1962) is an Indian spiritual guru and head of the Shanti Kali Ashram. He was honored with the Karmayogi Award in 2021 for his contribution towards tribal welfare, health and organic agriculture, social upliftment, education in remote and tribal areas of Tripura through spiritual and education. In 2024, he was awarded the Padma Shri (2024), the fourth-highest civilian award in India.

== Early life ==
Chitta Ranjan Debbarma was born into a farmer Tripuri family on 22 January 1962 in Borokathal under West Tripura District of Tripura. Having successfully passed the matriculation-level examination, Chittaranjan Debbarma interviewed and secured the position of a panchayat secretary. While a Panchayat Secretary, he met Gurudev Shanti Kali during a trip. Fascinated by Gurudev Shanti Kali ethos of spirituality, Chittaranjan became his disciple, embracing spiritual teachings that deeply influenced his outlook and choosing to leave his family behind, he decided to embrace the ascetic life and becoming a sanyasi and a devoted disciple of Tripura Sundari under the wise guidance of his guru.

== Awards ==
- Padma Shri in 2024
