= Mayang (term) =

Mayang is a term used by Manipuri in Manipur to refer to non-Manipuri Indians, especially Hindustani speakers and Bengali people. Historically the term denoted Bishnupriya Manipuris and Bengalis, who are considered by Meiteis to be outsiders. The term later casually denoted 'foreigner' during the militancy in Manipur, which encompassed Indians from outside the state. Indians in general and Bengalis in particular became the targets of attacks. According to journalist Kishalay Bhattacharjee, the term is synonymous to Dkhar in Meghalaya.

== Usage ==
The term is used for people who are not from Manipuri and means foreigner in Manipuri dialect.

=== Kwak Mayang ===
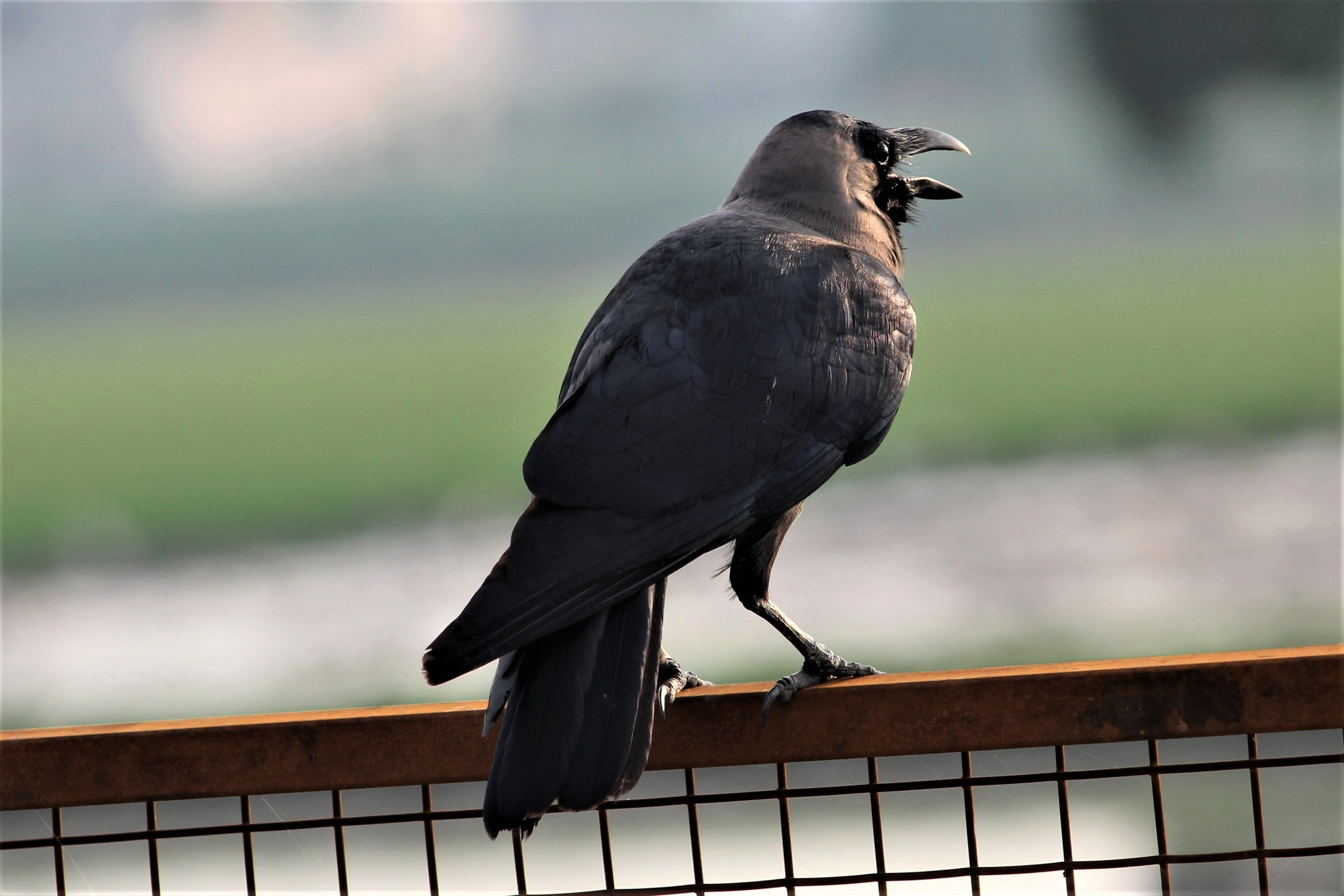
House crow near Chandigarh.

The Corvus splendens or Indian crow is known as Mayang Kwak in Meitei. The Meiteis maintain that the Indian crow is not native to Manipur. As it arrived from the west, it is known as Mayang Kwak, literally meaning 'foreign crow' or 'western crow'. Australian dancer Louise Lightfoot recorded in her memoir a popular game among the Meitei children called 'Kwak Mayang'.

=== Mayang Hallo ===
Militants raised the violent war cry, 'Mayang Hallo!', literally meaning 'Foreigners go back!' The influx of people from elsewhere in India was perceived to be a threat to the indigenous population.

== See also ==
- Dkhar
- Bongal
- Malaun
