= THPP =

THPP may refer to:

- Thiamine pyrophosphate
- Tripura Hill People's Party, Indian political party
