= Tripura Hill People's Party =

The Tripura Hill People's Party (THPP) is a Tripuri nationalist political party in the Tripura region of India.

== History ==
The THPP is led by Debabrata Koloi.

== See also ==
- Tripuri nationalism
- Tripura rebellion
