= Dhananjoy Reang =

Indian rebel leader in the 1980s and 1990s

Dhananjay Reang is a Tripuri (Bru) rebel leader of the organisations National Liberation Front of Tripura, and Tripura National Volunteers (TNV).

He initiated the formation of National Liberation Front of Tripura after the TNV surrendered in 1988 before the Government of India, after signing the TNV accord.

After a coup was organised to ousted him from NLFT in 1994, he survived with a few of his followers until he surrendered in 1997 by dismantling his organisation the Tripura Resurrection Army, before the Government of Tripura.
