= Bongal =

Bongal is a term used in Assam to refer to outsiders. Assam has been settled by colonial officials (amlahs) from Bengal pre-Independence and Hindu Bengali refugees in the post-Independence periods. The Muslims peasants from East Bengal settled in Assam are now referred to as Miya. The term lent the name to the Bongal Kheda movement of the 1950s and 1960s which sought to drive out non-Assamese competitors and to secure jobs for the natives.

== History ==
The term Bongal came into prominence in the Buranjis, where they were used to describe foreigners from the west of the Ahom kingdom. The term may have been derived from 'Bangala', the name of the Mughal province of Bengal. Initially the term might have stood for the people of Bengal, but later it is said to have stood for any foreigner. Because of its geographic location, the approach to the Ahom kingdom from mainland India was through Bengal. The British came to be known as Boga Bongal (white Bongal). Ahom general Lachit Borphukan is said to have referred to the Mughals as Bongals. Over years of political seclusion, 'Bongal' became a term of suspicion, reproach and contempt. When the British annexed Assam to its Indian territories, many Bengali Hindus arrived in Assam by taking up administrative jobs in the government. The Britishers and the Bengali Hindus alike were referred to as Bongals. After the independence of India, the amount of increasing refugees arriving from the region of East Bengal and newly formed East Pakistan escalated tension among the Assamese people and the tribes in the state. By May 1949 the number of total refugees reached two-and-half lakhs increasing up to 2,740,455.

Annual Arrival of Refugees in Assam in 1946–1951
Place of Origin	Year	Number
East Bengal	1946	8,593
East Bengal	1947	42,346
East Bengal	1948	41,740
East Bengal	1949	33,138
East Bengal	1950	1,44,512
East Bengal	1950 (Jan.&Feb.)	3,479
West Pakistan	-	647
	Total	2,74,455

The Assamese people viewed Bongal was someone who didn't belong Assam, an intruder whose presence threatened to marginalize them socially and politically. The Britishers were called Boga Bongal, literally meaning 'the white foreigner' and the Bengali Hindus were called 'Kola Bongal' literally meaning 'the black foreigner'. In the 19th century Assamese intellectual discourse, anyone other than the people of Assam or the Hill tribes were called Bongals. They were described to be foreigners, uncivilized and filthy. An 1872 Assamese play by Rudra Ram Bordoloi titled 'Bongal Bongalini' lampooned the social problems created by the outsiders i.e. the Bongals, especially who came during the British rule. The Assamese women who preferred to marry the Bongals, referred to as 'Bongalini's (feminine of Bongal), were described as promiscuous women and concubines of the Bongals.

After the Independence, the term continued to be used for the Bengali Hindus. However, it was not used for the Bengalis only. In a broader sense, it was used to refer to any group that was perceived to be an outsider. West Bengal was described as Bongal Desh, literally meaning 'the land of the Bongals' in Assamese.

== Bongal Kheda ==
In the colonial period, the British proclaimed Bengali as the official language of assam even though both Assamese and Bengali were very different in nature and most of the populace were not familiar or knew the language. This was resented by the Assamese population as they saw it as a threat to their language and culture, this also led to Bengali people working in assam as most of the teacher's who came to assam were unfamiliar with the native Assamese language leading to illiteracy in the Assamese community and resentment for the Bengali Hindu's residing in assam. The resentment grew even further as After the Independence of India, the Assamese political leadership promoted the concept of Assam for Assamese which soon led to the demand of Assamese to be the sole official language of the state. Soon as the growing middle class populus of assam were still not getting jobs having a suitable educational background in their own state a resentment for Bengali population of assam grew as they made up a huge chunk of Assamese job market as they were seen as more educated and had a better image in India than the Assamese people even though the Assamese populus was at par or even more capable than the Bengali population in their state. This grew resentment in the Assamese community and after many Instances of Bengali-assamese feuds this resentment soon led to the movement called 'Bongal Kheda', literally meaning 'drive away the outsiders(here referring to the Bengali populus)', which resulted in many protest, vandalisation of property and attack on the Bengali Hindus state-wide. The movement that started in the early 1960s started again in different years throughout the sixties into the seventies and eighties leading to the even wider Assam movement. In the seventies it spread to other tribal northeastern parts of assam with significant Bengali population with similar condition likes Meghalaya and Tripura mostly under Assamese influence.

== See also ==
- Malaun
- Dkhar

== Sources ==
- Baruah, Manjeet (2012). Frontier Cultures: A Social History of Assamese Literature. New Delhi and London: Routledge. ISBN 9780415500807.
- Chakravarti, K.C. (30 July 1960). "Bongal Kheda Again" (PDF). The Economic Weekly. Mumbai: Sameeksha Trust: 1193–95. ISSN 0012-9976.
