= All Tripura Tiger Force =

Tripuri nationalist militant group

- Flag of the All Tripura Tiger Force
- Leader: Ranjit Debbarma (POW)
- Dates active: 1990- 2024
- Headquarters: Bangladesh
- Active regions: Tripura, India
- Ideology: Ethnic nationalism
- Status: Disbanded
- Size: 200 - 300
- Wars: Insurgency in North-East India: Insurgency in Tripura

The All Tripura Tiger Force (ATTF) was a Tripuri nationalist militant group active in India's Tripura State. It was founded on 11 July 1990, by a group of former Tripura National Volunteer members under the leadership of Ranjit Debbarma. The ATTF is considered a terrorist organisation by India. According to the South Asian Terrorism Portal, approximately 90% of the ATTF's administration are Hindu and the rest are Christians. The group was said to have been formed as the armed wing of the National Liberation Front of Tripura (NLFT) but split into its own organization. The group was headquartered in Tarabon in Bangladesh.

== History ==
Initially known with the name All Tripura Tribal Force formed on 11 July 1990 but difference in the leadership idea of Lalit Debbarma and Ranjit Debbarma on the core issue of signing an memorandum of settlement with the Government of Tripura and to surrender its cadres lead to the formation of Tiger force .Lalit Debbarma (President), Ramendra Reang (Vice President), Dilip Debbarma (Treasurer), Rabindra Reang (General Secretary), Santaram Reang (Accountant) surrendered on 23 August 1993 along with 1633 cadres. But Ranjit Debbarma continued Armed insurgency along with his followers with the name "ALL TRIPURA TIGER FORCE".

The Tripura Land Revenue and Reforms Act of 1960 can be seen as a source of Tripuri grievances against Bengali peoples. This act stated that any person who came into Tripura would be considered as an illegal trespasser. The Tripuri people considered Bengalis trespassers in their land so they wanted this act to take full effect. Another grievance for the Tripuri people was that immigrants made up more of the population than the natives and they felt that their land was being taken over by Bengalis, who make up the majority of the population.

The organization began as a tribal group made up of extremists but eventually started recruiting tribal youth. This helped to grow the group and make it more powerful. By 1991, the group was a full-fledged terrorist organization.

This group was founded under the name "All Tripura Tribal Force". In 1992, the group changed the name from "All Tripura Tribal Force" to "All Tripura Tiger Force".

The group has various training camps spread throughout the Srimongal and Moulavibazar districts of Bangladesh. In 1993, a memorandum was issued by the ATTF. It expressed the idea that the members of All Tripura Tiger Force wished to stop their violent struggle against the Bengali people. The document also stated that there have been peace talks between the government of Tripura and the ATTF. Some members of the group decided to stay in the organization even with the memorandum, others left the group and renounced terrorism.

In 1997, the Indian government issued a ban under the Unlawful Activities Prevention Act against the ATTF due to the rioting caused by ethnic division in the Tripura region.

In 2004, there was a movement for peace with the Bengali peoples but it never came to pass. This was a move for peace led by Ranjit Debbarma that came with conditions. The primary condition was that Bengalis who entered Tripura after 1949 should be considered foreigners.

In October 2018, the Indian government denounced the All Tripura Tiger Force and The National Liberation Front of Tripura for its violent activities. The ATTF and NLFT were given the chance in 2019 to defend their recent actions when a team from the Indian Ministry of Home Affairs investigated both the organizations. They hoped to prevent the organization from being named as terrorist by the government of India.

In January 2019 The MHA tribunal recorded A fresh ban of five years was imposed on NLFT and ATTF, along with all their factions, wings and frontal organisations, on October 3 for their “violent and subversive activities”, which aim at the establishment of an independent nation by the secession of Tripura from India through armed struggle. In May 2019 the authorities continued for five more years the actual ban they have with the ATTF and the National Liberation Front of Tripura despite its partial demobilization

== Linkages ==
The Global Terrorism Database stated that the group had been operating under or with the United Liberation Front of Assam (ULFA). The group has been linked to other banned organizations such as the National Socialist Council of Nagaland-Khaplang (NSCN-K), the People's Liberation Army (PLA), the United National Liberation Front (UNLF), the People's Revolutionary Party of Kangleipak (PREPAK), the Revolutionary Peoples Front (RPF), and the National Liberation Front of Arunach Pradesh (NFLA). These groups were said to have been linked through extortion and drug-trafficking networks that cross the border between India and Bangladesh. The ATTF was caught in 2003 smuggling ammunition and explosives from Bangladesh to Nepal for Maoist insurgents. The Bangladesh RAB (Rapid Action Battalion) uncovered various All Tripura Tiger Force hideouts with large amounts of ammunition and explosives scattered along the Satchhari Forest, close to their headquarters in Tarabon.

== Operations ==
According to the Global Terrorism Database, the ATTF committed 7 claimed attacks and another 7 suspected attacks. The first claimed attack occurred in October 1992. The latest recorded attacks was committed in November 2017. The attack was an armed assault on police patrol which left four policemen dead. While all of their attacks have had relatively few casualties, their most lethal attack was in May 2003. The attack occurred in Mohorcherra, India against civilians and resulted in a total of 19 deaths.

== Leadership ==
As of 2016, the leadership of the group is as follows:

- President - Ranjit Debbarma
- Vice-president - Chitta Debbarma (also known as Bikash Koloi)
- Organization Secretary - Upendra Debbarma
- Publicity Secretary - Malinjoy Reang
- Communication Secretary - Subbodh Debbarma
- Finance Secretary - Asit Debbarma

Ranjit Debbarma was arrested in 2017 on sedition charges and was also thought to have been trying to form a new regime of terrorism in Tripura with the All Tripura Tiger Force and the National Liberation Front of Tripura. He was also arrested in Dhaka in 2012.

== Objectives ==
To rid all Bengali peoples from Tripuri areas, specifically those who entered after 1956

The returning of Tripuri lands to their original owners as provided under the act of 1960

To make the Tripura Merger Agreement of 1949 happen in the region.

- This agreement allowed Tripura to officially become a part of the Indian Union. Even though Bangladesh was still incorporated into India at this time, this would further separate the Tripuri peoples from their Bengali neighbors.

== Peace Accord ==
On 4 September 2024, the group's Chief Alindra Reang along with NLFT Chief Biswamohan Debbarma and vice chief Upendra Reang signed the 2024 Tripura Peace Accord with the Government of India, Government of Tripura ending the 35 year old Insurgency in Tripura.

== See also ==
- List of terrorist organisations in India
- Tripura rebellion
- Tripuri nationalism
