= Che in Paona Bazaar =

2013 book by Kishalay Bhattacharjee

- Tales of Exile and Belonging from India's North East
- Author: Kishalay Bhattacharjee
- Language: English
- Subject: Non-fiction
- Published: 10 January 2013, Pan Macmillan India
- Media type: paperback
- Pages: 241 pages
- ISBN: 9789382616047

Che in Paona Bazaar: Tales of Exile and Belonging from India's North East is a work of non-fiction authored by Bureau Chief journalist for North East India Kishalay Bhattacharjee (formerly associated with New Delhi Television NDTV). The book is an account of modern Northeast India focusing on Manipur, its culture, and its people. It is told through a fictional character who, according to the author, "embodies the angst, contradictions, and aspirations of many of her generation". The book contains anecdotes and untold stories Battacharjee encountered while working as a journalist.
