= Tripura National Volunteers =

- Leaders: Bijoy Kumar Hrangkhawl (President); Dhananjoy Reang (Vice President)
- Dates active: 1978 - 1988
- Ideology: Tripuri nationalism

The Tripura National Volunteers (also Tribal National Volunteers or Tripura National Volunteer Force) was a Tripuri nationalist militant group in the Tripura region of India that launched an armed struggle in the early 1980s to separate Tripura from India. TNV was led by Bijoy Kumar Hrangkhawl.

Christians made up a large percent of the fighters and leaders of the TNV. The chairman, Bijoy Hrangkhawl, was a devout Christian. Tribesmen who were not Christian who joined the TNV were encouraged to convert to Christianity.

TNV surrendered in 1988 and integrated themselves into a political party. However the few leadership of TNV did not take part in the Tripartite agreement in 1988 which lead to the outflow of NLFT in 1989 under the leadership of Dhananjoy Reang. In 2000, TNV renamed itself as Indigenous Nationalist Party of Twipra.

In 2001, TNV merged with Indigenous People's Front of Tripura.

== History ==
The TNV was founded in 1978 with assistance from the Mizo National Front. It was initially called the Tribal National Volunteers.

== See also ==
- Tripuri nationalism
- Tripura rebellion
- All Tripura Tiger Force
