= Dkhar =

Term

Dkhar is a term used by the Khasis to refer to non-Khasi people in Meghalaya. Though not the intention, it is generally perceived as derogatory by non-Khasi people. For Khasis any non-tribal is a dkhar and they address them by that term. Sometimes, the word has been collectively used with the term heathen (Non-believers), as most of the native Khasis are Christian, whilst non-tribals are mainly Hindu. In actuality, the term is mostly used for affluent Bengali Hindu settlers from British rule or the Bengali Hindu refugees from erstwhile East Pakistan It is sometimes abbreviated to ′Khar and may also denote a Khasi clan with the same name. Apparently this termis a colloquial slang and means basically refugee so non tribals have ill feeling sensed among themselves if spelt out by Khasis with hatred, people have suffered consequences by victims in the society of urban &rural Shillong.

== History ==
The 'Khasi-English Dictionary' published in 1906, lists Dkhar as meaning non-Khasi. The entry for its abbreviation 'khar, elaborates the non-Khasi aspect. Dkhar or 'khar could either refer to an inhabitant of the plains or a person from the Khasi clan having the same name. Dkhar was originally meant to designate a clan among the Khasis to assimilate people of having partial Khasi ancestry, but differentiated from the indigenous Khasi clans. However, in gradual usage the term came to represent non-Khasi people from the plains area surrounding the Khasi territory. During the British period, Bengalis of all religions, mainly Hindu from Kolkata, Dhaka and Sylhet settled in Shillong by acquiring government jobs and engaged in other white collar professions. They initially settled in Laban, then a small farming village and from then Laban became synonymous with dkhar. The Bengali Hindu settlers were perceived as outsiders, foreigners to the Khasi Hills and were negatively referred to as Dkhars. The Bengali Hindu festival of Durga Puja is called Pomblang U Dkhar in the Khasi language, literally meaning 'festival of the Dkhars'. After the Partition, many Bengali Hindus from East Bengal and Sylhet District, which was awarded to Pakistan, moved to Shillong. The Assam government settled the Bengali Hindu refugees in Them Rynjah (R.R Colony) and other neighbourhoods of Shillong. During this period Nepalis, Biharis, Marwaris, and Punjabis from various parts of Nepal and India settled in the present day territory of Meghalaya. The indigenous Khasi tribals began to hold the Dkhars responsible for their unemployment, poverty, and the loss of 'tribal lands'. The growing resentment was usually directed towards the Bengalis.

== Beh Dkhar ==
Bengali Hindu women and children in a refugee camp in Shillong in 1979

In 1979, as the anti-foreigner movement gained momentum in Assam, the ethnocentric Khasi organizations like the Khasi Students Union and the Hynniewtrep National Liberation Council raised the slogan of Beh Dkhar, literally meaning 'chase the Dkhars away', directed against the non tribals migrants of the state. Martin Narayan Majaw, leader of another ethnocentric Khasi group called Demands Implementation Committee stated, "We don't like outsiders to stay here. We tell them, come here, appreciate the blue sky and the green hills, and then go away."

== See also ==
- Bongal
- Mayang
- Malaun
