= 2019 Tripura Peace Accord =

Tripura Peace Accord is the tripartite accord signed-in on 10 August 2019 by the Government of India, Government of Tripura and the National Liberation Front of Tripura (NLFT) to end the insurgency.

The tripartite memorandum of understanding was signed by Satyendra Garg, Joint Secretary (Northeast) of Ministry of Home Affairs, Kumar Alok, Additional Chief Secretary (Home), Tripura and Sabir Kumar Debbarma and Kajal Debbarma of NLFT.
