= 2024 Tripura Peace Accord =

Indian agreement with insurgents

The 2024 Tripura Peace Accord was a peace agreement signed on 4 September 2024, between the Government of India, the Government of Tripura and the insurgent groups NLFT and ATTF, thus ending the 34 year old Insurgency in Tripura.

== Description ==
The Agreement was signed in the presence of the Home Minister of India Amit Shah, the Chief Minister of Tripura Manik Saha, and NLFT Chief Biswamohan Debbarma, its Vice president Upendra Reang and ATTF Chief Alindra Reang.

As a part of the agreement, the remaining cadres of both the NLFT and ATTF, about 328 militants, surrendered to the Government forces. The Government of India promised a ₹250 crore (roughly 30 million USD) financial package for the rehabilitation of the militants.

== See also ==
- Insurgency in Northeast India
