= Kishalay Bhattacharjee =

Indian senior journalist, Author And Director

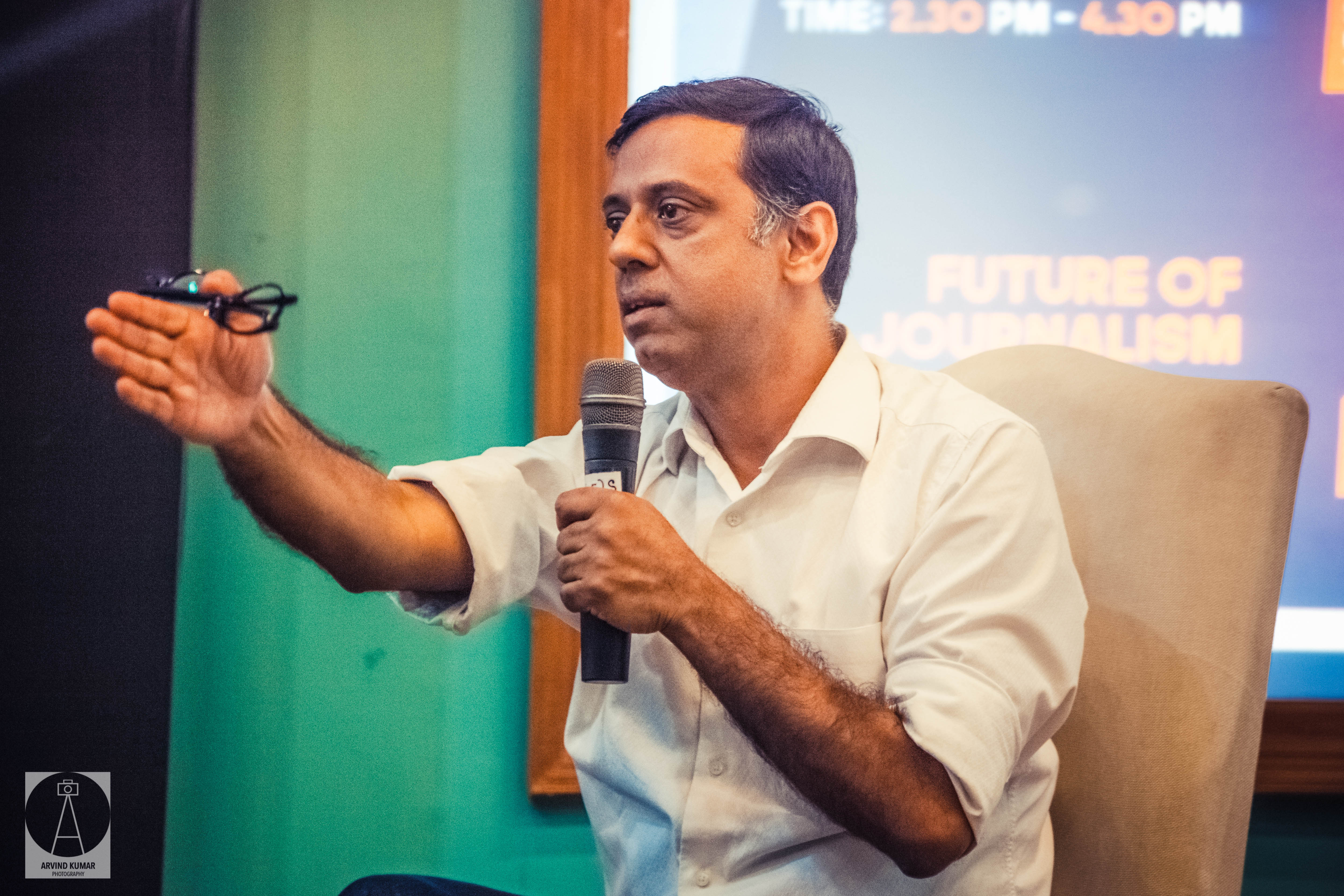
- Kishalay Bhattacharjee in 2018.
- Born: Guwahati, Assam, India
- Education: St Edmund's College, Shillong; North Eastern Hill University, Shillong
- Occupations: Author, journalist, academic, film maker
- Years active: 1991–present
- Website: reachoutfoundation.org.in

Kishalay Bhattacharjee (born 1969) is an Indian, senior journalist, columnist and author.

He has written three books: Che in Paona Bazaar, Blood on my Hands and An Unfinished Revolution.

He is currently working as a Professor and Dean of the Jindal School of Journalism and Communication, O.P. Jindal Global University.

He is the executive of director Reachout Foundation, Former resident editor NDTV, Chair internal security and senior fellow IDSA, Trainer, and documentary filmmaker. He is also a curator for a festival called ArtEast.

== Early life ==
Kishalay Bhattacharjee's mother Sobhona Bhattacharjee is a retired teacher and writer. Father Kamana Krishna Bhattacharjee, retired head of department, History, St. Edmund's College, Shillong and author of Making of North East India.

== Education ==
Mr. Bhattacharjee completed his schooling from the St. Edmund's School, Shillong and completed a bachelor's course in English from St. Edmund's College, Shillong. He then went to North Eastern Hill University, Shillong for M.Phil coursework.

== Career ==
Bhattacharjee worked for seventeen years at New Delhi Television (NDTV), as a Resident Editor. He reported on several conflicts during this time, including northeast India and Maoist corridor. He is currently a Professor and Dean, Jindal School of Journalism and Communication at the OP Jindal Global University. He is also the founder- director of the Reachout Foundation, which works to defy stereotypes, fight prejudice and eliminate discrimination.

== News reel ==
Kishalay Bhattacharjee is a Professor and Dean in the Jindal School of Journalism and Communication at OP Jindal Global University, Sonipat, Haryana. His books include Che in Paona Bazaar: Tales of Exile and Belonging from India's Northeast (Pan Macmillan India, 2013), Blood on My Hands: Confessions of Staged Encounters(Harper Collins India, 2015) and most recently An Unfinished Revolution: A Hostage Crisis, Adivasi Resistance and the Naxal Movement (Pan Macmillan India, 2017). He was the recipient of the first and only Penguin Random House Writer's Residency Award in 2016.

Besides covering conflict and post conflict stories, over the years Bhattacharjee has documented child soldiers in India, wildlife crime, narcotic trade, human trafficking and natural and man made disasters. His journalistic work on the Northeast of India is a resource that most media and academic organisations draw from.

== Awards and recognition ==
- Videocon Award for Television Excellence, 1994
- Best Journalist Award, Assam and Meghalaya, 2004
- Edward Murrow Fellow for Journalism, 2006
- Presented papers at Heildelberg University, Germany 2013, S. Rajaratnam School of International Studies, Singapore 2011, Jamia Millia Islamia 2011 and 2013 and University of Southern California, 2006.
- Ramnath Goenka Award for Excellence in Journalism, 2006 -2007
- Panos Fellowship for HIV/AIDS, 2007
- Nominated by Association of International Broadcasting AIB Awards, London for best current affairs programme in 2013
- Penguin Random House Writers Residency Award
- Moderated several roundtables in India and the US on media, strategic studies and writing
- He was Chair of Internal Security and a Senior Fellow at the Institute for Defence Studies and Analyses (IDSA) in 2011.

== Bibliography ==
- Che in Paona Bazaar, Kishalaya Bhattacharjee, (Pan Macmillan; 2013), ISBN 9781447247418, 1447247418.
- Blood on My Hands: Confessions of Staged Encounters, Kishalaya Bhattacharjee, (HarperCollins Publishers India; 2015), ISBN 9789351772590, 9351772594.
- An Unfinished Revolution: A Hostage Crisis, Adivasi Resistance and the Naxal Movement, Kishalay Bhattacharjee, (Pan Macmillan; 2017), ISBN 9781509885572, 1509885579.
