= Shanti Kali (Shanti Tripura) =

Indian Hindu priest and murder victim

Gurudev Santi Kali or Santi Tripura (died 27 August 2000) was a Hindu priest who was shot to death inside his ashram near Jirania under the Sadar subdivision in the Indian state of Tripura. Police reports regarding the incident identified ten members of the organization National Liberation Front of Tripura (NLFT) as being responsible for the murder.

== Background ==
Shanti Tripura, also commonly known as Shanti Kali, was a well-known Hindu saint working among the tribals in Tripura. His ashram was located near the Khumlwng area. He was born in a small village named Fulsori in south Tripura district of Subrum subdivision. He was the thirteenth child of Dhananjay Tripura and Khanjan Devi. He then left Tripura and ventured on a pilgrimage throughout India. It was during his travels that he determined to return to Tripura and establish a temple in the honor of Goddess Tripura Sundari and an ashram from which to administer to the needs of local tribals.

After completing his pilgrimage, he devoted his life to establishing the Shanti Kali Ashram, first consecrated in 1979 at Manu in Subrum, on the auspicious day of Shiv Chaturdashi. The ashram has now grown to include eighteen branches in Tripura. It has since been named the Shanti Kali Mission. The mission has been engaged in providing education to poor children, health services to the poor and running primary schools and orphanages.

== Death and subsequent events ==
On 27 August 2000, Shanti Kali was presiding at his ashram with a gathering of local devotees. At night, militants belonging to the separatist NLFT, broke into the ashram and murdered the priest for refusing to convert to Christianity along with his followers.

On 4 December 2000, nearly three months after his death, an ashram set up by Shanti Kali at Chachu Bazar near the Sidhai police station was raided by militants belonging to the NLFT. In the months following his death, eleven of the priest's ashrams, and orphanages around the state were closed down by the NLFT.
