= Reang =

Tripuri clan of Tripura state, India

Reang/Riang

Profile
- Country: India, Bangladesh and Myanmar
- Region: Tripura, Mizoram and Assam
- Ethnicity: Tripuri people

Chief
- none

Reang, also known as Bru, is one of the Tripuri clan of the Northeast Indian state. The Reangs can be found all over the Tripura state in India. However, they may also be found in Assam and Mizoram. Their language is similar to Kokborok and the language itself is the branch of Tibeto Burman, locally known as 'Kaubru'. They are known as "Riang" in the Indian Constitution. The Reang, on the other hand, identify as "Reang" rather than "Riang," and are often referred to as Bru. In the North East of India, the Brus call themselves as the Reangs, a semi-nomadic people who farm hillsides by the jhum or shifting method. This forces them to relocate after a few years.

Ethnically, the Bru are divided into three major clans: Meska and Molsoi and Uchoi/Ushoy. The Bru Community is made up of 14 clans or panjis: Molsoi, Tuimui, Msha, Taumayakcho, Apeto, Wairem, Meska, Raikchak, Chorkhi, Chongpreng, Nouhkham, Yakstam, Jolai and Waring.

According to Part XVII of the Constitution (Scheduled Tribes) Order, 1950, the Riang (Bru) tribe is a sub-tribe of the Kuki tribe and one of Mizoram's Scheduled Tribes. The Kukis and Mizos are members of the Kuki-Chin Linguistic Group, while the Brus belong to the Austroasiatic/ Mon–Khmer Linguistic Group. As a result, the Tripura Bru/Reang are designated as a distinct tribe under Section 16 of Part XV - Tripura of the Constitution (Scheduled Tribes) Order 1950.

In 2018, following the Union Home Ministry's decision to give voting rights to around 30,000 people who had fled from Mizoram to Tripura in 1997 in the wake of inter-community violence, The Election Commission asked the State of Mizoram to revise its rolls for the 2018 polls and include the members of the internally-displaced community. As many as 32,876 people of the Bru tribe were set to be repatriated to Mizoram after a tripartite agreement was signed between the centre, Tripura and Mizoram government. On 16 January 2020, a quadripartite agreement was signed among the centre, state governments of Tripura and Mizoram and Bru representatives to facilitate permanent settlement of Bru IDPs( Internally displaced people's) from Mizoram in Tripura, benefitting around 34,000 IDPs.

== The history of Bru (Reang) ==
The Bru are the second most populous tribe in Tripura after Tripuri people. According to the legend, a Tripuri prince who was once exiled by the King made his way, along with his followers, to the Mayani Thalang area of Lushai hills and founded a state over there. He proclaimed himself King and his descendants too ruled over the break-away state for generations. As it sometimes happens, there came a time when there was no heir to succeed to the throne, leading to anarchy in the kingdom. At around the same time, bitter feud and internal vendetta saw four chiefs of the following sub tribes Twikluha, Yongsika, Paisika, Tuibruha leave their hearth and home along with their entourages to migrate back to the state of Tripura. It was a long and arduous journey, fraught with danger and the travellers had to make more than a couple of attempts before they successfully made their way up the Dombur hill.

At the time, Mahendra Manikya ruled the kingdom of Tripura. The chiefs made many attempts to reach the King to request asylum. They approached ministers, bureaucrats, and courtiers for help in arranging a meeting with the King but with no success. By this time, they had exhausted their supplies and were rather anxious to catch the attention of the King. Finally in desperation, they breached the dam on the Gumti river where worshippers had gathered for prayers. This was a serious crime and all of them were immediately apprehended and brought before the king. The crime was a serious one and merited capital punishment. But before the King could pass his judgement, the chiefs managed to send word to the Queen Gunoboti. They begged her for help and she persuaded the King to forgive them. The chiefs swore fealty to the Queen and to the throne of Tripura and settled down in the Kingdom. Popular legend has it that the Queen even offered the chiefs breast milk, to symbolise their new parent-child relationship, in a large brass pan which was given to the chiefs along with other valuable things, carefully preserved by Reangs to date.

=== Historical population figures ===
In 1971 the Reang were the second largest of the scheduled tribes in Tripura. There were 64,722 people accounted for in the Reang tribe in Tripura that year. In 1961 the Reang had numbered 56,597 and in 1951 they had numbered 8,471. According to the 2001 census, there were 165,103 Reang in Tripura and 1,88,220 in 2011. In Mizoram the population of Bru is unknown but as per the research topic Insurgency in Mizoram: A study of its Origin, Growth and Dimensions (2008) in the year 1997 around 41000 Reang/Bru were forced to flee Mizoram but as of 2008 as per ‘Baptist Today’ there are 58269 populations of Bru in 80 villages of Mizoram. This population consists of 11350 families of Bru.

== Occupation, culture and custom ==
The Reangs are primarily an agrarian tribe. In the past, they mostly practised the Huk or Jhum cultivation like most other Tripuri tribes. However today, most of them have adopted modern agricultural practices. Many occupy high posts in the bureaucracy and a few have even started their own businesses.

=== Marriage system ===
The Reang are an endogamous tribal community. However, there was no strong objection of marrying someone outside of the community. Today inter-tribe marriages and inter-caste weddings have taken place among the Bru/Reang Tribal community. The marriage system is similar to other Tripuri tribes of Tripura. There is no dowry system, but the bridegroom has to spend a period of two years in the (future) father-in-law's house for before marriage is performed. The Tripuris' and the Riangs' systems of marriage are fairly comparable. The Riangs typically marry in one of two ways. They are.

(1) Moiseng: This is a bride price-based marriage system.

(2) Chamarui: This is a proba-tionary marriage system where the groom remains with the bride's family for a predetermined amount of time.

Marriages between close relatives are not frowned upon but are no longer as frequent. The majority of parents still wish to marry a member of their close family with their son or daughter. Marriage between children and the same father, however, has historically been viewed as improper. Cross-cousin marriage among the Reang is accidental. Child marriage is not allowed and widow remarriage is permitted. Recent widows are required to wait a whole year before wearing any ornaments and both widows, as well as widowers, are mandated twelve months of mourning during which they are forbidden from any form of entertainment. Remarriage is only allowed after a year of mourning. Bru society today is monogamous.

Marriage is arranged through the matchmaker Andra, who negotiates the bride price with the bride's parents. Marriage is settled to the satisfaction of both parties and performed by the Ochai. Marriage always takes place in the mid night. The marriage is celebrated simply but well in the Kausungmo, where pork, fowl, rice, rice beer are served. The marriage laws of the Reang are few but well defined. The marriage bond is very strong and men cannot divorce without the consent of their wives. If any Reang is accused of extramarital relationships and the accusations are proved true, a strict punishment and a heavy penalty is imposed on both parties.

Despite their patriarchal origins, the Chamerui marriage system, which many of the Riangs have adopted, is essentially a kind of matriarchal marriage. Divorce is very common, although the divorcee is free to get married again. After two divorces, a lady is never awarded a bride price in her third marriage. If a husband passes away, his widow is not permitted to wed again until her husband's bones have been properly disposed of. Additionally, a widower is prohibited from being married again before the ritualistic rite honoring his late wife is finished. Among the Reang community Monogamy has been considered as the best and only desirable form of Marriage.

=== Dress and ornaments ===
Like the other Tripuri, the traditional dress of the Reang is simple and plain. Men traditionally wear a hand woven loin cloth and a piece of cloth as a wrapper for the upper body. Along with this a piece of woven cloth is wrapped around the head by Kamsoih and is known as Kamsoih maitang. The women wear a long cloth called rnai, a wraparound; from the waist to down to the knees, a Risa covering the chest, and Rikatouh for covering the whole upper half of the body. The fabric is usually woven by the Reang women and very colourful. However modernisation has caught up with the Bru and most urban Reang no longer wear their traditional costumes.

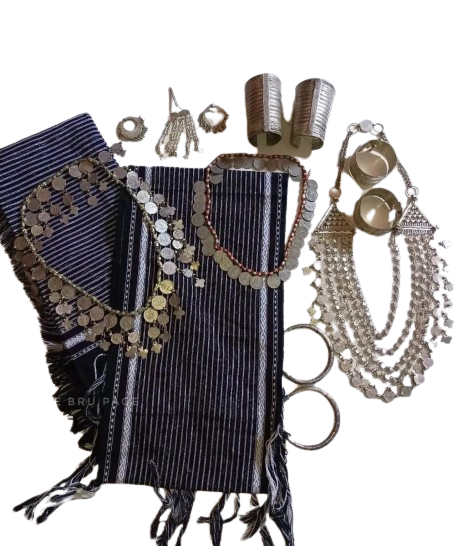
Dress and Ornament

The Reang women are very fond of personal adornment and, like other Tripuris, favour ornaments, flowers, and cosmetics. Silver ornaments, especially the necklace of silver coins, the Rangbauh have a pride of place and bestow high status. The other ornaments are Sanghai dunang, Nabak, Angkli, Taar, Tro, Chandraha, Beingi, etc.

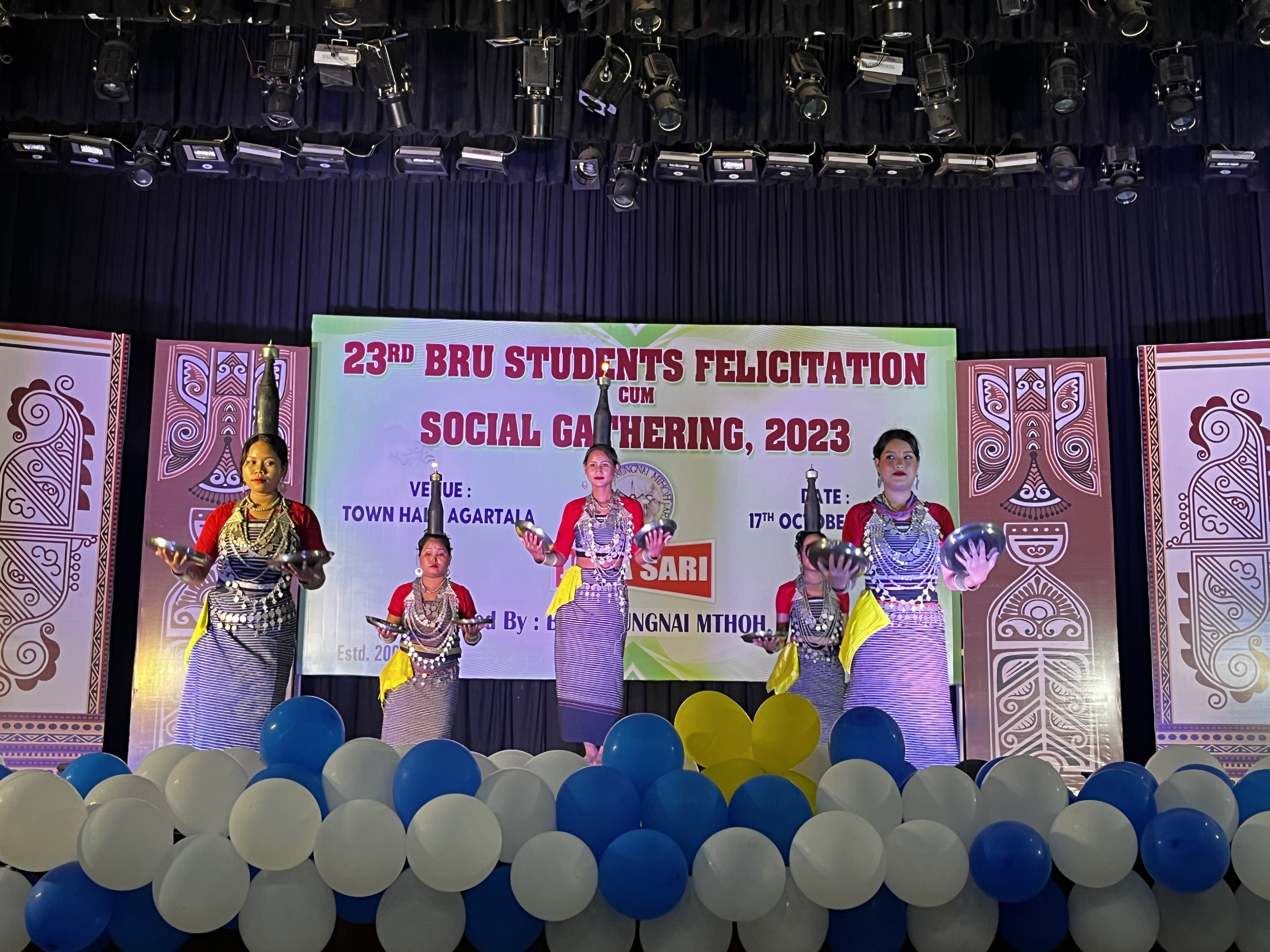
Hojagri Dance

=== Dance and music ===
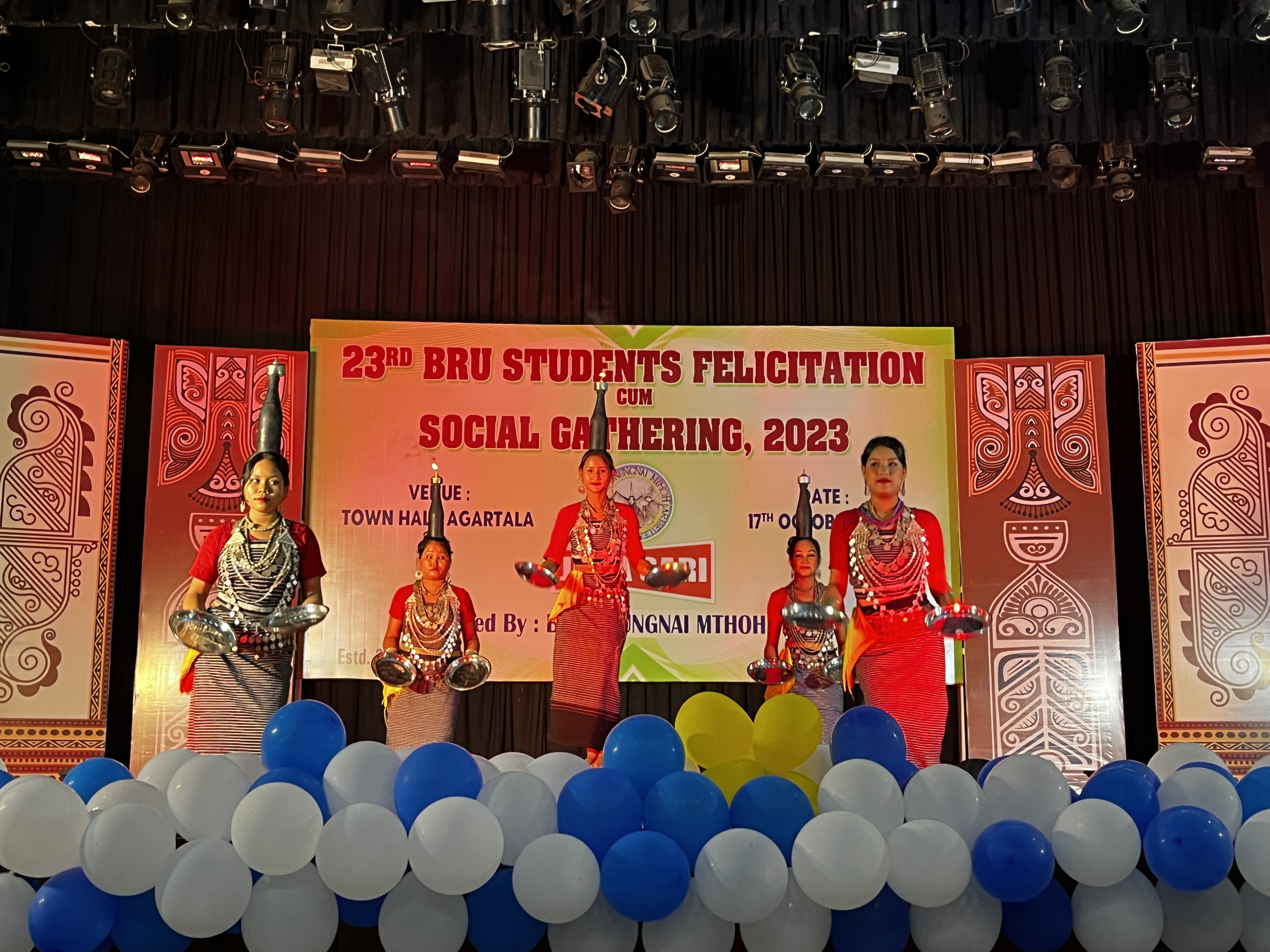
Hojagri Dance Perform by Reang Women

Dance is an integral part of Reang life. The Hojagiri folk dance of Reang tribe is rather well known all over the world. 'Buisu', not 'bihu' is the most popular festival of reang tribes, and Naisingpara Hojagiri Group is the most popular groups all among them. Late Maniram Reang is the founder of Naisingpara Hojagiri Dance Group. Hojagiri is more popular in Tripura than other states. Hojagiri dance is one of Tripura's most famous dances. The dance is done at the HOJAGIRI Festivals, also known as Laxmi Puja, which take place on the full moon night after Durga Puja. Generally after the third day of Dasherra. On this day, the Goddess Mailuma (Laxmi) is revered and adored with great devotion. The dance is done by solely women, who form teams of four to six. The Reangs performs this dance with great skill. The male members sing the lyrics and play the Kham (traditional drum), and Sumui (traditional flute). In addition, the women comprise the chorus team in the singing ensemble. The lyrics are basic, but the dance is unparalleled to the lyrics of Hojagiri dance. This dance requires substantial training and rehearsals. It's a sluggish hip and waist moving dance. The Hojagiri dance pattern takes around 30 minutes to complete. This dance demonstrates the entire Huk or Jhum growing process. To some extent, it resembles Hukni dance, although the pace and sequence are completely different. This dance is world-famous and has been included in several international folk culture programs.

Shi Satya Ram Riang is the Hojagiri dancer and trainer. He had dedicated his life to the development of Hojagiri dance, and he had built a school where he taught young people how to perform one of the Reang tribe's most famed and famous dance. Shi Riang received the Sangeet Natak Academy Award by the Government of India for his tireless efforts to conserve and promote the Hojagiri dance in India and internationally.

=== Customs ===
Most of the disputed and differences are settled by the people of Kotor dofa, that is by the Rai and Kaskau of respective sub tribe. It is done through the customary law of the Reangs. Whenever a disputes arise in the between the member of the community, a meeting is called by the Rai. All relevant arguments are heard and then justice is done according to the principle of natural justice. Whatever verdict or punishment is pronounced in the judgment it is implemented with firm hand and payments of penalty etc. are made then and there.

== Religious belief and practices ==
The majority (80%) of the Reang practice Vaishnavite Hinduism. This differs from Bengali Hindus in Tripura, who mostly follow Shaktism. 20% are Christians. The houses of Hindus are clearly numbered and marked with the symbol of a Trishul on the front wall to identify themselves as Hindus, though there is no segregation. The houses of Hindus and Christians are in mixed settlement and not segmented.

Like other Tripuri people, the Reang are polytheists and believe in multiple Gods and Goddesses. At the heart of the pantheon of divinities are the fourteen Gods and Goddess of Tripura. Their important festivals are the same those of prevailing in Tripura. These are, Buisi, Ker, Gonga Mtai, Goria, Chitragupra, Songrongma, Hojagiri, Katangi Puja, Lampra Uóhthoh. Laxmi puja is the very famous puja, which is celebrate on karthik poornima, Religious observances are community-based and every family in the clan or village must contribute their share of payment or tithe known locally as Khain.

All religious festivals are arranged during an annual meeting of chiefs. In such meetings political, social, and religious matters of importance are discussed and decided by the majority.

The deities of the Reangs are similar those of other Tripuri people. These are:

- Sibrai', the supreme deity or Mtai Ktor
- Tuima, the presiding deity of river
- Mainouhma, the goddess of paddy
- Khuluhma, the goddess of cotton
- Goroia, the god of wealth prosperity, well-being, and war
- Kalaia, brother of Goria
- Sangrongma, Mother Earth
- Hathaikchuma, the goddess of the hills
- Buraha, the god of the jungle
- Thuhnairou, the god of death
- Bonirou, the god of evil spirits
- Nouhsuma, the goddess of households

=== Worshipping of the deities ===
The rituals of worship are similar to the mainstream Tripuri. An Aokchai or priest performs all ceremonies aided by an assistant. A green bamboo pole is used to represent the deity. Different types of life stock such as fowl, pig, goat eggs, etc. are offered as sacrifice during worship. The place of worship is usually located at a distance from the main village. Offerings are dedicated in the names of the deities before the Wathop or green bamboo pole which represents the divine. However the Rangtouk and Nouhsuma pujas are held indoors inside the house only. Two earthen pots are filled with newly grown rice and at top of the pot some oval pebbles especially collected from huk are placed. The pebbles are called "Fortune stones". The pots (Rongtouh) are decorated with the rice powder, vermilion, and garlands. Typically, one is named Mainouhgma while the other is called Khuluhgma.

=== Rituals on birth of a baby ===
The birth of a baby is accompanied by many rituals. Several pujas like Kebengbuhmo, Aabuh sumo, Khongkhoknok kamo, bachak kamo, Mai tuma etc. are conducted for the welfare of the newborn. Fowl, prawns, and several leaves of trees are needed for these rituals. As the child grows up, a special form of worship has to be performed. Bukhuksni the seven-guardian deities of witches are propriated with the sacrifice of a pig, four fowls, and other living beings.

=== Ceremony on death ===
The Reang use cremation to dispose of the mortal remains of the dead. Obsequies are performed in three stages: maibaumi, Broksakami and Kthuinaimo.

==== Brouhsaomo ====
The corpse is first bathed with the Chobtui or "alkali water/soap", and Mairungtwi that is "water obtained from the washing of raw rice". After that it is dressed with new clean Rikatouh, the head is dressed with another piece of rikatouh and wrapped just like headgear. In case of a female corpse, the rnai and rsa are used. A fowl is then sacrificed at the feet of the corpse. Later, an earthen pot filled with fish and rice placed at the feat of the deceased and it is followed by dance rituals through the night. Rice beer is distributed to all mourners except the family members of the deceased. The next morning the body is placed on a pyre and cremated.

==== Kthoinaimo ====
Laotou or the deceased soul remains under the control of the Sisi Manji the son of Buraha, for a year and it is said that Sisi Manji is the protector of the soul. On the day of the Kathainaimi, the widow offers dried rice, meat, fish, fruits, and wine in the name of Laotau and Sisi Manji on the smangnouh and then takes the burnt bones or ashes to the charainouh. It is worshiped for over a period of one year or until the next hangrai, when it is immersed in any river or in Gomati River at Dumbur. In short the religious culture of the Reang is similar to that of other Tripuri of Tripura.

== The Displaced Reangs ==
Since 1997, tens of thousands of Reangs are living as refugees in Tripura and Assam. However, the number has declined (from 50,000 plus to 28,686 as of 2017) as a result of voluntary repatriation to Mizoram, extremely low birth rates (only 6,685 of the 28,686 refugees are below 18 years of age) and high death rates. The Tripura government has acknowledged that among the refugees the number of deaths is more than the number of births (during 1997–00, there were a total of 1,595 births and 1,670 deaths). According to the Bru Refugee Committee, in 1997 a total of 35,822 individuals were living as refugees (out of them 6,166 being minors).

Voting rights for Reang refugees are under threat, as the Mizo NGOs have constantly opposed their participation in the election process. Out of the 40 assembly constituencies, Reangs are a majority in two (50% in Mamit, 68% in Hachhek, 27% in Thorang).

== Death in displaced camps ==
Displaced Brus from Mizoram have claimed that four members of the community, including a four-month-old infant, had died of starvation at the refugee camps in Tripura. Mizorum Bru Displanced People's Forum (MBDPF) said four had died because the refugees were running out of food. Hunger has forced them to resort to a road blockade, the forum added.
