= Biswamohan Debbarma =

- Born: 1968 (age 57–58)
- Military career
- Allegiance: National Liberation Front of Tripura
- Rank: Chairman

Biswamohan Debbarma declared himself as a chairman of the National Liberation Front of Tripura of his own faction. In May 2017 in a meeting at an undisclosed location, selected Subir Debbarma alias Yamorok (45), as the new 'president' of the organization hence renamed NLFT SD which later signed a Memo of Settlement with Govt. of India on 10 August 2019. He was wanted by India and Interpol for crimes against life and health, and crimes involving the use of weapons/explosives, but was captured by Security forces in a hideout in Bangladesh.

On 4 September 2024, he signed the 2024 Tripura Peace Accord along with ATTF and the Government of India ending the 35 year old Insurgency in Tripura.
