= Tripuri nationalism =

Ideology asserting that the Tripuri are a distinct nation

Tripuri nationalism is an ideology that supports self-determination by the Tripuri people. The conflict is in essence ethnic and the Tripuri community, indigenous to the region formed the clear majority of population in the princely state of Tippera, which joined the Republic of India in 1949 as the state of Tripura.

The issue has led to a number of armed uprisings and Insurgency in Tripura. There was a rebellion in 1950, and armed conflict continued to erupt in the 1980s to 2000s. Since 1989, the armed rebellion was mostly led by the National Liberation Front of Tripura (NLFT) and the All Tripura Tiger Force ATTF). The Bengali side retaliated by forming militias of their own, such as the United Bengali Liberation Tiger Front (UBLTF), which destroyed a number of Tripuri villages in 2000.

The NLFT is classified by the National Memorial Institute for the Prevention of Terrorism as one of the ten most active terrorist groups in the world, and has been accused of forcefully converting people to Christianity.

Militant activity peaked in 2000 with 514 terrorism-related fatalities in that year. As of 2012, the uprising has largely been brought under control by the authorities through security actions and negotiated surrenders.

== Organisations and militant groups ==
Tripuri political organizations and militant groups include:

- All Tripura Tiger Force
- National Liberation Front of Tripura

== See also ==
- Tripura Tribal Areas Autonomous District Council
- Tripura rebellion
- Naga nationalism
- Tamil nationalism
- Insurgency in North-East India
- Assamese nationalism
- Assam movement
- United Liberation Front of Axom
- Assam conflict
