= National Liberation Front of Tripura =

Tripuri Militant organization

- Flag of the National Liberation Front of Tripura
- Founding leader: Dhananjoy Reang
- Leaders: Biswamohan Debbarma (POW); Utpanna Tripura †; Mukul Debbarma †; Nayanbashi Jamatia (POW)
- Dates active: 1989 – 2024 (35 years)
- Split to: National Liberation Front of Tripura - Biswamohan (NLFT-BM) (Until 2024); National Liberation Front of Tripura - Parimal Debbarma (NLFT-PD) (Until 2024); National Liberation Front of Tripura - Nayanbasi(NLFT-N) (Until 2004); National Liberation Front of Tripura - Prabhat Jamatya(NLFT-PJ) (Until 2014); National Liberation Front of Tripura-Subir (NLFT-SD) (Until 2019)
- Active regions: Tripura, India
- Ideology: Tripuri nationalism Separatism; Sovereigntism; Ethnonationalism; Anti-Bengali sentiment
- Status: Disbanded
- Size: 550 (Biswamohan faction); 250 (Nayanbasi faction)
- Wars: Insurgency in Northeast India: Insurgency in Tripura

The National Liberation Front of Tripura (abbreviated NLFT) was a Tripuri nationalist militant organisation based in Tripura, India. It had an estimated 1500 members in 2001. The NLFT sought to secede from India and establish an independent Tripuri state and was an active participant in the insurgency in Northeast India. The NLFT is currently designated as a terrorist organization in India.

== History ==
With the increased immigration of Bengalis from the Bangladesh and West Bengal to Tripura, in the aftermath of one of the worst ethnic riots, the NLFT was created in 1989. Since then, the NLFT has been advancing its cause through armed rebellion. In its constitution, the organization claims to represent the indigenous Tripuri population which it claims has been marginalized by "the subjugation policy of imperialist Hindustani (India)"; its constitution makes no mention of any specific religion and claims to extend membership to "any person irrespective of caste, sex or creed". Many leaders of the group were Animists and Hindus.

The NLFT is listed as a terrorist organization in the Prevention of Terrorism Act, 2002. The state government contends that the Baptists of Tripura supply arms and give financial support to the NLFT. In April 2000, according to the state government, the secretary of the Noapara Freedom Front in Tripura, Nagmanlal Halam, was arrested with explosives and confessed that for two years he had been buying explosives for the NLFT. In 2000, the NLFT threatened to kill people celebrating the Bengali festival of Durga Puja. A Ram Pada Jamatia, a BJP politician, claims the group forcefully converted tribal villagers to Christianity which he said was a serious threat to peace.

In accordance with its stated goal of turning Tripura into the "land of Tripura free of Bengalis", the NLFT has told tribal communities to do act cleansing Tripura from Bengalis. This has caused the Bengali, Jamatia tribesmen and the predominantly animist Reangs to oppose the NLFT.

On 7 August 1998, 4 senior leaders of the right-wing Rashtriya Swayamsevak Sangh (RSS) were kidnapped by the NLFT, and all 4 of them are now said to be dead.

In early 2000, 16 Bengalis were killed by the NLFT at Gourangatilla. On 20 May 2000, the NLFT killed 25 Bengalis at the Bagber refugee camp. In August 2000, a tribal Hindu spiritual leader, Shanti Kali, was shot dead by about ten NLFT guerrillas.

In December 2000, Labh Kumar Jamatia, a religious leader of the state's second largest Hindu group, was kidnapped by the NLFT, and found dead in a forest in Dalak village in southern Tripura. According to police, rebels from the NLFT wanted Jamatia to convert to Christianity, but he refused. A local Marxist tribal leader, Kishore Debbarma, was clubbed to death in Tripura's Sadar by militants from the Biswamohan faction of the NLFT in May 2005.

In 2001, there were 826 reported terrorist attacks in Tripura, in which 405 people lost their lives and 481 kidnappings were made by the NLFT and related organizations such as the All Tripura Tiger Force (ATTP). Nagmanlal Halam, secretary of the Noapara Baptist Church in Tripura, was arrested for and confessed, under torture from police, to providing munitions and financial aid to the NLFT from 1998 until 2000.

The BBC reported in 2005 that independent investigations as well as confessions from surrendered members showed that the NLFT had been making and selling pornography to finance their activities. This includes DVDs of pornographic films made by the group with tribal men and women kidnapped and forced to participate in sex acts while being filmed. The movies are dubbed into various languages and sold illegally throughout the region for a profit. Statements from former members and one report state that the NLFT has a history of sexually abusing tribal women.

== Factions ==
The NLFT was originally started by Dhananjoy Reang, then vice chief Tripura National Volunteers On 12 March 1989 after disagreement with the tripartite agreement signed between TNV, Government of India and Government of Tripura. He sought the formation of armed wing of NLFT named NATIONAL HOLY ARMY in 1991 after launching "Operation Genesis" at Tainani Police station which led to the new phase of Tripuri nationalism which lasted more than 30 years. Reang was removed from his position of president in a coup by his counterparts due to internal conflict in 1993. Cited causes of internal conflicts include the reluctance of Biswamohan Debbarma's Central Executive Committee to nominate Joshua Debbarma (alias Jogendra) as the King of 'Tripura Kingdom'; misappropriation of funds by senior leaders and lavish lifestyles led by the senior leadership..

=== Biswamohan faction ===
The Biswamohan faction (NLFT/BM) is earlier headed by Biswamohan Debbarma. In May 2017 In a meeting at an undisclosed location, selected Subir Debbarma alias Yamorok (45), as the new 'president' of the organization renaming it as the NLFT SD. It later signed a memorandum of Settlement with Government of India to abide by The Constitution of India & join the mainstream on 10 August 2019.

Upon the surrender of Mantu Koloi, second in command, he requested that Biswamohan Debbarma and Ranjit Debbarma engage in talks with the Government of India to resolve the crisis. This was sparked by the Bangladeshi government's crackdown on hostile groups. The government there were able to do this by extensively searching the Sacherri jungles where the organization had many of its hideouts. However, both leaders vowed to fight on. This group signed peace pact with Government of India ending decade long insurgency in the presence of president Biswamohan Debbarma and vice president Upendra Reang alias Twijwlang@zerifa as the dignitaries of NLFT(BM) at 4 September 2024 in NEW DELHI.

=== Nayanbasi faction ===
The Nayanbasi faction has approximately 50 sophisticated weapons, 50 persons in collaboration with the group, and 150 cadres in active duty. In January 2004, the Nayanbasi faction group sent a message to the Additional Director of General Police (ADG) with the intention to start peace talks. These meetings ultimately were not successful. Later that year it peacefully entered into a Memorandum of Settlement with India.

== Location ==
The group has been banned from the Indian government since the Unlawful Activities Act of 1967. Therefore, the group operates from its headquarters in Khagrachari, a district in Bangladesh around 45 km from Simanapur. The National Liberation Front of Tripura has the ability to utilize this 856 km of the border that is unfenced and susceptible to invasion.

== Attacks ==
The National Liberation Front of Tripura had conducted 81 attacks on various locations in South Asia and specifically in Tripura. Of these 81 attacks, handguns and firearms have been the most common weapon. Between 1992–2001, a total of 764 civilians and 184 security forces personnel were killed in NLFT attacks, 124 members of the organization were killed in these attacks. Later, during the period 2005–2015, NLFT has been responsible for 317 incidents in which 28 security forces and 62 civilians lost their lives.

== Objectives/Ideologies ==
A common ideology within the NLFT was Tripuri Nationalism. This has two components: a Tripura state that is for only the native citizens, and the Bengalis that inhabit Tripura have no political rights or power. Among the leadership and followers of the NLFT, there are a few common objectives that come to the surface when doing analysis on this group.

1. To liberate Tripura from the union of India
2. To deport all Indians and Bangladeshis who entered into Tripura after 1947.
3. To restore alienated tribal lands

== Peace Accord ==
Tripura Peace Accord is the tripartite accord signed-in on 10 August 2019 by the Government of India, Government of Tripura and the National Liberation Front of Tripura (NLFT) to end the insurgency. The tripartite memorandum of understanding was signed by Satyendra Garg, Joint Secretary (Northeast) of Ministry of Home Affairs, Kumar Alok, Additional Chief Secretary (Home), Tripura and Sabir Kumar Debbarma and Kajal Debbarma of NLFT.

On 4 September 2024, the remaining faction of NLFT along with ATTF signed the 2024 Tripura Peace Accord with Government of India, Government of Tripura ending the 35 year old Insurgency in Tripura.

== Flag ==
The NLFT has its own flag which consists of three colors: green, white, and red. The green portion of the flag symbolizes sovereignty over Tripura, the land to which they lay claim. The white portion of the flag signifies the peace they desire to. The color red represents the revolution and the blood that has been shed in the name of their revolution. The final part of the flag is the star which acts as the guiding light for the Borok during this struggle.

== See also ==
- Insurgency in Northeast India
- Separatist movements of India
- Insurgent groups in Northeast India
- Indigenous Nationalist Party of Tripura
