= Ranjit Debbarma =

Tiprasa politician

- Mwsa
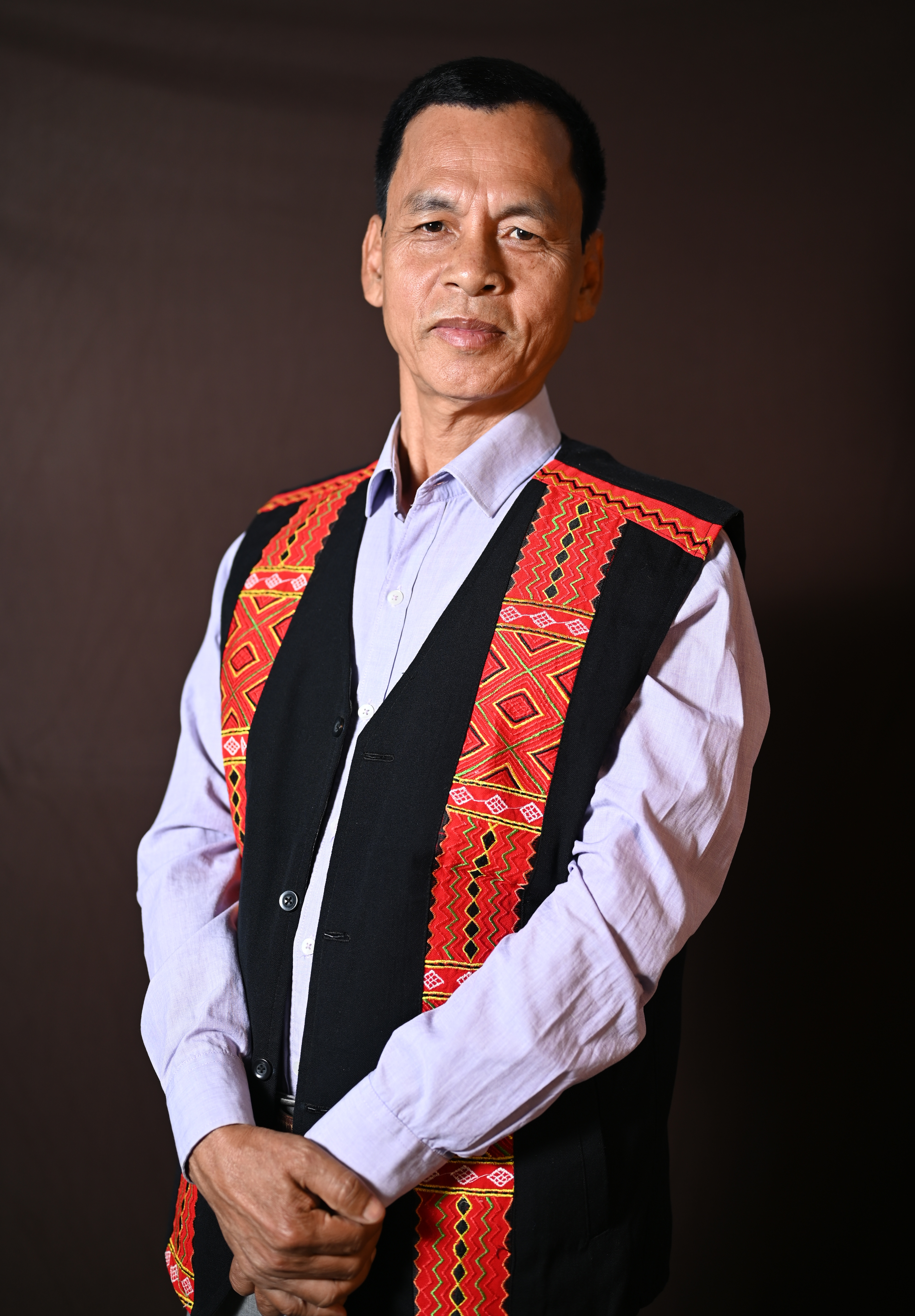
- Ranjit Debbarma in 2023

Member of the Tripura Legislative Assembly
- Incumbent
- Assumed office 2023
- Preceded by: Prasanta Debbarma
- Constituency: Ramchandraghat

Personal details
- Born: 1964 (age 61–62) Yacharai, West Tripura, India
- Party: Tipra Motha Party
- Spouse: Kajal Rani Debbarma
- Children: 1
- Committees: Chairman, Assurance Committee, Tripura Legislative Assembly (2024–present)

Ranjit Debbarma is an Indian politician who is a Member of the Tripura Legislative Assembly from the Ramchandraghat constituency.

== Political career ==
Ranjit Debbarma became one of the early member of the Tipraha Indigenous Progressive Regional Alliance (TIPRA) when it was formed in 2019.

Debbarma has been highly vocal on the issue of illegal immigration from Bangladesh in Tripura. He continues to write letters to the Indian home minister, Tripura chief minister and authorities to take stern action to push back illegal immigration in Tripura.

== Tripuri Nationalism Movement ==
Upon the surrender of Mantu Koloi, second in command of one of the factions of the All Tripura Tiger Force, he requested that Ranjit Debbarma engage in talks with the Government of India to resolve the crisis, but Debbarma vowed to fight on.
