= Malaun =

Pejorative term for Bengali Hindus

Malaun (Bengali: মালাউন) is a Bengali pejorative, derived from the Arabic term "ملعون" (mal'un), meaning "accursed" or "deprived of Allah's Mercy", directed at Bengali Hindus and Indians by the Bangladeshis and the Bengali Muslims.

== Etymology ==
The Arabic word "ملعون" (mal'un), literally meaning 'cursed' is derived from the root "لعنة" (la'nat) meaning "curse". In Islamic parlance, it means 'deprived of Allah's mercy'. The word has been loaned into languages of non-Arabic Islamic countries like Malay and Indonesian. The dictionary published by the Bangla Academy gives the meaning of the Bengali word "মালাউন" as someone cursed or deprived of Allah's mercy or forcefully evicted or a Kafir. It mentions that the word is used as a slur by the Muslims against the non-Muslims.

== Usage ==
Nirmal Kumar Bose noted the usage of the term as early as 1946 in Noakhali.

During the 1971 Bangladesh Genocide, the Pakistani officers addressed Dr. Govinda Chandra Dev as malaun before executing him. According to eyewitnesses, AKM Yusuf had addressed a gathering of Peace Committee at Rampal in Khulna district on 19 April. At the gathering he addressed the Hindus as malauns and the Hindu women as spoils of war and exhorted the audience to kill them and loot their women. The term was also used after independence by the pro Mujibist Jatiya Rakkhi Bahini militia in rural areas.

Hussain Muhammad Ershad, while serving as the President, had referred to the Hindus as malaun at a rally in Chhatak. He apologized for his remark after protests from the Hindus.

In December 2013, Ganajagaran Mancha presented a deputation to the Home Ministry complaining about police torture. The deputation alleged that on 19 December 2013 the police abused a Hindu woman activist as malaun because she had put sindur. In December 2014, Nasiruddin Pintu, a convicted BNP politician, abused a Bengali Hindu police officer by calling him a malaun when he attempted to stop his lawyers and supporters from meeting Pintu illegally. Pintu threatened the officer with loss of job and called him son of a pig. In January 2015, Awami League workers Shahnawaz abused fellow Awami League worker Sushanta Dasgupta at a party function in London.

== See also ==
- Keling
- Pajeet
- Paki
- Anti-India sentiment
- Anti-Hindu sentiment
- Gentoo
- Kafir
