= Shivkar Bapuji Talpade =

Indian aviation enthusiast

Shivkar Bāpuji Talpade was an Indian instructor with an interest in Sanskrit and aviation. He lived in Mumbai, and is claimed to have constructed and flown an unmanned, heavier-than-air aircraft in 1895. Contemporary accounts of a successful flight do not exist, and no reliable historical records document its existence. Pseudo-historical narratives about Talpade proliferated in India in the early 2000s among adherents of the Hindu-nationalist right-wing. These included the false claim that Talpade had "invented the modern aircraft".

== Talpade's aircraft ==
Talpade is claimed to have constructed an unmanned, heavier-than-air aircraft, named Marutsakhā ("friend of the air"), and flown it above Bombay's Chowpatty Beach in 1895. Contemporary accounts of a successful flight do not exist, and no reliable historical records document its existence.

Talpade's aircraft was reputed to have flown to a height of 1,500 feet (460 m). Pratap Velkar, a local architect who has researched Talpade's life and written a book about him, denies this, stating that it rose to a small height before crashing. The aircraft has been described as a cylinder of bamboo, with claims it used mercury or urine as a fuel. Some of Talpade's drawings were said to have been sent to Hindustan Aeronautics (HAL), but Anuradha Reddy, a historian of aviation, was unable to trace them. The aircraft itself has been described as being sold to Rallis Brothers, or to HAL. Some accounts of the event stated that the flight was watched by Sayajirao Gaekwad III, then the Maharaja of Baroda, but direct evidence for this is scant. Velkar states that no royals attended, as it was not well-publicized.

Some versions of the story say that Talpade had advice from Subbaraya Shastry (1866 - 1940), who later wrote Vaimānika Shāstra ("Science of Aeronautics"), a text that is frequently associated with descriptions of aircraft in the Vedas. Shastry claimed the text was delivered to him psychically and was thousands of years old. A 1974 paper by scientists from the Indian Institute of Science declared that the designs in the Vaimānika Shāstra itself were technologically unfeasible, stating that the text showed a "complete lack of understanding of the dynamics of the flight of heavier-than-air craft". The study also stated that elements of the text were "entirely modern", and that it was definitively not vedic in origin. Shastry himself in his autobiography states that Talpade attempted to construct models of aircraft under Shastry's guidance but was unsuccessful in making any of them fly.

== Cultural legacy ==
Narratives about the event proliferated in the early 2000s among adherents of the nationalist right-wing. The absence of evidence of its construction is attributed to censorship by the British Raj. Talpade developed a reputation as the "first man to fly an aircraft", given that his achievement was supposed to have taken place eight years before the Wright Brothers flew their plane in 1903. The aircraft attributed to Talpade was unmanned: unmanned aircraft were already in existence at that time, and were flown successfully decades before Talpade's birth. The first such flight was by English engineer John Stringfellow, whose craft flew about thirty yards in 1848.

A film based on life of Talpade, Hawaizaada, starring Ayushmann Khurrana, was released on 30 January 2015. The government of Uttar Pradesh exempt the film from taxes in that state. The film states that Talpade had accomplished in 1895 what the Wright Brothers did in 1903. The Hindi News channel Zee News aired a piece titled "Wright brothers wrong thhe" (the Wright brothers were wrong). The segment claimed that Talpade's craft was the first modern aircraft in the world, and that it was the first drone. Also in 2015, a controversial paper presented at the Indian Science Congress claimed that Talpade had "invented the modern aircraft". Ram Prasad Gandhiraman, a scientist working for NASA, described the paper as pseudoscience.

== See also ==
- Claims to the first powered flight
