= Hawaizaada =

- Theatrical release poster
- Directed by: Vibhu Puri
- Screenplay by: Vibhu Puri; Saurabh Bhave
- Produced by: Reliance Entertainment; Vibhu Puri
- Starring: Ayushmann Khurrana; Mithun Chakraborty; Pallavi Sharda
- Cinematography: Savita Singh
- Edited by: Shan Mohammed
- Music by: Score: Monty Sharma; Songs: Rochak Kohli; Mangesh Dhakde; Vishal Bhardwaj; Ayushman Khurrana
- Production companies: Trilogic Media; Film Farmers
- Distributed by: Reliance Entertainment
- Release date: 30 January 2015
- Running time: 157 minutes
- Country: India
- Language: Hindi
- Budget: ₹250 million

Hawaizaada (transl. 'Airborne') is a 2015 Indian Hindi drama film written, directed and produced by Vibhu Puri along with Reliance Entertainment. Inspired by the biography of Shivkar Bapuji Talpade, the film stars Ayushmann Khurrana, Mithun Chakraborty and Pallavi Sharda. Talpade, a resident of Bombay, is claimed to have constructed and flown an unmanned, heavier-than-air aircraft in 1895. Contemporary accounts of a successful flight do not exist, and no reliable historical records document its existence. The film depicts Talpade successfully conducting a manned flight. It was released on 30 January 2015. The film was declared tax-free in Uttar Pradesh.

== Plot ==
During the era of the British Raj, a happy-go-lucky school drop-out named Shivkar Bapuji Talpade (Ayushmann Khurrana), a.k.a. Shivi, falls in love with a local stage dancer named Sitara (Pallavi Sharda). This makes Shivi's father throw him out of the house. Shivi bumps into a crazy scientist, Pandit Subbaraya Shastri (Mithun Chakraborty). Shastri is constantly being chased by British soldiers for his weird experiments, but unbeknownst to them, Shastri is secretly building a flying machine. Seeing Shivi's great knowledge of the Vedas, Shastri shares with Shivi a secret book of ancient Indian aeronautics, which he is using to build an aeroplane. Shastri offers to let Shivi be his assistant, but Shivi refuses. Shivi later proposes to Sitara, but Sitara resists on the grounds that society will not accept their marriage. She goes away to Hyderabad.

Heartbroken, Shivi goes back to Shastri and accepts his offer to assist him. Together they work for several months on the flying machine, but they fail again and again. On running out of funds, they ask a local king to sponsor their experiments. Finally, they manage to build a small aeroplane and have a successful unmanned test flight in the presence of eyewitnesses — but it crashes within a few seconds. Shivi later learns that Sitara is back in Bombay, living in poverty and debt. In order to get Sitara out of debt, Shivi sells Shastri's secret book to a British officer. Feeling betrayed, Shastri does not survive this trauma and dies. Shastri's death makes Shivi feel so guilty that he (along with Sitara and Shivi's nephew Narayan) decides to fulfill Shastri's dream.

In his quest to build a perfect flying machine, Shivi goes to Banaras to meet a guru, to whom Shastri used to refer. The guru gives Shivi a code, "4121", which helps Shivi figure out that mercury will be the best fuel for his engine, since in Hindi the word for "mercury" (पारा) looks like the number 4121. Before Shivi can complete his machine, British officers arrest him on a complaint made by his brother. After being rescued by a freedom fighter, Shivi finally takes the aircraft to the beach. Before the soldiers can arrest him, Shivi flies away with Sitara, thus becoming the first people to ride in a flying machine.

== Cast ==
- Ayushmann Khurrana as Shivkar Bapuji Talpade
- Pallavi Sharda as Sitara
- Mithun Chakraborty as Pandit Subbaraya Shastri
- Naman Jain as Narayan
- Jeffrey Goldberg as Wilson
- Krutika Deo as Champa
- Jayant Kripalani as Gopal Talpade

== Production ==
=== Development and filming ===
The film was originally titled Bambai Fairytale. Interested in creating a realistic 1895 setting, the filmmakers re-created an entire city from scratch in Gondal, Gujarat. The team also recreates several antiques. Director Vibhu Puri stated in an interview, "Many artefacts that we read about aren’t available in this day and age. So, we used our imagination and recreated them. We even designed the plane based on how it was described in the books."

The makers of Hawaizaada recreated a plane from scratch as Puri wanted to depict Shivkar Talpade's first plane in all authenticity. For this, the team of Hawaizaada did extensive research on the products used in ancient times for making the plane that is shown in the film. The team used velvet, wood and canvas that was available at that time including all natural colors in painting the plane, and had to create about 25–30 models before finalizing the plane for the film. From these samples, only 2 small planes will be seen in the film. Also, In order to maintain the authenticity of the era and avoid fabrication, the makers kept every single detail in mind to re-create the plane.

The team was keen to install the plane at Girgaon Chowpatty, as that was where Shivkar Talpade’s first plane had taken off. But since the makers denied permissions from the authorities, the sequence was shot at Versova Beach in Mumbai.

Nearly 3,000 technicians had worked in this film for almost two years. The director insisted to bring "magical realism" for the audience.

=== Characterisation ===
Ayushmann Khurrana learned Marathi lines for the film, based on the character of Marathi scientist Shivkar Bapuji Talpade.

=== Costume design ===
Director Puri and his team did many look tests for Ayushmann Khurrana and Mithun Chakraborty, and the former tried on nine different hairstyles for this film. Sahil Kochhar, was the costume designer of the film. He and his team designed outfits according to the fabrics and colours available in that era. They made sure we didn’t use any nylon outfits as it had not been invented then. Similarly, the colour pink wasn't used then.

== Critical reception ==
Subhash K. Jha gave the film 4.5 stars out of 5, and stated "Hawaizaada, a film that soars into the skies with its overweening ambitions and miraculously manages to stay airborne as it chronicles the life a man who wanted to fly." The Times of India rated the film 2.5 out of 5 stating "Hawaizaada works because this story about India’s unsung hero needs to find its place. But this realm depends heavily on performances – the histrionics could be several notches higher." Rajeev Masand of CNN-IBN gave the film 2 out of 5 stars, stating that "The film is an interesting idea that never takes flight." Anupama Chopra gave the film 2 out of 5 stars, stating "Vibhu has designed Hawaizaada to be an all-purpose vehicle that has romance, comedy and drama . But the writing is flat and the telling, clumsy. Ayushmann, who is in nearly every frame, trembles with fervour. Mithun matches him. The respite here is Pallavi Sharda, who lifts this film."

Bollywood Hungama gave it 1.5 out of 5 stars stating that "If you watch the film with a feeling that you will be transported into the world of invention of the first ever man made desi flight, then, take our word for it that, you will be sorely disappointed, because the film actually is an extravagant 'costume musical'. The film barely touches upon anything that's got to do with the story pertaining to the first manmade Indian flight and is far away from reality. It is instead loaded with melodrama. At the end of the film, one really feels sorry for the film's producer because the over-expense was just not needed!" Koimoi gave the same rating noting the work of the design team in recreating the 1800s, but faulted the script for focusing on a fictional love story and too many songs rather than the historical story of the aeroplane's flight. Then stated that "Hawaizaada turned out to be a sheer disappointing watch. It has a yawn-inducing storyline which makes it difficult to watch even as it drags for over two hours. It is low on historical knowledge and even the execution is not top notch."

=== Box office ===
The film grossed ₹5 million (equivalent to ₹7.5 million or US$79,000 in 2023) on the opening day, with ₹6 million (equivalent to ₹9.1 million or US$95,000 in 2023) on Saturday and ₹7.5 million (equivalent to ₹11 million or US$120,000 in 2023) on Sunday, with grossing ₹18.5 million (equivalent to ₹28 million or US$290,000 in 2023) on the opening week. Then facing a drop on Monday, grossing ₹3.5 million (equivalent to ₹5.3 million or US$55,000 in 2023), total up to ₹23 million (equivalent to ₹35 million or US$360,000 in 2023) in 4 days. The film grossed ₹30 million (equivalent to ₹45 million or US$470,000 in 2023) in the first week, ₹0.8 million (equivalent to ₹1.2 million or US$13,000 in 2023) in the second week and in the third week, it grossed ₹80,470 at the box office. Bollywood Hungama reported US$13,440 as the earnings for the first weekend. According to the Indian trade website Box Office India, the film closing collections were ₹35.3 million (equivalent to ₹53 million or US$560,000 in 2023).

== Soundtrack ==
Hawaizaada

Soundtrack album by Rochak Kohli, Mangesh Dhakde, Ayushmann Khurrana and Vishal Bhardwaj
- Released: 29 December 2014
- Genre: Feature film soundtrack
- Length: 41:02
- Language: Hindi
- Label: T-Series
- Producer: Reliance Entertainment

The soundtrack of Hawaizaada features ten songs with three of them were composed by Rochak Kohli and four by Mangesh Dhakde. Actor Ayushmann Khurrana had composed and sung a popular ghazal of Mirza Ghalib, "Dil-E-Nadaan" which is sung by Jagjit Singh. He practised hard for singing and composing the number, and he composed it in overnight during the film's shoot. The song also has a reprise version, which is also composed and sung by Khurrana along with Shweta Subram. Vishal Bhardwaj was invited as a guest composer for the song "Dil Todne Ki Masheen" which is sung by Rekha Bharadwaj. The background score for the film is composed by Monty Sharma. Lyrics for all the songs, have been written by director Vibhu Puri.

No.	Title	Lyrics	Music	Artist(s)	Length
1.	"Hawaizaada"	Vibhu Puri	Rochak Kohli	Rochak Kohli	3:58
2.	"Daak Ticket"	Vibhu Puri	Rochak Kohli	Mohit Chauhan, Javed Bashir	4:07
3.	"Maazaa My Lord"	Vibhu Puri	Mangesh Dhakde	Mohit Chauhan, Neeti Mohan	5:31
4.	"Dil-E-Nadaan"	Mirza Ghalib	Ayushmann Khurrana	Ayushmann Khurrana	4:12
5.	"Udd Jayega"	Vibhu Puri	Mangesh Dhakde	Sukhwinder Singh, Ranadeep Bhasker	3:11
6.	"Dil Todne Ki Masheen"	Vibhu Puri	Vishal Bhardwaj	Rekha Bhardwaj	4:44
7.	"Yaadein Gatthri Mein"	Vibhu Puri	Mangesh Dhakde	Harshdeep Kaur	1:32
8.	"Turram Khan"	Vibhu Puri	Rochak Kohli	Papon, Ayushmann Khurrana, Monali Thakur	3:56
9.	"Dil-E-Nadaan (Reprise)"	Mirza Ghalib	Ayushmann Khurrana	Ayushmann Khurrana, Shweta Subram	4:00
10.	"Teri Dua"	Vibhu Puri	Mangesh Dhakde	Wadali Brothers, Lakhwinder Wadali, Harshdeep Kaur, Ravindra Sathe, Ranadeep Bhasker, Sukhwinder Singh	3:51
Total length:					41:02

== See also ==
- 2015 Indian Science Congress ancient aircraft controversy
- Vaimānika Shāstra, book by Subbaraya Sastri, featured in the film
