= Shamaiya Iyengar =

Indian politician

Shamaiya Iyengar or Shyama Iyengar(ಶ್ಯಾಮ ಐಯ್ಯಂಗಾರ್) popularly known as Anche Shamaiya(Anche Bakshi Shamaiah), son/descendent of Vasudeva Iyengar, was the minister of the police and the post office (also served as the intelligence department) during the time of Hyder Ali and Tipu Sultan. He was originally from Sulikunte in Kolar district of Karnataka (also known as Sulkunte), near Budikote in Bangarpet. It is said he was born in Shambonahali or Shamaiahhalli which was named after him(source: Mysore State Gazetteer) in the Tumkur district. His ancestors had been residing in Sulikunte(Sulakunte) agrahara formerly known as Soolikere village in Kolar district. He was of the Bharadvaja Gotra. He was a Valluraar Iyengar of the Thenkalai(Southern) Tradition i.e. he belonged to a family of Srivaishnavas who had migrated from Thiruvallur in Tamil Nadu into the current Kolar and Mysore regions and parts of Andhra in and around the times of Ramanujacharya (1000-1100 CE) possibly following his migration to Thirunarayanapuram or Melukote(Higher Fort) as it is called now .

== As Anche Shamaiah-Minister of the Post-office, Police and Intelligence Departments ==
Shamaiya had met Hyder when he was a young man. He rose to the height of his power when he was appointed as the head of the post office, police and intelligence departments(Anche Guritana ) which also served many other functions in 1776 after helping catch a corrupt official, Anche Thimmappa in hiding who had run off with significant money from the state treasury . It is said he used his agents and network of emissaries to track him down and bring him back to face justice. In 1779 Anche Shamaiah assumed the management of the districts on his leaving the official records under his elder brother Rangaiya, Shanubhogue of the Narasimhasvami temple(likely the one in Srirangapattinam also known as Keelukote or Lower Fort where the Mandyam Iyengar massacre took place later in 1783) , and on his undertaking to deposit in the treasury a crore of varahas over and above the estimated annual revenue receipts.

Shamaiah is accused of excesses in order to fulfil the treasury collection promised to Hyder but it may well be that he was part of a very excited, life-threatening and uncertain time trapped in a dangerous system and under the pressure of his boss Hyder. One such example includes the interrogation of Purnaiah. Purnaiah narrowly escaped from the department of police's actions on account of his associates petitioning Hyder.

The military officer Roome Zeree or Romee, the money-finder, a native of Constantinople and a commandant of infantry, was most associated with the department of torture which was undoubtedly associated with the department of police

Anche Shamiah possessed all the cool acuteness necessary for giving efficiency to Hyder's plans. Shamaiya rose high in the favour of Haidar, being honoured by him with an umbrella (Kode), medal ( padaka. ), pearl necklace(muthina-sara) aud palanquin (Pallakki), a cash present(inamu) of 5,000 varahas, and an allowance (daramaha) of 1,000 varahas, with a pair of shawls as khillat. His elder brother Rangaiya was granted an additional allowance of 30 varahas, while his younger brother Aprameya was placed in charge of the records of the treasury (Toshe-Khane ) and cavalry, infantry and other establishments (savar, baru, ahasham vagaire).

Shamaiah enjoyed great success as an all round administrator during the time of Hyder. It was said that shamaiah was so trusted and an important figure that all courtiers except Shamaiah were to compulsorily attend Tippoos wedding. Shamaih was left free to look after the affairs of the state even when the most important nobles and administrators were forced to attend the wedding. Shamaih was the only Hindu allowed to wear the mohammeden elite noble green headdress and ride on a palanquin during the time of Hyder.

== The Royalist Coup of 1783 ==
In 1782 Hyder Ali died and Tipu took power. In July 1783 an alleged insurrection to overthrow Tipu and reestablish the Hindu king was plotted. Shamaiya was believed to be the leader of the insurrection. It is not known whether Shamaiah was indeed inviolved in such a coup or if it was a fake trial with fake charges. Although C Hayavadana Rao in his History of Mysore book suggests Shamaiah may have been a royalist and after witnessing Hyders increased sidelining of the Mysore king in the latter days of his reign and Tipu's fanatic actions, the poor treatment of Maharani Lakshmi Ammani and the Mysore Wodeyar royals, he must have dediced to overthrow Tipu.

=== The Plot ===
Through this coup the conspirators aimed to restore the Hindu Wodeyar kings. Details of the plot from the 'HIstory of Mysore' by C Hayavadana Rao.

"the Hindu Raja, it was resolved, was to be nominally restored and Shamaiya, his elder brother Rangaiya and Narasinga Rao were to form the administration. the Killedar, the Head-Myar(Mir Amir) and Asad Khan, the Commandant, were to be captured and put to death; all the prisoners, European and other, were to be released and placed under the command of Gen. Matthews, and the whole of Asad Khan’s battalion was to be destroyed, and the gates of the capital to be seized, together with the magazines and treasures. Narasinga Bao undertook theactual execution of the material part of the plot. Letters were then despatched to the English army in the Coimbatore country, and to the Mahrattas and the Coorgs, seeking their assistance. To convince the English of the nature and extent of the Loyalist movement, seals and signatures of sufficient authenticity were obtained of the principal persons above named, of the commandants of corps, and particularly of Subbaraja Urs, ostensibly the representative of the imprisoned Royal Family, but in fact a descendant by the female line of the late Dalavai Devarajaiya. Rangaiya, through the medium of Singaiya at Coimbatore, kept up communication with the English army which was to ascend the ghats leading to Seringapatam at the period agreed. And intelligence from , Singaiya gave assurances of that army being ready to advance at the concerted notice whenever it should be given. Everything promised success. Rangaiya, however, considering further delay to be hazardous on account of the number of persons entrusted with the secret and the danger of treacherous or accidental discovery, pressed Narasinga Rao to strike the blow, and everything was prepared for nine o’clock on the 24th of July 1783, when the whole party were to meet at the general rendezvous point.

It was the pay-day of Asad Khan’s and some other Muhammadan corps, when he would Its failure. be present to superintend its distri-bution to the corps in waiting and without arms at the Cucheri, where the Killedar usually attended before the appointed hour. The treasury attendants, the corps of pioneers employed in moving the treasure, a body of jetties (professional athletes) who had the guard of that part of the palace, were all provided with daggers to commence the work with the destruction of the Killedar and his attendants, while large bodies of Hindu peons were ready to fall, in every direction, on the unarmed Muhammadans."

==== An English Prisoners View of Events ====
Details of the coup from 'Memoirs of the war in Asia, from 1780 to 1784. Including a narrative of the imprisonment and sufferings of our officers and soldiers, by an officer of Colonel Baillie's detachment. 1795':

This is an diary entry from 24 July 1783.

"At five o'clock, P. M. received intelligence of a project - contrived in order to reinstate the King of Mysore. How dangerous however this conspiracy. might appear to be, yet every member at first appeared steady and undaunted. The parties who entered into this plot, were the Inchivalla(Anche Shamaih), head post-master to Tippoo Saib, and keeper of the privy seals; the Prime Minister of the old King of Mysore; two Subadars; and nine other head men. One of the Subadars(Richard Hegan) had the command of one hundred men: the other had been a Subadar in Captain Keating's battalion; and taken prisoner at the fall of Amboor, a garrison in the Carnatic. - The whole of the conspirators assembled several times, and after matters were arranged, they each swore solemn to observe secrecy. Letters were then dispatched to our army, the Marratras, and Corakees(Kodavas), requiring their assistance: Every thing promised success. They then agreed to disperse for the present, and to meet at the general rendezvouz about seven the same evening: but unfortunately for them, and likewise for all the prisoners, the Subadar who had the command of the hundred men instantly went to the Keeladar and informed him of the whole plot. Guards were ordered, and the whole party secured and thrown into dungeons.

The first object of the conspirators was to have made sure of the Keeladar, the head Myar(Mir Amir), and Asoff Cawn(Asad Khan); these three were to have been instantly put to death: their next, to have released all the European and other prisoners, and then to have murdered the whole of Asoff Cawn's battalion, the sepoys of that corps having charge of all the magazines, gates, etc."

=== Betrayal and the Plot Uncovered ===
"Matters being thus arranged the Killedar Saiyid Muhammad Khan, while returning from the hall of business to his house on the night of the 23rd, was accosted in a whisper by the Subadar commanding one hundred men, who betrayed to him the whole plot. Forthwith, a dispatch prepared for transmission to the English army was seized, guards were ordered and the whole party secured and thrown into prison. Narasinga Rao made a full disclosure in the hope of pardon, and all the minor agents confessed to the degree of their actual information/ By way of intimidation, most of the conspirators were immediately done to death by the process of “ being stripped naked and dragged through the streets of the capital at the heels of elephants”; some, “with their noses and ears cut off and ridden on jack-asses ”, being hanged at the north gate of the fort. Tipu's orders were sought for the disposal of the perpetrators of the plot, and on the arrival of these orders, Narasinga Rao, Subbaraja Urs, the commandants of corps and the jetties were executed. Shamaiya was sent in heavy irons from Mangalore and with his brother Rangaiya was exposed to every contumely in separate iron cages — fed on “low diet,” occasionally “publicly flogged” near the English prison, and “his back rubbed with chillis, or cayenne pepper ” — where they are said to have persisted to the last in denying their participation in the crime, although the torture extracted considerable treasures. Shitab, the former Killedar of Seringapatam, who had been superseded by Saiyid Muhammad, was seized on the first alarm, on mere conjecture ; and was released later on a perfect conviction of his innocence. Order was restored in the capital, the inhabitants being forbidden by tom- tow to appear in the streets after nine o’clock at night, on pain of losing their noses and ears. The subadar who was responsible for the betrayal was soon made a commandant of Kallars (“Collieries”), with many other favours from the Nawab.

Thus failed the attempt. It is only necessary to add by way of explanation, that Shamaiya who is mentioned above as the leader and of the insurrection, was a Sri-Vaishnava Brahman of Sulakunte, in the Kolar district, and that his real name was Shama Aiyangar, his brother being Ranga Aiyangar. Though Wilks describes him as a human monster, there is reason to believe that he was an active loyalist from the moment the usurpation hardened into a fact, i.e., from the time that Haidar began to consolidate his position from de facto administrator of his master’s (Kartar's, i.e., Sovereign Lord’s) kingdom, as he called it, into his own de jure rule of it. When Haidar virtually dispossessed the Raja and displaced him in the public eye, Shama Aiyangar fell away from him and joined the band of Hindus and Muhammadans in the State who desired to end the unnatural state. of affairs set up by Haidar, and, what is worse, which Haidar tried to perpetuate in an aggravated form in his own family. "

=== Richard Hegan the Betrayer ===
Innes Munro, a contemporary source speaks of the whole event “ as a feasible plan of insurrection, in favour of the right king of Mysore, concerted at Seringapatam”. According’ to Innes Munro, the person who betrayed the whole plot was one Richard Hegan. Richard Hegan was a forcibly converted and circumcised European mohammedan. Innes Munro says “Just as the plan was ripe for execution, one Richard Hegan,” he writes, “who had deserted from the Company’s service, being led into the plot, made a discovery of the whole to the Governor on the very night before it was to take place.” “The fellow’s treachery, however,” he continues, “was the means of saving his life, as two soldiers of the 78rd regiment, suspicions of his fidelity, determined that night to put an end to his existence. He was afterwards made Commandant of the five hundred slaves as a recompense for his attachment to the interests of the Nabob” (lnnes Munro, o.c., 360). The Subadar of one hundred men, referred to in the text above, seems evidently to be identical with the Richard Hegan of Innes Munro.

=== Death and Torture of the Consiprators ===
Many alleged conspirators of this alleged coup were put to death instantly, it is not known why Shamaiya did not suffer the same fate. Shamaih was with Tipu at Mangalore when Tipu ordered him to be put in heavy iron's and sent to Srirangapattinam. His brother Ranga Iyengar a Bakshi(Head of the Department) in Srirangapattinam was arrested in Srirangapattinam. They were kept in separate iron cages and exposed to all kinds of insults and hardships. They were occasionally fed on a low diet(rice and water). Shamaiah was flogged publicly with chilli powder applied to his back and later blinded. Shamiaya and his brother Rangaiya persisted to their last in denying any involvement in the insurrection. Shamaiya was extremely popular and got along with all communities and all parties so well that Tipu kept him imprisoned instead of putting him to death immediately. Shamaiah's eyes were impaled and he was left blinded due to Tipu's Torture. Shamaih was still alive in January 1784.

James Scurry a prisoner at the time mentions that Shamiah and possibly Rangaiah and another were severally fed to the tigers. But it is unknown if his accounts are true or just hearsay. Shamaiah's family tree suggests he may have been freed and fathered a son in 1821. His family remembers Shamaiah as being blinded by Tipu's torture with no mention of his death. James Scurry Writes:

"Those tigers, above stated, were designed for the punishment of high crimes and misdemeanours : three of his principal officers, namely, his head inchewalla, or general postmaster, his buxey, or paymaster general, and another, were severally thrown to the tigers, and devoured in an instant, all but their heads; for which purpose the tigers were always kept hungry ! These all suffered within the short space of four months."

== The Aftermath of the 1783 Coup ==
=== Massacre of the Mandyam Iyengars ===
Around 700 mandyam iyengars of the Bharadwaja gotra, the same gotra as that of Shamaiah and of the Mysore Pradhans Tremalrow(Tirumala Iyengar) and Narainrow(Narayana Iyengar), including men women and children were massacred in large numbers near the same period circa 1783. were hung in a tamarind grove near the Sri Ranganathaswamy temple in Srirangapattinam. It is assumed that the involvement of Shamaih and the Mandyam Iyengar Mysore Pradhans in this coup was used to persecute peoples that had resisted the jizya tax and who had kept their loyalties to their old masters (The Wodeyar Dynasty).

The 21st century author Vikram Sampath in his book 'Splendours of Royal Mysore' mentions the brothers Tirumala Rao and Narayana Rao as being nephews of Anche Shamaiah but proof of this from contemporary sources is not found and Vikram Sampath's source for this connection is unknown, although all three belonging to the Bharadwaja Gotra may provide some plausibility for the two brothers having been related to Anche Shamaiah.

It is also said that many members of the Jyestimalla (Jetti) clan of Brahmin wrestlers and athletes were also massacred en masse at the same time. This is due to the threat perception that such Hindu athletes and warriors would be dangerous if a rebellion ever broke out. This community was and is still popularly known as the Jetti or the Jetti Pehelvan community in and around Mysore. They can be found in their wrestling establishments known as garadi mane in the Mysore region.

=== Tipu's Nirup in 1783 addressed to the Chief Temple Administrator in Melukote ===
Tipus Sanad in 1783 mentioning Shamaiah as Anche Shamaiya, indicating Tipu's attempt at provoke divisions between the tenkalai sect mandyam iyengars and vadakalai parakala mutt members after Shamaiah's downfall.

Extract from Sannad of Nawab Tippu Sultan Bahadur of Mysore (15 th September 1783 A.D.).

“The ‘Nirup ’ is addressed to Kuppaiya, Deva- sthanada-Sime-Parupatyagar or manager of the department of temples in the State to the system of reciting invocatory verses in the temple at Melukote (see above). It is stated in this nirup that Anche Shamaiya (an officer under Tlpu) was violating the old usage in the temple at Melukote regarding the use of invocatory verses and it was now ordained that both forms of invocation which begin with “Ramanuja-dayapatra. ” and “Srisailesha-daya- patra” might be used. Further the Parupatyadar was ordered to be fair to both the sects of Vadagalai and Tenkale (which used the above invocations) and to remove the image of Pillai Lokacharya (a saint of the Tenkalai sect) to its original place at Melukote and to take the God in procession to Kesavaswami mantapa and other mantapas and distribute tirtha (sacred water) and prasada consecrated food offered to God during the Tirunakshatra and conduct the services with zeal in the usual manner.”

== Shamaih's Treatment in prison ==
Details of Shamaih's treatment in captivity from 'Memoirs of the war in Asia, from 1780 to 1784. Including a narrative of the imprisonment and sufferings of our officers and soldiers, by an officer of Colonel Baillie's detachment. 1795':

Diary entry from 4 November 1783:

"The Inchivalla, who was the ring leader in the conspiracy still remains in heavy irons, and on low diet"

Diary entry from 4 January 1784:

"The Inchivalla was publicly. flogged, near our prison, and his back rubbed with chillies, or Cayenne pepper."

== Tipus Sanad in 1793 ==
A Sanad from 1793 survives which shows Tipu handing over authority of Shamaiya's home village to the Parakala Matha. The Sanad of Tipu Sultan in 1793 regarding Sulakunte Agrahara is a document that specifies the grant given to the Parakala Matha of Mysore by the ruler. The contents of the Sanad are as follows:

"The grant of the village of Sulakunte Agrahara, along with all its rights, revenues, and other benefits, to the Parakala Matha for its maintenance and upkeep.

The grant of the privilege to the Parakala Matha to hold a weekly market in the village, which would provide additional revenue to the Matha.

The grant of the right to construct tanks, canals, and other waterworks in the village, and to use the water thus obtained for agricultural purposes.

The stipulation that the Parakala Matha must pay an annual tribute of 1000 Pagodas to the government.

The requirement that the Parakala Matha must maintain law and order in the village, and ensure that the villagers pay their taxes regularly"

== Descendants and Family view of events ==
C Hayavadana Rao in his book 'History of Mysore' mentions Shamaiah's many descendents living in and around Sulakunte Agrahara in the 1800's. His descendants still live in and around Bengaluru, across India and many have migrated to the west.

=== Family Tree of Anche Shamaiah ===
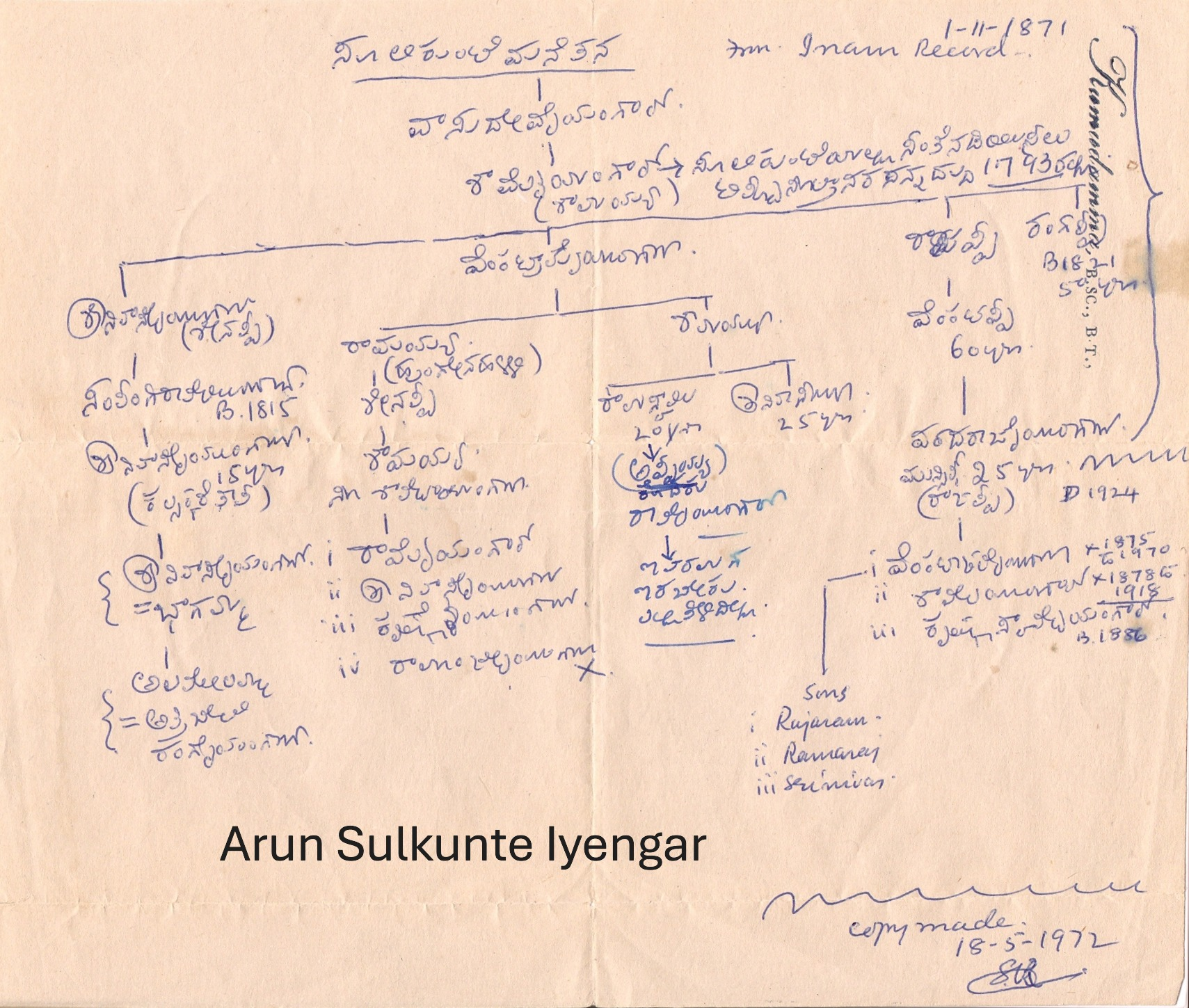
Family Tree of Anche Shamaih in the Kannada and English languages showing his descendants up to the early 20th Century with details of date of birth and death and age for some members.

Adherents of Shamaiya's family believe that Shyam Iyengar was a victim of political conspiracy by other jealous ministers and the political class at the time. Some accounts say that Shamaiya was killed in 1784 but he may well have been alive and fathered a son in 1821 as indicated by his family tree.

Shamaiya's elder brother Ranga Iyengar was also a highly placed officer under Tipu. Rangaiah was the head of the department at Srirangapattinam. His younger brother Aprameya was also given a position in the government.

He is also referred to as anche shamaiah, inchiwalla, inchivalla, anchewalla, shamia in many records. Rangaiah has been referred to as Bungea, Rungea, Rungeia in many records.

He was such a famous part of Mysore during the time of Hyder and Tipu that many English, Muslim and Mysore Wadiyar commissioned historians have mentioned him in many books. He was in touch with the British, Persians and French. He was a man of great character but ultimately He was a victim of circumstances of his time. Left blinded by Tipus torture and sidelined by the British, he was a victim of the circumstances of his time. He was probably born near the mid-1700s and died somewhere near 1820s. His family tree suggests he fathered a son in 1821. He is survived by many descendants. Although a lot of property was confiscated from Shamaiah, he still had a good amount of property to his name and his descendants were large landowners with one of his descendants of the same name "Sulkunte(Su) Shyama Iyengar" living in the late 1800s and early 1900s was only one of two tax payers to pay more than 1000 rupees in land tax in the entire Kolar district.

Shamaih was an administrator and military leader whose responsibilities encompassed diplomacy, internal governance, and warfare. Trained in scholarship and accounting, he maintained working relations with Hyder Ali, Tipu Sultan, the British, and the French, though his career was ultimately shaped by the political instability of the period.
