= Sanjeev Sanyal =

Indian economist and writer

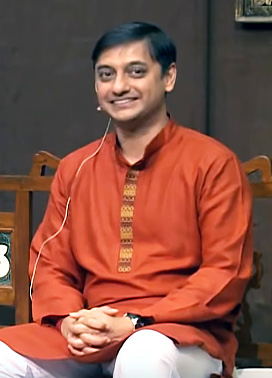
- Sanyal in 2016

Member of the Economic Advisory Council to the Prime Minister (EAC-PM)
- Incumbent
- Assumed office 22 February 2022

Chancellor of Gokhale Institute of Politics and Economics
- Incumbent
- Assumed office 7 October 2024
- Preceded by: Bibek Debroy

Principal Economic Advisor, Department of Economic Affairs, Ministry of Finance
- In office 21 February 2017 – 20 February 2022

Personal details
- Born: 27 August 1970 (age 56) Calcutta, West Bengal, Indian
- Relatives: Sachindra Nath Sanyal (granduncle); Nalinaksha Sanyal (mother's grandfather)
- Education: Shri Ram College of Commerce, Delhi, (BA Economics); St John's College, Oxford, (BA Economics); University of Oxford, (MSc Economics)
- Occupation: Economist; Writer

Sanjeev Sanyal (born 27 August 1970) is an Indian economist and popular historian who writes books of revisionist Hindutva history that lack scholarly backing. A member of the Economic Advisory Council to the Prime Minister of India, he has helped prepare six editions of the Economic Survey of India and has represented India at G7 and OECD meetings. He is also the Chancellor of Gokhale Institute of Politics and Economics.

== Early life and education ==
Sanjeev Sanyal was born in Calcutta (now Kolkata) and studied at St. Xavier's School and St. James' School. He received a Bachelor's degree in economics from Shri Ram College of Commerce, Delhi University. He then went to St John's College, University of Oxford, where he received a BA in philosophy, politics and economics in 1992, he was a Rhodes scholar, and received an MSc in Economics in 1994.

== Career ==
=== Deutsche Bank ===
Sanyal began working in financial markets in the 1990s. He worked as chief economist for South and Southeast Asia at Deutsche Bank until 2008, leaving to research and write Land of the Seven Rivers, and returned in 2011. By end-2015, when he resigned, he was a managing director. (Note: Deutsche Bank has many employees whose job title is managing director. For example, in January 2019, Deutsche Bank promoted 63 employees in Europe and 24–36 in the United States to managing director positions.)

=== Government of India ===
In February 2017, he was appointed as the Principal Economic Adviser to the Indian Ministry of Finance and in that job helped prepare six editions of the Economic Survey of India. In February 2022, he was appointed member of the Economic Advisory Council to the Prime Minister in the rank of the Secretary to Government of India. Sanyal has also represented India at G7 and OECD meetings.

=== Miscellaneous ===
In 2004, he and environmental economist Pavan Sukhdev created the Green Indian States Trust to promote sustainable development. He has also served on the Future City Sub-Committee of the Singapore government tasked with building a long-term vision for the city-state.

In March 2023, Sanyal led the first edition of the Delhi University Literature Festival as its patron, alongside Swapan Dasgupta as the festival director. On 7 October 2024, he was appointed as the Chancellor of the Gokhale Institute of Politics and Economics (GIPE), replacing Bibek Debroy. In April 2025, Sanyal was removed by GIPE and reinstated within days owing to "lack of communication".

== Economic Views ==
Sanyal has been a vocal critic of Nehruvian socialism, which he deems to have stemmed from an "inward-looking cultural attitude". Nehru and P. C. Mahalanobis are criticised by Sanyal for treating the economy as a "mechanical toy", leaving little scope for the "flourish of private enterprises", and ultimately "throttling creativity". Sanyal praises the 1991 liberalisation reforms as the harbinger of Indian Renaissance, and argues for the application of Complex Adaptive Systems framework to economic issues.

Sanjeev Sanyal called India’s judicial system the "single biggest hurdle" to achieving “Viksit Bharat”(Developed India) by 2047, citing the "99-1 problem" where regulations get overcomplicated to prevent 1% misuse due to slow dispute resolution. He criticised colonial legacies like “my lord” terminology for the judges, "prayer" terminology for petitions, long court vacations that halt the whole system, and compulsory pre-litigation mediation that fails 98–99% of the time while adding delays. He urged urgent judicial reforms and warned India has just 20–25 years to use its demographic dividend before ageing like Japan and Europe.

Sanyal says that the primary goal of September 2025 GST rate cuts is to enhance economic efficiency by simplifying the tax system, not just one-time savings. He emphasising the need for public pressure to ensure businesses pass benefits to consumers. He champions "process reforms," which are small, meticulous, sectoral changes crucial for improving the ease of doing business.

Sanyal argues that it has been his long-standing view that H-1B visas primarily benefit the US companies, questioning why India negotiates for these long-term visas when it primarily benefits foreign companies. Instead, the foreign countries should be negotiating it with India, not vice versa. It has "entirely been unclear" to him how it benefits Indians. Giving it up as a negotiating point to foreign countries, when the IT sector can "work from anywhere", is not beneficial to India.

== History Views ==
Sanyal argued that the historiography of India has been distorted with "Colonial, Nehruvian, and Marxist" biases — thus, requiring a "rewriting" of history by "properly revisiting" primary sources. In The Ocean of Churn, Sanyal argues that the primary sources used in painting a humane image of Ashoka can also be interpreted to reconstruct him as a genocidal tyrant. According to Sanyal, Ashoka did not convert to Buddhism out of laments at the Kalinga War but due to political pressure exerted by the Jains. A host of other sources are invoked to compare Ashoka with "modern day fundamentalists", whose Dhaṃma Mahāmātās were "religious police"; the famed edicts about religious tolerance are read as propaganda.

Sanyal blames the Nehruvian project for having established Ashoka as a "great king", and stresses on the urgent need of a post-socialist reading of history. In Sanyal's version of this reading, the central character is Chanakya, a "professor of Political Economy at Taxila university" [sic] who had helped Chandragupta Maurya establish a pan-Indian empire and who then wrote Arthashastra about a centralised Mauryan economy. Only when the Arthashastra is retrofitted to India's current political economy —by fixing the judicial system, investing in internal security, and simplifying taxation rules— among other things, Sanyal believes that we can return to the "golden age" of India that had birthed "yoga, algebra, the concept of zero, chess, plastic surgery, metallurgy, Hinduism, [and] Buddhism."

=== Reception and Criticism ===
Professional historians have rejected Sanyal's revisionism, which they identify as Hindutva revisionism. Meera Visvanathan, a historian of ancient India, finds him ignorant of methodologies in historical research. For all his clarion calls to go back to primary sources, Sanyal's citations remained restricted to secondary sources and mostly, mainstream histories that he sought to critique. In deconstructing the narrative of Ashoka, Sanyal failed to apply source-criticism (Note: Sanyal is noted to have subjected contemporary edicts, Buddhist hagiographies, and Sri Lankan legends to the same treatment.) and imposed a host of anachronistic categories on the past; likewise, Sanyal remained oblivious of recent scholarship on Mauryan India (Note: Visvanathan emphasises the documented fuzziness of the Mauryan economy and the determination that Arthshastra was the work of multiple post-Mauryan scholars.) and misrecognised a shastra of political economy, as it developed in Ancient India, as a manual of Mauryan statecraft. Similarly, Sanyal's analysis of the Mahabharata was held to be an exercise in speculation to fit preconceived notions of history. Overall, Visvanathan found his works to be "riddled with holes" which commanded popularity among masses only because of Sanyal's "rhetorical flourish" and a simplicity that synced to majoritarian prejudices — Sanyal's work having not been critiqued or contested by professional historians, who have never taken him seriously, is why, Visvanathan suggests, he has grown in stature and confidence.

Rohan D'Souza, a historian of South Asia at Kyoto University, approved of Visvanathan's critique as a "reality-check" to Sanyal's amateur efforts at rewriting history. R. Mahalakshmi, a historian of ancient India at Jawaharlal Nehru University, held Sanyal's reinterpretation of Ashoka to be entirely lacking in "contextual understanding" of the King and a politically motivated endeavour on the overall.

Popular historians and non-historians have been more fixed on Sanyal. Manu Pillai commended The Ocean of Churn for being a "delightful introduction to the world of the Indian Ocean" despite the possibility of professional scholars challenging his narrative and conclusions; he welcomed Sanyal's command over a layered and complex past, his "accessible" yet "captivating narrative", and especially the reevaluation of Ashoka. Shiv Visvanathan, a social anthropologist specialising in science and technology studies, praised the same work for being a feisty, combative, and comprehensive history of the Indian Ocean aimed at a general audience; like Pillai, he commended the "devastating" reconstruction of Ashoka and recovering figures from the margins of history. Nonetheless, Visvanathan cautioned that "a professional historian might crib" at Sanyal's efforts.

Sanyal has been accused of unfairly blaming the judiciary for India’s failures, while failing to question the actions or inaction of the government and Parliament, including outdated laws, misconceived new laws, inadequate infrastructure, the government’s own frivolous litigation, and broader deficits in the rule of law, all of which place immense pressure on the understaffed judiciary.

Sanyal objects to professional historical critiques and has criticized Wikipedia for including them.

== Honours ==
Sanyal was awarded an Eisenhower Fellowship in 2007 for his work on urban issues. In 2010, he was named Young Global Leader by the World Economic Forum. He has been an Adjunct Fellow of the Institute of Policy Studies at the National University of Singapore and Senior Fellow of IDFC Institute (Mumbai). Sanyal has been a fellow of the Royal Geographical Society, London, visiting scholar at Oxford University, adjunct fellow at the Institute of Policy Studies (Singapore), and a senior fellow of the World Wide Fund for Nature (formerly World Wildlife Fund).

In 2022, Sanyal's Revolutionaries: The Other Story of How India Won its Freedom won the best Non-fiction Book Award 2022 in English at the Kalinga Literary Festival. In 2023, he was awarded the KPS Menon Memorial Award for 2023 for his contributions to economic policy-making and public service.

== Works ==
=== Books ===
- The Indian Renaissance: India's Rise After A Thousand Years of Decline, World Scientific, 2008, 264 p.
- Land of the Seven Rivers: A Brief History of India's Geography, Penguin, 2013, 192 p.
- The Incredible History of India's Geography, Penguin, 2015, 264 p.
- The Ocean of Churn: How the Indian Ocean Shaped Human History, Penguin, 2017, 324 p.
- Life over Two Beers and Other Stories, Penguin, 2018, 232 p.
- India in the Age of Ideas: Select Writings, 2006-2018, Westland, 2018, 318 p.
- Revolutionaries : The Other Story of How India Won Its Freedom, HarperCollins India, 2023, 364 p.
- The Incredible History of The Indian Ocean, Penguin, 2020, 298 p.

=== Columns ===
Sanyal is an occasional columnist for the Hindustan Times, Project Syndicate, The Economic Times, Live Mint, Business Standard, Swarajya, and several other publications.

== See also ==
- Swapan Dasgupta
- Rajeev Malhotra
- J Sai Deepak
- Vikram Sampath
