= Vaimānika Shāstra =

Sanskrit text on aeronautics

Title page of the English translation of Vyamanika Shastra published in 1973

The Vaimānika Shāstra (वैमानिक शास्त्र, lit. "shastra on the topic of Vimanas" or "science of aeronautics", sometimes also rendered Vimanika, Vymanika or Vyamanika) is a 20th-century text in Sanskrit. It makes the claim that the vimānas mentioned in ancient Sanskrit epics were advanced aerodynamic flying vehicles.

The existence of the text was revealed in 1952 by G. R. Josyer, who asserted that it was written by Pandit Subbaraya Shastry (1866–1940), who dictated it during the years 1918–1923. A Hindi translation was published in 1959, while the Sanskrit text with an English translation was published in 1973. It contains 3000 shlokas in 8 chapters which Shastry claimed were psychically delivered to him by the ancient Hindu sage Bharadvaja. The text has gained favour among proponents of ancient astronauts.

A study by aeronautical and mechanical engineering researchers at the Indian Institute of Science, Bangalore, in 1974 concluded that the aircraft described in the text were "poor concoctions" and that the author showed a complete lack of understanding of aeronautics. Regarding the "Rukma Vimana", the study noted, "If the craft is taken to mean what the drawing and the text say, it can be stated that the craft is a decided impossibility".

== Origin and publication ==
The existence of the text was revealed in 1952 by G. R. Josyer. Josyer asserted that it was written by Pandit Subbaraya Shastry (1866–1940), who dictated it during the years 1918–1923. A Hindi translation was published in 1959, while the Sanskrit text with an English translation was published in 1973. It contains 3000 shlokas in 8 chapters which Shastry claimed were psychically delivered to him by the ancient Hindu sage Bharadvaja. The text has gained favour among proponents of ancient astronauts. The Vaimānika Śāstra manuscript appeared at the Rajakiya Sanskrit Library, Baroda, by 1944. The text was published in Hindi in 1959 and later in English by G.R. Josyer, titled Vymanika Shastra. Josyer's edition also added illustrations drawn by T. K. Ellappa, a draughtsman at a local engineering college in Bangalore, under the direction of Shastry, which had been missed in the 1959 edition.

Its existence was first announced publicly in a 1952 press release by G.R. Josyer, who had founded his "International Academy of Sanskrit Research" in Mysore the year before. In the foreword to the 1973 publication that contained the full Sanskrit text with English translation, Josyer quotes a 1952 press release of his which was "published in all the leading dailies of India and was taken up by Reuter and other World Press News Services":

Mr G. R. Josyer, Director of the International Academy of Sanskrit Research in Mysore, in the course of an interview recently, showed some very ancient manuscripts which the Academy had collected. He claimed that the manuscripts were several thousands of years old, compiled by ancient rishis, Bharadwaja, Narada and others, dealing not with the mysticism of the ancient Hindu philosophy of Atman or Brahman, but with more mundane things vital for the existence of man and the progress of nations both in times of peace and war. [...] One manuscript dealt with aeronautics and the construction of various types of aircraft for civil aviation and for warfare. [...] Mr Josyer showed some types of designs and drawings of a helicopter-type cargo-loading plane, specially meant for carrying combustibles and ammunition; passenger aircraft carrying 400 to 500 persons; and double- and triple-decked aircraft. Each of these types had been fully described.

Josyer then tells how he was visited by "Miss Jean Lyon, journalist of Toronto and New York" for an interview, and how Lyon in her Just Half a World Away (1954) concluded that he was "guilty of a rabid nationalism, seeking to wipe out everything since the Vedas".

A critical review pronounced Josyer's introduction to be "least scholarly by any standards" and said that "the people connected with publication – directly or indirectly – are solely to blame either for distorting or hiding the history of the manuscripts", perhaps in an attempt to "eulogise and glorify whatever they can find about our past, even without valid evidence". By tracing the provenance of the manuscript, interviewing associates of Shastry (including G. V. Sharma, to whom the text was originally dictated), and based on the linguistic analysis of the text, the review concluded that it came into existence sometime between 1900 and 1922.

== Structure and content ==
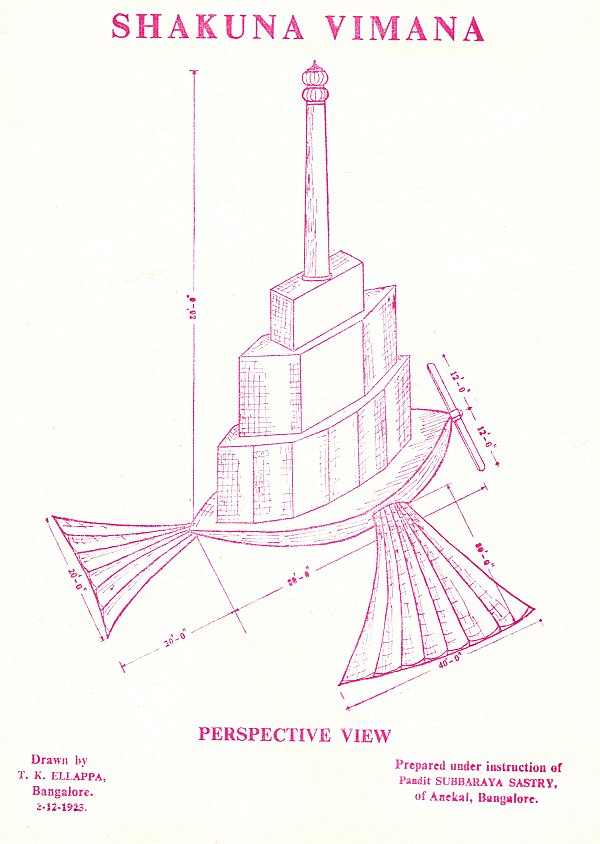
An illustration of the Shakuna Vimana that is supposed to fly like a bird with hinged wings and tail.

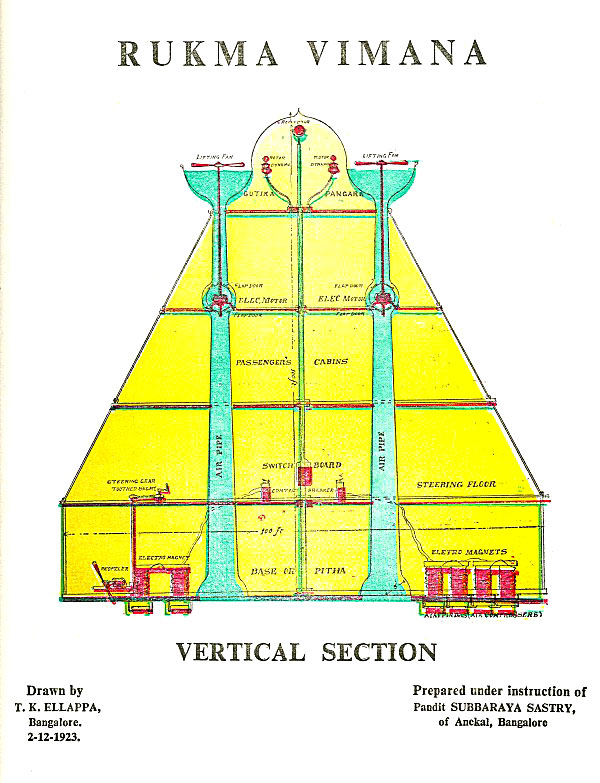
An illustration of Rukma Vimana

Unlike modern treatises on aeronautics that begin by discussing the general principles of flight before detailing concepts of aircraft design, the Vaimānika Shāstra starts with a quantitative description, as though a particular aircraft is being described. The topics covered include "definition of an airplane, a pilot, aerial routes, food, clothing, metals, metal production, mirrors and their uses in wars, varieties of machinery and yantras, and planes like ‘mantrik’, ‘tantrik’, and ‘kritak’", and four planes called Shakuna, Sundara, Rukma, and Tripura are described in greater detail. The extant text is claimed to be only a small (one-fortieth) part of a larger work, Yantra Sarvaswa ("All about machines"), composed by Maharishi Bharadwaj and other sages for the "benefit of all mankind".

== Appraisal ==
J. B. Hare of the Internet Sacred Text Archive in 2005 compiled an online edition of Josyer's 1973 book in the site's "UFOs" section. In his introduction, Hare writes,

The Vaimānika Śāstra was first committed to writing between 1918 and 1923, and nobody is claiming that it came from some mysterious antique manuscript. The fact is, there are no manuscripts of this text before 1918, and nobody is claiming that there are. So on one level, this is not a hoax. You just have to buy into the assumption that 'channelling' works. ... there is no exposition of the theory of aviation (let alone antigravity). In plain terms, the Vaimānika Śāstra never directly explains how Vimanas get up in the air. The text is top-heavy with long lists of often bizarre ingredients used to construct various subsystems. ... There is nothing here which Jules Verne couldn't have dreamed up, no mention of exotic elements or advanced construction techniques. The 1923 technical illustrations based on the text ... are absurdly unaerodynamic. They look like brutalist wedding cakes, with minarets, huge ornithopter wings and dinky propellers. In other words, they look like typical early 20th-century fantasy flying machines with an Indian twist.

A 1974 study by researchers at the Indian Institute of Science, Bangalore, found that the heavier-than-air aircraft that the Vaimānika Śāstra described were aeronautically unfeasible. The authors remarked that the discussion of the principles of flight in the text was largely perfunctory and incorrect, in some cases violating Newton's laws of motion. The study concluded:

Any reader by now would have concluded the obvious – that the planes described above are the poor concoctions, rather than expressions of something real. None of the planes has properties or capabilities of being flown; the geometries are unimaginably horrendous from the point of view of flying; and the principles of propulsion make them resist rather than assist flying. The text and the drawings do not correlate with each other, even thematically. The drawings definitely point to a knowledge of modern machinery. This can be explained on the basis of the fact that Shri Ellappa, who made the drawings, was in a local engineering college and was thus familiar with names and details of some machinery. Of course the text retains a structure in language and content from which its 'recent nature' cannot be asserted. We must hasten to point out that this does not imply an oriental nature of the text at all. All that may be said is that thematically the drawings ought to be ruled out of discussion. And the text, as it stands, is incomplete and ambiguous by itself and incorrect in many places.

The authors expressed puzzlement at the contradiction and errors in the Vaimānika Śāstra text, especially since its compilers supposedly had access to publications that did not make such errors (such as Dayanand Saraswati's commentary on the Rigveda published in 1878 or earlier).

== Controversy ==
The 102nd Indian Science Congress, held at Mumbai University in January 2015, organised a session on "ancient sciences through Sanskrit" in which a presentation on Vaimānika Śāstra was included. It was delivered by Anand J. Bodas, a pilot, and Ameya Jadhav, who holds an M.A. in Sanskrit as well as an M.Tech. degree. Bodas, speaking to the news media, has said that the aeroplanes of Vedic times could fly not only from country to country but also "from planet to planet". "In those days, aeroplanes were huge in size and could move left and right, as well as backwards, unlike modern planes, which only fly forward," he added. Ram Prasad Gandhiraman, a NASA scientist, launched an online petition demanding that the talk be cancelled, as it represents pseudoscience.

Vaimānika Shāstra and vimanas are also mentioned in works about pseudoscience, such as Regal's Pseudoscience: A Critical Encyclopedia. According to Regal, vimanas are one of the common attempts to fit elements of ancient cultures into contemporary narratives. When put under scrutiny, the Vaimānika Shāstra "comes off as jibberish [sic]".

== In popular culture ==
- Prapaatha, a 2010 Indian Kannada-language film by Suchendra Prasad, has a story line where a young man tries to find out works of Subbaraya Shastry.
- In the 2015 Indian Hindi-language film Hawaizaada about Shivkar Bapuji Talpade (portrayed by Ayushman Khurrana ), Vaimānika Shāstra and Pandit Subbaraya Shastry (portrayed by Mithun Chakraborty) have been shown as the main reasons behind "India's first unmanned plane".

== See also ==
- Hindutva pseudohistory
- NCERT textbook controversies
- Aircraft in fiction
- Claims to the first powered flight
- Quimbaya artifacts, in Colombia, subject of pseudoarchaelogical claims
- Chariots of the Gods?, 1968 pseudoscientific book by Erich von Däniken
- Pranava-Vada of Gargyayana, pseudoscientific book about Hinduism by Bhagwan Das
