= 2015 Indian Science Congress ancient aircraft controversy =

Protest against a conference presentation

The 2015 Indian Science Congress ancient aircraft controversy refers to protests that occurred during the 102nd Indian Science Congress in Mumbai on 4 January 2015 when a paper claiming to prove that aircraft were invented in the Vedic age was allowed to be presented.

== Overview ==
In December 2014, it was announced that Anand J. Bodas and his copresenter Ameya Jadhav, who claim that aircraft more advanced than today's versions existed in ancient India, would be allowed to speak at the Indian Science Congress and present a paper on aviation in the Vedic age. During an interview, he said that such aircraft were huge and could fly to other planets. He also said that those planes could fly backwards, left, or right, contrary to modern aircraft that can fly only forward.

Bodas, who was a principal at a pilot training school in Kerala, and Jadhav, currently a lecturer at the Swami Vivekanand International School and Junior College in Mumbai, cited a text called Vaimanika Prakaranam (also called Vaimānika Shāstra) as evidence. Scientists from the Indian Institute of Science studied the text in 1974, concluding that "craft is a decided impossibility" and that the Vaimānika Shāstra was written no earlier than 1904. Bodas stated that modern science rejects anything that it cannot explain. He claimed that of the 500 guidelines described in the text, only 100 to 120 survive today. He attributed this loss to the passage of time, foreign rulers of India and artefacts which had been stolen from India during that time.

The five-day conference was held at the Kalina Campus of Mumbai University starting on 3 January 2015. The paper was presented on 4 January as a part of the larger symposium on "Ancient Sciences Through Sanskrit". Other papers presented in the symposium were "Engineering applications of Ancient Indian botany", "Neuroscience of yoga: understanding the process", "Advances in surgery in Ancient India" and "Scientific principles of Ancient Indian architecture and civil engineering".

== Criticism and protests ==
In late December 2014, Ram Prasad Gandhiraman, a scientist at NASA's Ames Research Center, started a petition to prevent the paper from being presented at the conference. By 31 December, 220 scientists and academics had signed the petition. Gandhiraman criticised the paper as pseudo-science and said that mythology should not be mixed with science.

S. M. Deshpande, a professor at the Indian Institute of Science, Bangalore, who has written a paper with four others on aircraft in Sanskrit texts, said that we should not reject such claims as pseudoscience outright but examine them with intellectual curiosity. His paper, however, states that the aircraft described in the Vaimānika Shāstra text would not be capable of flying, and the text itself cannot be traced to any date before 1904.

H.S. Mukunda, another professor at the Indian Institute of Science, Bangalore, who was a co-author of the paper, criticised the organisers and said that both sides of the debate should be presented. He asked why there had been no working models made if the persons who presented the paper were convinced that they were right.

Roddam Narasimha, director of National Aerospace Laboratories (NAL), said that there is no credible evidence that aviation existed in ancient India. He added that the Vaimānika Shāstra text has been studied scientifically, and the consensus is that descriptions in the text are unscientific.

Notable Indian astrophysicist and founding director of the Inter-University Centre for Astronomy and Astrophysics at Pune, India, Jayant Narlikar reacted to the controversy, saying that it was good to be proud of ancient Indian science, but scientists should not make claims about things they did not have proof of. He commented, "We can boast of things, but it should be restricted to what we have proof of. But we shouldn't claim things of which there is no evidence or proof, as it reduces the credibility of what our scientists have achieved in the past." He further asserted, "Even the West recognises the knowledge of mathematics held by Indians. If we start making outlandish claims, the scientific community of the world will not look up to us as it does now".

Economist and Nobel laureate Amartya Sen commented that some evidence is required in the controversial claims made in the Indian Science Congress regarding the achievements of ancient Indians. He said, "The idea that human beings can fly is known to human beings from birth. The idea that human beings might be able to be on the air has been talked about a lot. If that was true, then we would like to find some evidence." Further, he elaborated, "As our epics show, Indians have thought about flying for a long time. But it would be fanciful to say that India invented the aeroplane. If ancient India had airfare technology, we would like to see some evidence. I agree there are a lot of claims that have nothing to do with achievements."

== Support ==
Gauri Mahulikar, the head of the department of Sanskrit at Mumbai University, said that the paper would have been easily dismissed if it had been presented by Sanskrit professors. But, since Bodas was a pilot and Ameya Jadhav had a Master of Technology and a Master of Arts in Sanskrit, it supposedly could not be rejected easily.

== See also ==
- Vimana
- Hindutva pseudohistory
- Ancient astronauts
