= Savarkar (book) =

Book about Vinayak Damodar Savarkar

- Part 1: Echoes from a Forgotten Past, 1883–1924; Part 2: A Contested Legacy, 1924-1966
- Author: Vikram Sampath
- Country: India
- Language: English
- Genre: Biography
- Publisher: Penguin (India Viking)
- Published: Part 1: August 2019; Part 2: May 2021
- Media type: Print/Digital
- No. of books: 2
- Website: Part 1 Part 2

Savarkar is a two-part biography about Indian politician and ideologue Vinayak Damodar Savarkar, written by Indian popular historian and columnist Vikram Sampath and published by Penguin Viking. The book met with a critical reception from scholars as well as accusation of plagiarism.

== About ==
The series contains two books. The first book covers Savarkar’s life until 1924, including his years in London and imprisonment. The second book covers the later years of Savarkar, until 1966. It includes Savarkar's work with the Hindu Mahasabha and the Rashtriya Swayamsevak Sangh (RSS), his opposition to Gandhi’s non-violence, his implication and acquittal in Gandhi’s assassination and its overall impact on his contentious legacy.

Sampath has said that a motivation to write the book was that no comprehensive biography of Savarkar had been written since the 1960s, yet Savarkar was used in political discourse often, where the demand to give Savarkar a Bharat Ratna, India's highest civilian award, had even been brought up recently.

== Reception ==
The book was critiqued by several academics.

Janaki Bakhle, an associate professor of Indian history at University of California, Berkeley who reviewed the volumes for India Today, noted despite meticulous and thorough research, Sampath's contribution is wholly uncritical, and he accepts every primary source at face value; Bakhle criticised Sampath's interpretation of concurrent historical events as non-objective and lacking in updates from relevant scholarship. Vikram Visana, a Lecturer in Political Theory at the University of Leicester criticises him for failing to put Savarkar's "rhetorical historywriting" that makes use of "epic heroism and myth-making" to incite "revolutionary violence" into context with his narrative. He also criticises him for taking Savarkar's allegations of abuse by Muslim prison wardens in Savarkar's My transportation for life at face value. Reviewing for Open, popular historian Manu S. Pillai voiced similar concerns; he praised Sampath's meticulous research and his persuasive case of Savarkar as a martyr who had sacrificed his youth for the cause of nation but criticised his methodologies, especially the uncritical acceptance of Savarkar's self-laudatory memoirs, and Sampath was held to be an unobjective biographer.

Madhav Khosla, professor of Political Science at Columbia Law School who reviewed the work for Hindustan Times, commended the detailed narrative but found Sampath's treatment of Savarkar's extremist views and his relationship with the British government less "thoughtful" when compared to another contemporary biography by Vaibhav Purandare. Salil Tripathi, reviewing for Mint, found Sampath's choice of language and analyses to "give away" his obvious bias despite the façade of neutrality; particular attention was drawn to the cavalier descriptions of any massacre perpetrated by Muslims as "genocides".

In contrast, Swati Parashar, a professor at the University of Gothenburg who reviewed the volumes for The Hindu, called the comprehensive treatment of Savarkar a "must-read", admiring how he brought out "the contradictions, complexities and complicities" that made Savarkar. Reviewing for The Telegraph, TCA Raghavan described the book as "a straightforward, no-fuss narrative without hyperbole and hero worship".

== Plagiarism allegations ==
In a letter to the president of the Royal Historical Society dated 11 February 2022, professors Audrey Truschke, Rohit Chopra, and Ananya Chakravarti accused Sampath of plagiarism and requested Sampath's membership be reviewed and his scholarship be thoroughly examined. The letter includes as examples sections from a 2017 article by Sampath published in India Foundation Journal and an example from his biography of Savarkar, in which a paragraph was nearly identical to one in an undergraduate student thesis. It was later supplemented with more examples of identical reproduction from the works of Chaturvedi and R. C. Majumdar. Sampath rejected the allegations and filed a defamation suit in Delhi High Court seeking costs of ₹two crore (271,000 USD).
