= Tipu Sultan: The Saga of Mysore's Interregnum (1760–1799) =

2024 history book about the Kingdom of Mysore

Tipu Sultan: The Saga of Mysore’s Interregnum (1760–1799) is a book written by Vikram Sampath, published by Penguin Random House in 2024. The book contains 904 pages, divided into 20 chapters. The foreword has been written by SL Bhyrappa. The book describes the event from Haider Ali overthrowing the Mysore kingdom up to Tipu's death.

== About ==
The book gives a historical account of the Haider Ali and Tipu Sultan, with primary focus on their political, military, religious and administrative policies. According to the author, the books gives “an unbiased and fact-based, objective assessment of this eighteenth-century monarch of Mysore”.

The first nine chapters of the book have been dedicated to Haider Ali. In the tenth chapter, the author describes transfer of power from Haider to Tipu and compares both of them. The remaining chapters have been dedicated to Tipu’s reign. A few events mentioned in the book include Treaty of Mangalore, Second Anglo-Mysore War, plight of Mandyam Iyengars and Christians of Mangalore, etc. The primary references for the contents of the book include several Persian records, Tipu's Tarikh-i-Khudadadi and other documents like the Diocese's record.

== Reception ==
In his review in India Today, Prosenjit Nath mentions that the book provides critical analysis of the military strategy adopted by Tipu and the impact it played in Indian history. He writes that “The book also addresses the historiographical distortions that have shaped Tipu’s image. Sampath critiques the romanticized accounts of Left-leaning historians who downplay or ignore the sultan’s bigotry and violence. The revenue code’s provisions, which incentivized conversions to Islam through tax exemptions, further debunk the myth of his egalitarianism.” He remarks that the detailed description of war and military strategy seemed excessive to readers.

Mahitosh Gopal in his review in Asian Review of Books writes that the book is a “is a monumental act of historical restoration, not of a hero, not of a villain, but of a man who was both, and neither.” According to him Sampath portrays Tipu neither as a “nationalist martyr” nor as a “religious despot,” but as someone who carries the “burden of both.”
