= Vimana =

Flying palaces or chariots described in Hindu texts and Sanskrit epics

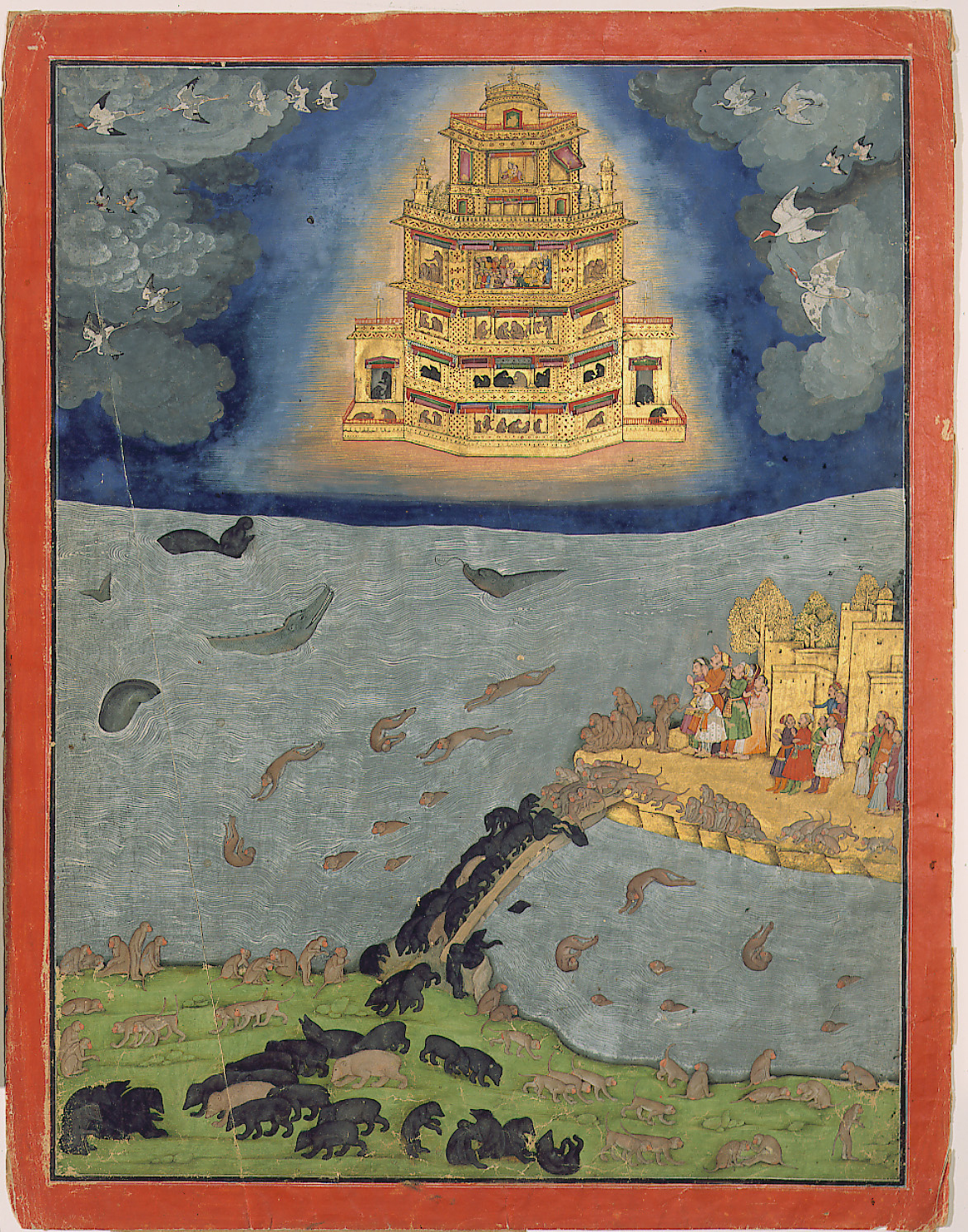
The Pushpaka vimana flying in the sky. Pahari school c.1650

Vimāna are mythological flying palaces or chariots described in Hindu texts and Sanskrit epics. The "Pushpaka Vimana" of Ravana (who took it from Kubera; Rama returned it to Kubera) is the most quoted example of a vimana. Vimanas are also mentioned in Jain texts.

== Etymology ==
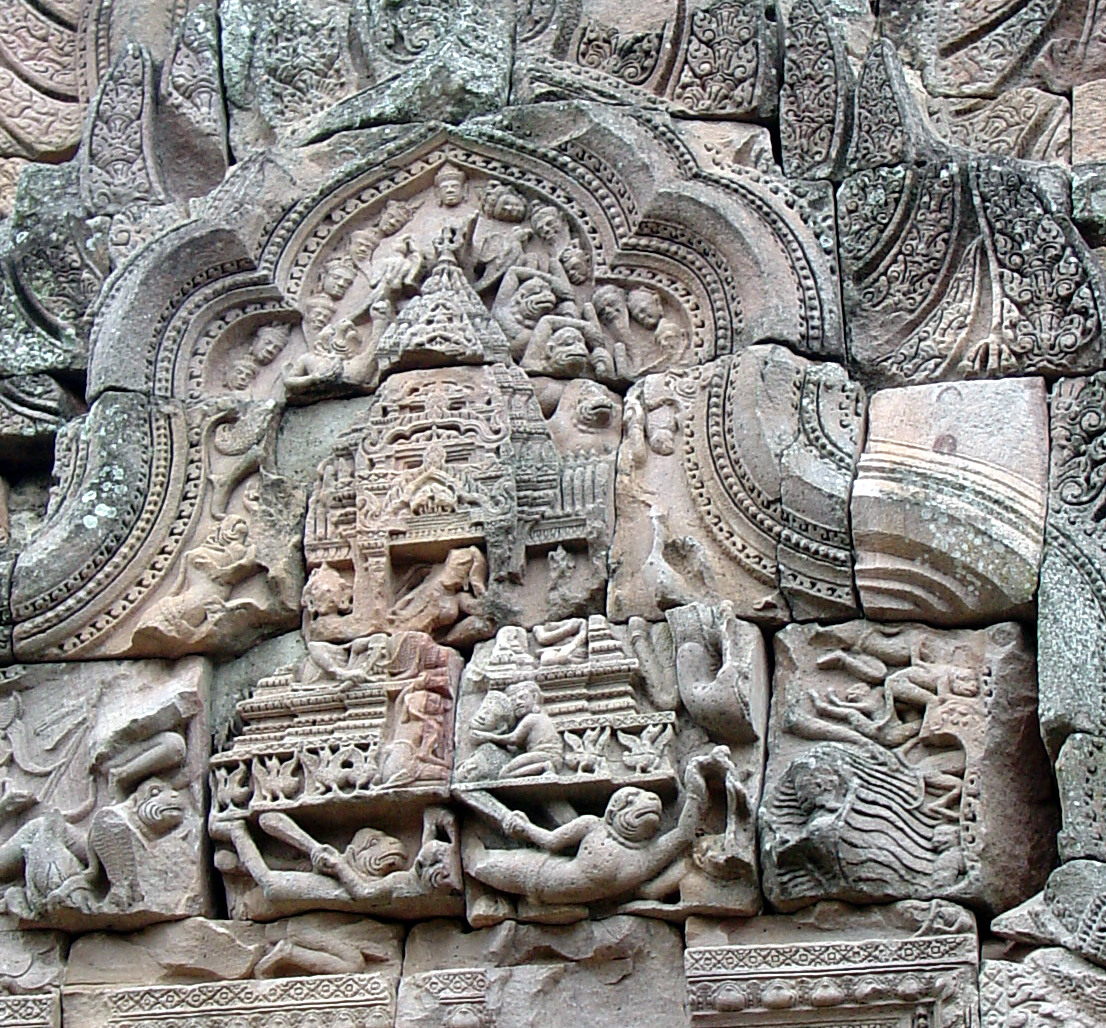
Sculpture of the Pushpaka vimana, as a temple flying in the sky

The Sanskrit word vimāna (विमान) literally means "measuring out, traversing" or "having been measured out". Monier Monier-Williams defines vimāna as "a car or a chariot of the gods, any self-moving aerial car sometimes serving as a seat or throne, sometimes self-moving and carrying its occupant through the air; other descriptions make the vimana more like a house or palace, and one kind is said to be seven stories high", and quotes the Pushpaka Vimana of Ravana as an example. It may denote any car or vehicle, especially a bier or a ship as well as a palace of an emperor, especially with seven stories. Nowadays, vimāna, vimān or bimān means "aircraft" in Indian languages, for example, the Bangladesh Biman (national flag carrier of Bangladesh) and in the town names Vimanapura (a suburb of Bangalore) and Vimannagar (a town in Pune). In another context, vimana is a feature in Hindu temple architecture.

== Hindu epics ==
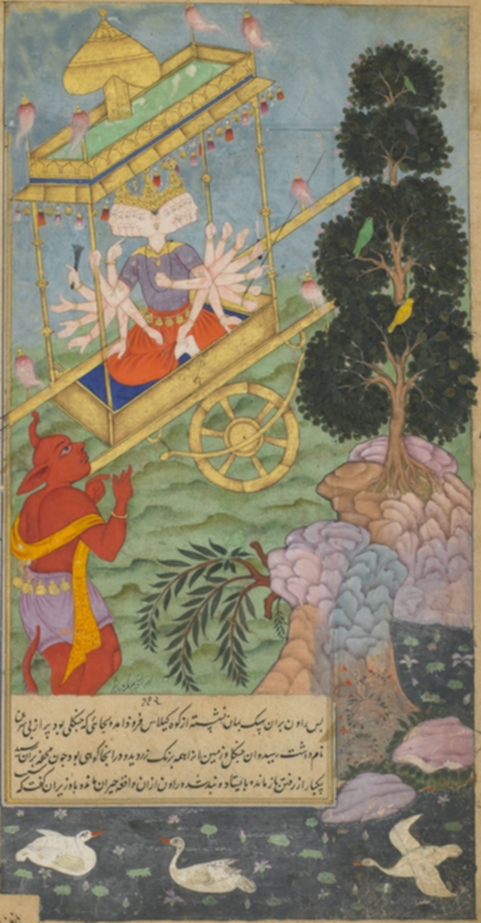
Ravana rides his Vimana, Pushpaka.

=== Ramayana ===
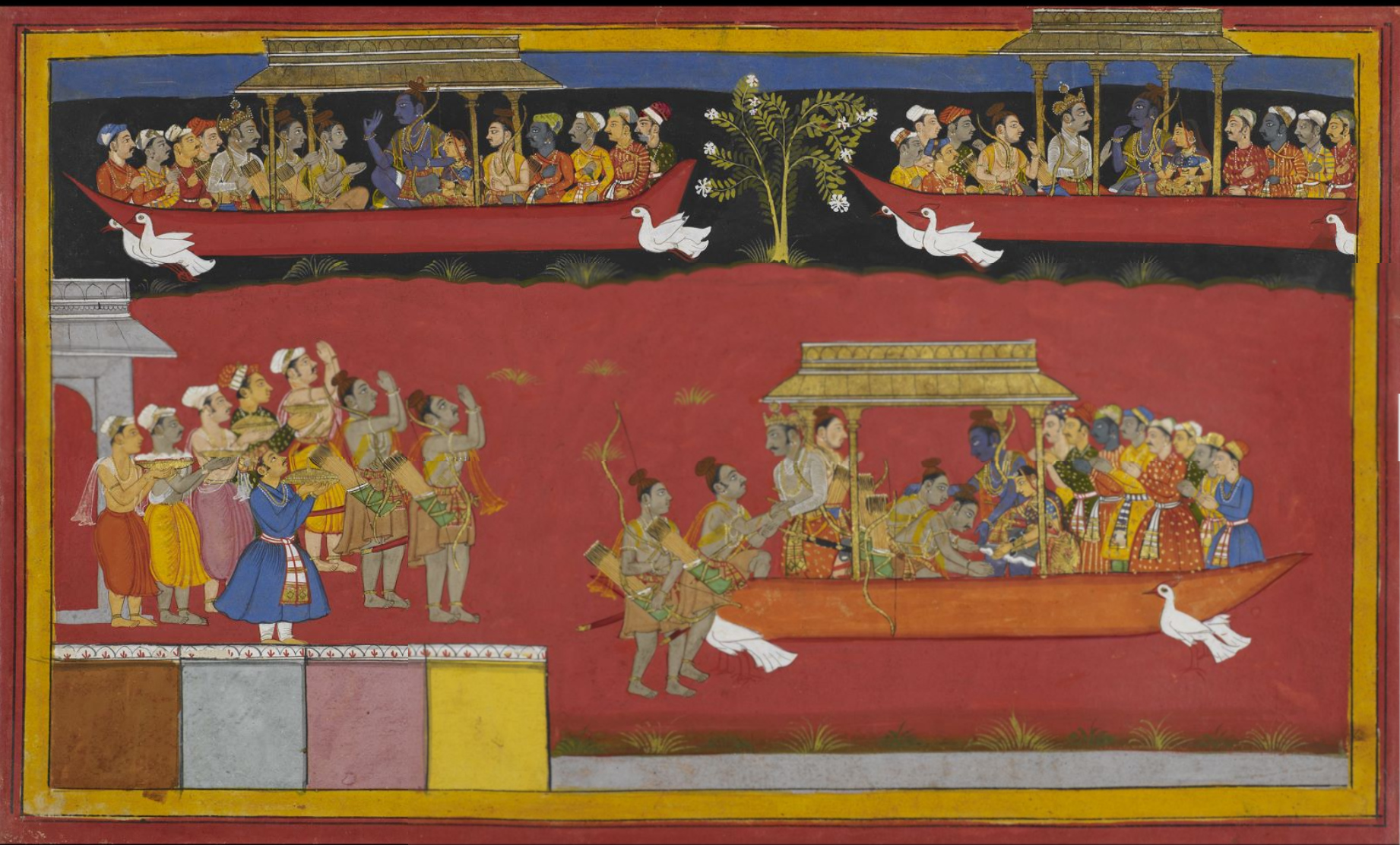
Pushpaka vimana depicted three times, twice flying in the sky and once landed on the ground.

In the Ramayana, the pushpaka ("flowery") vimana of Ravana is described as follows:

The Pushpaka Vimana that resembles the Sun and belongs to my brother was brought by the powerful Ravana; that aerial and excellent Vimana going everywhere at will ... that chariot resembling a bright cloud in the sky ... and the King [Rama] got in, and the excellent chariot at the command of the Raghira, rose up into the higher atmosphere.

It is the first flying vimana mentioned in existing Hindu texts (as distinct from the gods' flying horse-drawn chariots). Pushpaka was originally made by Vishvakarma for Brahma, the Hindu god of creation; later Brahma gave it to Kubera, the God of wealth; but it was later stolen, along with Lanka, by his half-brother, king Ravana.

Valmiki Ramayana describes it was being "yoked with mule-like horses" (3–31–34) which are described as "ghost-faced mules" (3–42–7 and 3–51–15).

=== Mahabharata ===
The title of Uparichara was received by a king named Vasu after a vimana was granted to him by Indra, who was pleased with him. This chariot enabled him to wander (chara) above (upari) all mortals. The vimana appeared as a crystalline entity in the sky.

महाभारतम् आदिपर्व ६४

दैवोपभोग्यं दिव्यं त्वामाकाशे स्फाटिकं महत्। आकाशगं त्वां मद्दत्तं विमानमुपपत्स्यते॥१३॥
त्वमेकः सर्वमर्त्येषु विमानवरमास्थितः। चरिष्यस्युपरिस्थो हि देवो विग्रहवानिव॥१४॥

— Mahabharata
Translation:
Mahabharata – Volume 1 – Adi Parva – 064

The celestial chariot, enjoyable to the deities and beautifully crystalline in the sky, that I have graciously bestowed upon you will come to you.(13)
You alone, on the splendid chariot, residing above all mortals, will wander above, like the embodiment of the divine.(14)

== Jain literature ==
Vimāna-vāsin ('dweller in vimāna') is a class of deities who served the tīrthaṃkara Mahā-vīra. These Vaimānika deities dwell in the Ūrdhva Loka heavens. According to the Kalpa Sūtra of Bhadra-bāhu, the 24th tīrthaṃkara Mahā-vīra himself emerged from the great vimāna Puṣpa-uttara; whereas the 22nd tīrthaṃkara Ariṣṭa-nemi emerged from the great vimāna Aparijita. The tīrthaṃkara-s Abhinandana (4th) and Sumati-nātha (5th) both travelled through the sky in the "Jayanta-vimāna", namely the great vimāna Sarva-artha-siddhi, which was owned by the Jayanta deities; whereas the tīrthaṃkara Dharma-nātha (15th) travelled through the sky in the "Vijaya-vimāna". A vimāna may be seen in a dream, such as the nalinī-gulma.

== Ashoka Edict IV ==
Ashoka mentions a model vimana ("aerial chariot") as part of the festivities or procession which were organised during his reign.

In times past, for many hundreds of years, there had ever been promoted the killing of animals and the hurting of living beings, discourtesy to relatives, (and) discourtesy to Sramanas and Brahmanas. But now, in consequence of the practice of morality on the part of king Devanampriya Priyadarsin, the sound of drums has become the sound of morality, showing the people representations of aerial chariots, elephants, masses of fire, and other divine figures.

— Ashoka, Major rock Edict no IV

== Samarangana Sutradhara ==
Chapter 31 of Samarangana Sutradhara, an 11th-century treatise on architecture, discusses machinery and automata, discussing their operation in terms of the four elements and aether, but suggesting that mercury may be an element in its own right. The author says he has personally seen most of the devices he describes in use, but does not specify which ones. The list includes two wooden aircraft, referred to as "vimanas": a "light" one shaped like a huge bird and a "heavy" one shaped like a temple. Both types contain a fire chamber which heats a container of mercury, somehow causing the aircraft to rise from the ground. However, the description is purposely left incomplete for ethical reasons:

The construction of the machines has not been explained
For the sake of secrecy, and not due to lack of knowledge.
In that respect, that should be known as the reason—
They are not fruitful when disclosed

== Vaimānika Shāstra ==
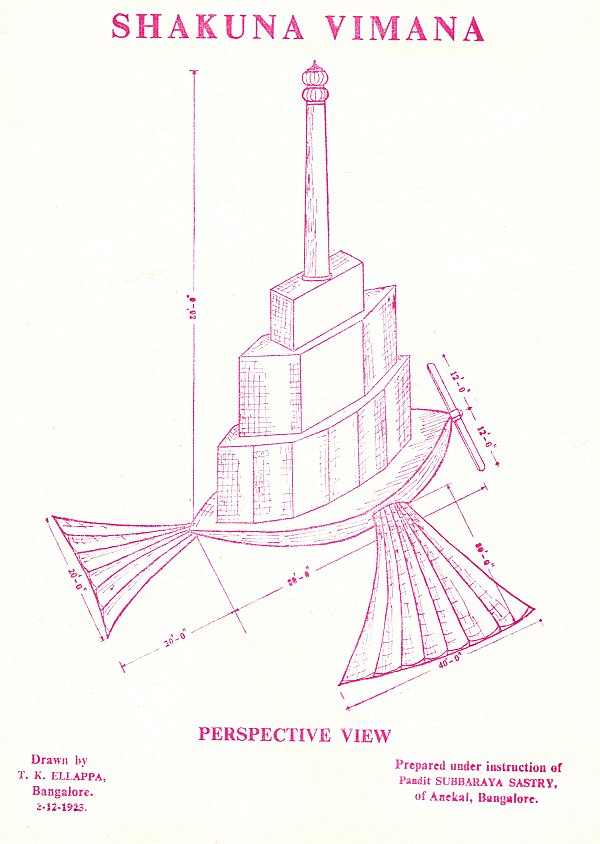
An illustration of the Shakuna Vimana that is supposed to fly like a bird with hinged wings and tail

The Vaimānika Shāstra is an early 20th-century Sanskrit text on aeronautics, obtained allegedly by mental channeling, about the construction of vimānas, the "chariots of the Gods". The existence of the text was revealed in 1952 by G. R. Josyer, according to whom it was written by one Pandit Subbaraya Shastry, who dictated it in 1918–1923. A Hindi translation was published in 1959, the Sanskrit text with an English translation in 1973. It has 3000 shlokas in eight chapters. Subbaraya Shastry allegedly stated that the content was dictated to him by Maharishi Bharadvaja. A study by aeronautical and mechanical engineering at Indian Institute of Science, Bangalore in 1974 concluded that the aircraft described in the text were "poor concoctions" and that the author showed a complete lack of understanding of aeronautics.

== Ayyavazhi ==
Pushpak Vimana, meaning "an aeroplane with flowers", is a mythical aeroplane found in Ayyavazhi mythology. Akilattirattu Ammanai, the religious book of Ayyavazhi, says that the Pushpak Vimana was sent to carry Ayya Vaikundar to Vaikundam.

A similar reference is found in regard to Saint Tukaram, Maharashtra, India. Lord Vishnu was so impressed by the devotion and singing of Tukaram that when his time came, a Pushpak viman (a heavenly aircraft shaped as an eagle) came to take him to heaven. Though it is believed that every other human being can go to heaven only without the body, Tukaram went to heaven with the body (Sadeha Swarga Prapti).

== In popular culture ==
Vimanas have appeared in books, films, games, on the Internet, etc., including:

- Biman is the name of national airline of Bangladesh, its name derived from Sanskrit Vimāna.
- Vimana is an arcade game from Toaplan wherein the player's ship earns the name.

== See also ==
- Early flying machines
- Laputa
- Merkabah mysticism
- Quimbaya artifacts
- Ratha
- Solar chariot
- Vaimanika Shastra
- Vimanavatthu
