= Hindutva pseudohistory =

Hindutva approach to historiography

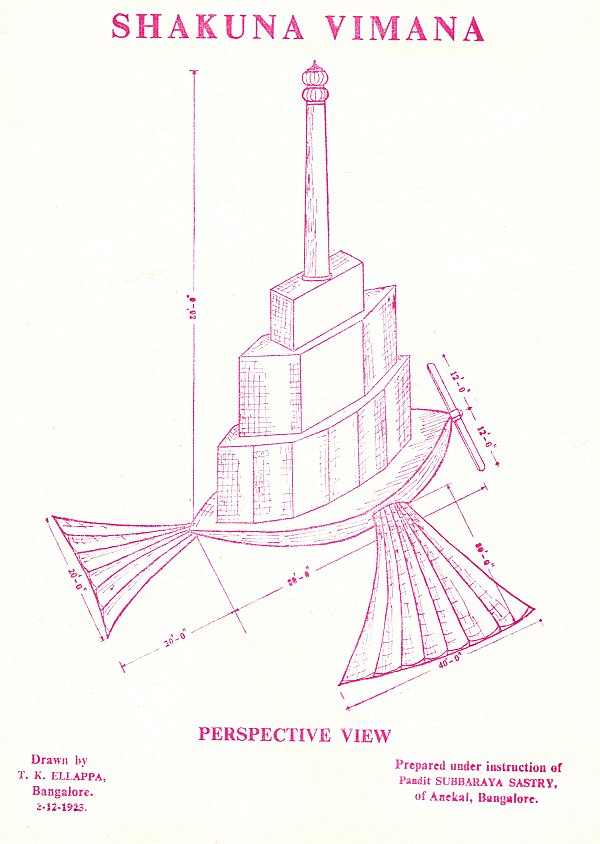
An illustration of the Shakuna Vimana, a flying aircraft that Hindu pseudohistorians say was described in the Vedas.

Hindutva pseudohistory is a series of false claims and disinformation spread by Hindu nationalist ideologues. The phenomenon has existed since the Hindutva movement - a right-wing political ideology that seeks to define the cultural identity of India in terms of Hinduism - began in the 1920s, although specific claims may be newer.

== History of Hindutva pseudohistory ==
Hindutva pseudohistory dates to the British colonial period and arose with the Hindutva movement itself. According to Anthony Parel, Vinayak Damodar Savarkar and his 1923 work Essentials of Hindutva regarded as the fundamental text of Hindutva ideology, presents the "Hindu culture as a self-sufficient culture, not needing any input from other cultures", which is "an unhistorical, narcissistic and false account of India's past". According to Jaffrelot, the Hindutva ideology projects its roots into an era in which the fiction in ancient Indian mythology and Vedic antiquity was presumed to be valid. This fiction was used to "give sustenance to Hindu ethnic consciousness".

In post-independence India, Hindutva organisations have continued to push pseudohistory. Writing in 1976, V. S. Naipaul was appalled by “the prickly vanity of many Hindus who asserted that their holy scriptures already contained the discoveries and inventions of Western science." Hindutva pseudohistory became stronger as Hindu nationalists gained political control in India, although their claims largely stayed the same. In recent years, scholars and journalists have called attention to Hindutva organisations that treat events in Hindu mythology as history. Hindutva organisations have been criticized for their belief in statements or practices that they claim to be both scientific and factual but are incompatible with the scientific method.

Hindutva pseudohistory has thrived in India during Narendra Modi's time as Prime Minister. Writing for the New York Times, Romila Thapar states that Modi's government and the BJP have "peddled myths and stereotypes", such as the insistence on "a single uniform culture of the Aryans, ancestral to the Hindu, as having prevailed in the subcontinent, subsuming all others", despite the scholarly evidence for migrations into India, which is "anathema to the Hindutva construction of early history". An investigative report by Reuters, based on testimonials from scholars, including Mahesh Sharma, the creator of the committee, claimed that the Modi government had established a committee of scholars to promote certain narratives, such as linking evidence of Indian history with ancient scriptures, establishing a view that Indian civilization is older than currently believed, proving the existence of the mystical Saraswati river, mapping and excavating sites of battles mentioned in the Mahabharata. Sharma also stated that his ministry had organised workshops and seminars to "to prove the supremacy of our glorious past."

== Examples ==
=== Falsification of Indus Horse Seal ===
Hindu nationalists have fabricated evidence with regards to Indus seals. Most overtly, in July 1999, N.S. Rajaram and Natwar Jha claimed to have found an Indus seal that showed a horse, which they argued would give evidence for equating the Indus valley civilisation with the Vedic culture in order to propagate the discredited Out of India Theory (OIT) which claims that Aryans originated in India and spread out to the rest of the world. Within weeks, Michael Witzel and Steven Farmer showed the seal to have been a fraud and a hoax perpetrated by Rajaram and Jha. According to Tony Joseph, OIT lacks support from even "a single, peer-reviewed scientific paper" and that it is nothing "more than a kind of clever and angry retort."

=== Censorship on caste and Hinduism ===
Hindu nationalists in the U.S. have attempted to censor historical references to Hindu practices such as the caste system and untouchability from history textbooks. One example is the California textbook controversy over Hindu history. In India, they have also attempted to erase references to caste in school textbooks by removing references to Dalit writers and Adivasi-led social movements. Hindutva ideologues have also tried to minimize references to Muslim figures, such as Akbar, and secular figures, such as Nehru in Indian textbooks. Often, they try to replacing them with icons such as Shivaji whom they falsely imagine "to have been seeking to establish a Hindu Rashtra in premodernity" in textbooks and in public statues. Truschke concludes that Hindutva efforts at altering history textbooks have been successful in the US and India and with their attempts at subverting academic views to political narratives, they have succeeded in limiting dialogue on Indian history.

=== Hindu indigeneity ===
Hindutva ideologues promote a misleading view that Hindus alone are indigenous to India and therefore Hindu as a social group can be considered as the definition of Indian, in an attempt to exclude groups such as Muslims from said definition. Scholars state that Narendra Modi, a Hindu nationalist, claims that Islamic rule of India was “1,200 years of slavery". Hindu nationalist websites also propagate a narrative about a “Hindu Holocaust” perpetuated by Muslim rulers. French journalist and Hindutva ally, François Gautier, has proposed the idea of a "Hindu Holocaust Museum"'.

In order to promote false version of history that glorifies Indian past and sidelines Muslims, the Hindu nationalists tend to reject Indo-Aryan migration which is backed with genetic, archeologist and linguistic evidence.

=== Hindus during partition ===
According to Tanika Sarkar, Hindutva narratives portray Hindus as the sole victims of violence during the partition of India, despite both sides being "equally combative". These narratives also depict Indian Muslims as "perpetual aggressors, invaders, and agents of terror", despite their significant "social, educational, and economic disadvantages" after losing electoral power following the partition.

=== Ancient aircraft ===
Shivkar Bapuji Talpade was an Indian instructor who has been claimed to have flown a heavier-than-air aircraft in 1895, before the first successful flight by the Wright brothers. The contemporary evidence about a successful flight does not exist and no reliable sources report this account. The pseudo-historical narrative about Talpade was propagated in the early 2000s by the Hindu-nationalists, who claimed that Talpade had "invented the modern aircraft".

=== Rama's Bridge to Lanka ===
Hindutva pseudohistorians identify stone formations in the channel between Sri Lanka and India as the bridge that an army of sentient monkeys built for Rama, an incarnation of Vishnu, in the Ramayana. The proposed identification prompted protests in 2007 and public clarifications from NASA about an aerial photo that partly sparked the confusion.

=== False claims of Muslim-led Hindu genocides ===
Since the 20th century, Hindu nationalists have falsely claimed that Muslims committed a series of genocides in South Asia, with a death toll of 45 million-80 million Hindus. They cite Hindu nationalist author K. S. Lal for this figure. Lal had himself noted that he "claim no finality about my assessments of demographic quantification." Scholars have explained, there is no historical evidence for these claims of genocides. Sanjay Subrahmanyam calls them "genocide invention," which he compares to "genocide denial" since they are "equally a radical falsification of the historical record" that "trivialize the great genocides of our times."

== Promotion ==
The BJP government has taken the initiative to "saffronise" history textbooks ever since taking power through exclusion of Muslim rulers and their contributions from Indian history. This is part of a larger effort to promote and reshape Hindutva, often leading to actions that sideline minorities. Examples include changing the names of places to Hindu ones and attempting to claim centuries-old mosques as Hindu religious sites.

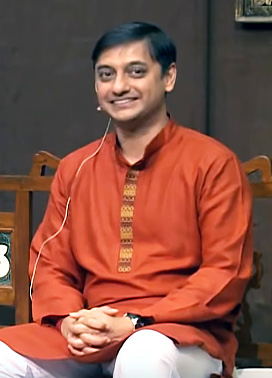
Sanjeev Sanyal, a popular historian who publishes books with elements of Hindutva revisionism

Hindutva objections to Indian textbooks first surfaced in the 1990s, although a smattering of earlier objections arose as early as the mid-1970s. According to The Print, the All India Council for Technical Education (AICTE) has revised the engineering curriculum to introduce an Indian Knowledge Systems (IKS) course textbook which makes claims about ancient Indians pioneering aviation and credits the Vedic period for inventing batteries, electricity production, maritime engineering and discovering the phenomenon of gravity based on certain interpretations of Hindu scriptures such as the Vedas. Critics such as Jaheer Mukthar, an assistant professor of economics at Kristu Jayanti College in Bangalore, have stated that "One can say that the government is clearly using the textbook as a tool for propagating the Hindutva agenda"

=== Promotion in NCERT textbooks ===
Distortion of history in National Council of Education Research and Training (NCERT) textbooks has been frequently observed under the BJP governments. G. N. Devy writes, "the discipline of history is so rich now in its knowledge of the past that Hindutva’s speculative historiography, though imposed upon learners through the NCERT, can hardly make a dent in it."

Popular historians ex-minister Sanjeev Sanyal and Vikram Sampath have written books promoting revisionist Hindutva history. The former generation of Hindu nationalist revisionists include Sita Ram Goel and Kishori Saran Lal.

The Archaeological Survey of India has also been accused of "fortif[ying] Hindutva history" by producing hurried reports that promote ahistorical views.

== Academic reception ==
Scholars reject Hindutva pseudohistory, often calling attention to its factual inaccuracies and lack of rigor. Romila Thapar has been especially outspoken on this issue and wrote in 2026 that scholars cannot seriously engage with Hindutva "junk history" because "it does not use a historical method of inquiry. Nor does it test the reliability of whatever it uses as sources, nor make any critical inquiry, nor base its interpretation on logical and reasoned causal connections." Thapar's view is supported professional historians in India and abroad.

== See also ==
- NCERT textbook controversies
- 2015 Indian Science Congress ancient aircraft controversy
- Vedic creationism (otherwise known as Hindu creationism)
- Epic-Puranic chronology § Historicity
