= Vikram Sampath =

Indian biographer and popular historian

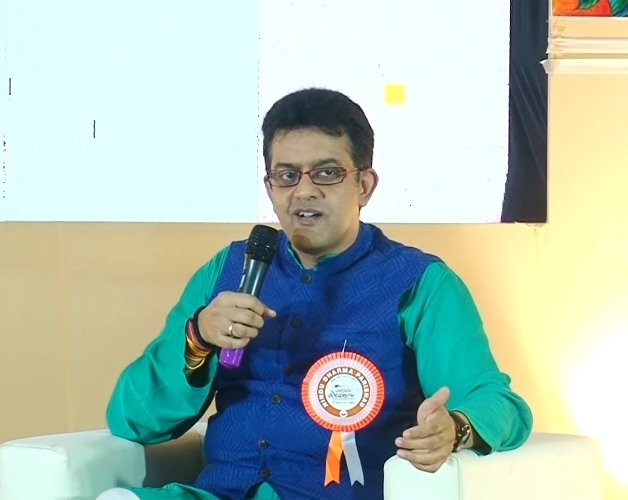
- Sampath in 2022
- Born: Bangalore, Karnataka, India
- Education: BITS Pilani (BE Electrical, MSc Mathematics); SP Jain (MBA); University of Queensland (PhD Ethnomusicology and History)
- Occupations: Popular historian, columnist, former financial analyst
- Notable work: Savarkar
- Awards: Sahitya Akademi Yuva Puraskar 2011

Vikram Sampath is an Indian popular historian, columnist, and biographer. His work is considered Hindutva revisionist history by professional scholars.

Sampath started his career in finance. He published a history of the Wadiyar Dynasty of Mysore in 2008, and a biography of Gauhar Jaan in 2012. In 2013, Sampath left his job at Hewlett-Packard to obtain a PhD in ethnomusicology and history at the University of Queensland, Australia. He wrote a two-part biography of V. D. Savarkar that received praise for its thorough detail but was criticised for its uncritical treatment of the subject. In September 2021, Sampath was selected as a Fellow of the Royal Historical Society.

In 2022, some academics accused Sampath of plagiarism, providing examples of near-identical reproduction of other authors' works in his corpus. Sampath denied the allegations and initiated a lawsuit.

== Early life and education ==
Vikram Sampath's father Sampath Srinivasan was a Tamil banker; his mother Nagamani Sampath was a Marathi housewife. He was raised in Bangalore, and completed his schooling at Sri Aurobindo Memorial School and Bishop Cotton Boys' School.

Sampath was trained in Carnatic music since the age of five; among his teachers were Jayanthi Kumaresh and Bombay Jayashri. Sampath graduated from Birla Institute of Technology and Science, Pilani (BITS Pilani) with a dual degree in electronics engineering and a master's degree in mathematics. Against the wishes of his professors, who wanted Sampath to pursue a PhD in topology, he shifted to finance and obtained an MBA from S. P. Jain Institute of Management and Research. In October 2017, Sampath received a doctorate in ethnomusicology and history from the School of Music at University of Queensland, Australia. (Note: The thesis is titled "Indian classical music and the gramophone (c. 1900-1930): A socio-cultural, historical, and musical analysis of the Gramophone Company's Indian recording expeditions".)

== Career ==
Sampath worked at GE Capital in Gurgaon for about eight months until December 2005, then switched to Citibank's Global Decision Management Team at Bangalore, where he worked until March 2008. He went on to join Hewlett-Packard, where he stayed until July 2013.

Sampath co-founded the Bangalore Lit Fest in 2012 and became its director. In 2015, he resigned from the post after invited authors began to pull out the festival owing to Sampath's critical comments on the 2015 Indian writers' protest. Sampath blamed the "tolerance mafia".

In February 2014, Sampath was appointed for a three-year tenure as the Executive Director of the Bangalore regional centre of Indira Gandhi National Centre for the Arts, from which he resigned in August 2015 due to "internal administrative differences".

In 2025, Sampath co-founded NAAV AI to use LLMs to translate English works into Indian languages.

== Works and reception ==
=== Wadiyar dynasty ===
Vikram Sampath's first book, a history of the Wadiyar dynasty of Mysore, was published in 2008 by Rupa Publications, a topic that had captivated him since reading the "humiliating portrayal" of Wadiyars in The Sword of Tipu Sultan, and a "television show's misrepresentation of a particular era of the dynasty" provided the impetus to explore the subject. Sampath was inspired by the works of Arun Shourie and Ramachandra Guha but said his work is not a "historian's point-of-view"; the lack of an academic training coupled with a disinclination to either Marxism or Hindu Nationalism benefitted him. Suryanath U. Kamath proof-read the work.

A review in The Hindu Literary Review noted the work to be unprecedented for the span of time it chronicles; the reviewer, however, said they found Sampath's "keenness on chronicling details rather than harnessing them for a rigorous academic engagement with forces that shape history" disappointing. His methodology—mundane documentation of all sides to a story absent any historical analysis—was criticised as were his "totally inane" observations. Pavitra Jayaraman's review in Mint found the work to be a "page-turner" that attests to the years of work Sampath had put in the project. Another review in the Business Standard found Sampath to have surpassed all other works produced on similar themes in a non-academic context; he made excellent use of the archives to draft a "riveting" narrative.

=== Gauhar Jaan ===
In 2012, Sampath published a biography of Gauhar Jaan, who was India's first classical musician to record on the gramophone. He had chanced upon Jaan in the Royal Archives of Mysore while researching for the previous book. (Note: Sampath spotted some letters from Jaan, addressed to the Mysore Government with pleas to not slash her salary.)

All reviewers commended Sampath's meticulous archival work despite the scarcity of sources on figures like Jaan. Ethnomusicologist Peter Manuel found Sampath to have had sketched an "informative and evocative portrait" of Jaan and her politico-cultural milieu despite a non-scholarly approach that lacks citations; his work was hailed as a groundbreaking contribution to studies of Hindustani music. Partha Chatterjee, reviewing for Frontline, found his portrayal of Jaan "an unusual and beautiful book".

Harbans Singh, reviewing for The Tribune, praised Sampath's non-judgmental scholarship and forceful recreation of the cultural world inhabited by Jaan. The Hindu Literary Review admired Sampath's nuanced chronicling of the dichotomies that arose with regimes of princely modernity. Sadanand Menon, reviewing for Outlook, found the book be filled with a "glut of [pedantic and tiresome] detail"; the work was held to be "at times tiresome, at others ingenuous in its amateurish attempts at reconstructing history".

The book has been translated into Hindi and Marathi. It has also been adapted into an eponymous play by Lillette Dubey and Mahesh Dattani. Ashutosh Gowarikar acquired film rights for the book in 2017.

==== Digital music archive ====
While working on the book, Sampath set up a private, non-profit trust in collaboration with Manipal University to digitise vintage gramophone recordings and make them freely accessible to the public, with funding from T. V. Mohandas Pai. In 2015, Sampath donated the collection to the Indira Gandhi National Centre for the Arts. Since 2013, much of the archive has been accessible for free on SoundCloud. As of 2021, the archive includes almost 15,000 records, 7,000 of which had been digitised.

=== S. Balachander ===
Sampath's third book, which was published in 2013, narrates the life of Veena maestro S. Balachander. Balachander was a controversial figure; Sampath received hate mail but he was extensively helped by Balachander's widow and family during his research. Overall, Sampath found Balachander to be a much-misunderstood and maligned genius.

T. M. Krishna found Sampath's work to be "engaging" and provides "a rare insight into one of the most enigmatic figures in Indian performing art". According to Krishna, "the author has tried to create a social and musical context for the reader, sometimes this intrudes into Balachander's story". Krishna also noted errors on the musical history of South India. A review in Frontline commended Sampath for situating a well-researched, detailed and objective biography of an enigmatic figure within the broader interplays of Carnatic music. The book has been translated into Tamil.

=== V. D. Savarkar ===
Sampath's fourth book is a biography of V. D. Savarkar that was published by Penguin Books in two parts in 2019 and 2021. The book was critiqued by several academics. In February 2022, three historians accused works by Sampath—including parts of his two-volume Savarkar biography—of plagiarism in a letter addressed to the president of the RHS following Sampath's election as a fellow of the RHS.

The series contains two books. The first book covers Savarkar’s life until 1924, including his years in London and imprisonment. The second book covers the later years of Savarkar, until 1966. It includes Savarkar's work with the Hindu Mahasabha and the Rashtriya Swayamsevak Sangh (RSS), his opposition to Gandhi’s non-violence, his implication and acquittal in Gandhi’s assassination and its overall impact on his contentious legacy.

Janaki Bakhle, an associate professor of Indian history at University of California, Berkeley who reviewed the volumes for India Today, noted despite meticulous and thorough research, Sampath's contribution is wholly uncritical, and he accepts every primary source at face value; Bakhle criticised Sampath's interpretation of concurrent historical events as non-objective and lacking in updates from relevant scholarship. Vikram Visana, a Lecturer in Political Theory at the University of Leicester criticises him for failing to put Savarkar's "rhetorical historywriting" that makes use of "epic heroism and myth-making" to incite "revolutionary violence" into context with his narrative. He also criticises him for taking Savarkar's allegations of abuse by Muslim prison wardens in Savarkar's My transportation for life at face value. Reviewing for Open, popular historian Manu S. Pillai voiced similar concerns; he praised Sampath's meticulous research and his persuasive case of Savarkar as a martyr who had sacrificed his youth for the cause of nation but criticised his methodologies, especially the uncritical acceptance of Savarkar's self-laudatory memoirs, and Sampath was held to be an unobjective biographer.

Madhav Khosla, professor of Political Science at Columbia Law School who reviewed the work for Hindustan Times, commended the detailed narrative but found Sampath's treatment of Savarkar's extremist views and his relationship with the British government less "thoughtful" when compared to another contemporary biography by Vaibhav Purandare. P. A. Krishnan, reviewing for Outlook, found the work to be an elaborate but sympathetic biography. Salil Tripathi, reviewing for Mint, found Sampath's choice of language and analyses to "give away" his obvious bias despite the façade of neutrality; particular attention was drawn to the cavalier descriptions of any massacre perpetrated by Muslims as "genocides".

In contrast, Swati Parashar, a professor at the University of Gothenburg who reviewed the volumes for The Hindu, called the comprehensive treatment of Savarkar a "must-read", admiring how he brought out "the contradictions, complexities and complicities" that made Savarkar. Reviewing for The Telegraph, TCA Raghavan described the book as "a straightforward, no-fuss narrative without hyperbole and hero worship".

=== Baul ===
In 2022, Sampath, composer Ricky Kej and scholar Rajib Sarma produced a documentary film titled Who is Baul about the mystical Baul tradition of Bengal; it was directed by Sairam Sagiraju.

=== Bravehearts of Bharat ===
Sampath's Bravehearts of Bharat: Vignettes from Indian History, published in 2022, is an anthology of 15 biographies of "under-appreciated civilisational warriors". Among those included were Lachit Barphukan, Chand Bibi, and Lalitaditya Muktapida. Shashi Warrier, reviewing the work for The Asian Age, praised the author's selection of figures from a millennia-long span cutting across religion, profession, and gender and found his narration commendable; however, he took issue with the word "civilization", and further found Sampath's presentation of Lalitaditya non-critical and unconvincing.

=== Waiting for Shiva: Unearthing the Truth of Kashi’s Gyan Vapi ===
Waiting for Shiva: Unearthing the Truth of Kashi’s Gyan Vapi was published in 2024 to analyse the Gyanvapi Mosque site in Varanasi. Sampath criticises historians for ignoring Hindu claims on the site and, at the book launch, endorsed attempts to build a temple on the mosque's current location.

=== Tipu Sultan: The Saga of Mysore's Interregnum (1760–1799) ===
In 2024, his new book Tipu Sultan: The Saga of Mysore's Interregnum (1760–1799) was released.

== Reception ==
=== Honors ===
For his book on Gauhar Jaan, Sampath was awarded the first Yuva Puraskar in English literature by Sahitya Akademi, India, and the Excellence in Historical Research Award by Association for Recorded Sound Collections. Sampath was also accorded with a visiting fellowship by Berlin Institute for Advanced Study. In September 2021, he was selected as a Fellow of the Royal Historical Society. (Note: Apart from historians in academia, members include "government historians, broadcasters, film-makers, creative writers, biographers, public historians, curators, publishers, journalists and editors, and academic librarians." They must have made an "original contribution to historical scholarship, typically through the authorship of a book, a body of scholarly work similar in scale and impact to a book, the organisation of exhibitions and conferences, the editing of journals, and other works of diffusion and dissemination grounded in historical research".)

=== Plagiarism Allegations ===
In a letter to the president of the Royal Historical Society dated 11 February 2022, Audrey Truschke, Rohit Chopra, (Note: Chopra is an Associate Professor in the Department of Communication at Santa Clara University. He has published on the intersections of Hindu nationalism and media.) and Ananya Chakravarti (Note: Chakravarti is an Associate Professor of History at Georgetown University. She has published on the histories of religion in South Asia.) accused Sampath of plagiarism and requested Sampath's membership be reviewed and his scholarship be thoroughly examined. The letter includes as examples sections from a 2017 article by Sampath published in India Foundation Journal, (Note: The article is: Sampath, Vikram (July–August 2017), "The Revolutionary Leader Vinayak Damodar Savarkar" (PDF), India Foundation Journal. It carries the footnote: "This paper was presented by Dr. Vikram Sampath at the national seminar on ‘Revisiting Indian Independence Movement’ organised by India Foundation at New Delhi on 18th March, 2017.") which lacked explicit attribution and were copied with minimal paraphrasing from works of Vinayak Chaturvedi and Janaki Bakhle. They also cited an example from his biography of Savarkar, in which a paragraph was nearly identical to one in an undergraduate student thesis. It was later supplemented with more examples of identical reproduction from the works of Chaturvedi and R.C. Majumdar. According to the letter, plagiarism detection software had found about 50% of the text in the 2017 publication was plagiarised. They also claimed to have come across other similar instances in Sampath's corpus of work.

Chaturvedi expressed his disappointment at the situation and encouraged people to read his article and Sampath's "side-by-side and judge for themselves"; Bakhle found the 2017 article by Sampath to have included portions of an earlier article by her without in-text citation, though her article was referenced in an incomplete manner in the bibliography. Bakhle suggested that "if such plagiarism is the unintentional result of shoddiness in writing and publication", then Sampath and India Foundation Journal should offer a public apology and retract the publication. Bakhle also said that she did not have comments on the allegations of plagiarism in Sampath's 2019 biography of Savarkar, which she had earlier reviewed for India Today in 2019. (Note: Bakhle's support came about a week after the publication of the accusations. Sampath had argued, including in his representation to the Delhi High Court, Bakhle had reviewed his biography of Savarkar without any adverse comments about plagiarism, and she thus did not share the concerns of the letter.)

Sampath rejected the allegations and filed a defamation suit in Delhi High Court seeking costs of ₹two crore (271,000 USD). He stated the 2017 publication is the transcript of a speech in which he had properly included appropriate attribution, and that the sources remain cited in the bibliography section. In response, the complaining authors said referencing a publication is not a free pass to reproduce content; None of the complainants except Chakravarti submitted to the jurisdiction of the Court. On the first hearing, an interim order was passed restraining Truschke and others from publishing the letter or any other defamatory material; a week later and again in May, the court ordered Twitter to remove multiple tweets to such effect Truschke had published despite the order.

=== Critics ===
Scholars have criticized Sampath's use of decolonization to promote Hindutva viewpoints. Akash Bhattacharya (Note: Faculty member at the School of Education at Azim Premji University) has cautioned that "right-wing Indian historians such as Vikram Sampath have used the language of decolonisation to make Hindu domination sound reasonable" by contrasting "Hinduism's ancient glory" with "the so-called trauma of 'Islamic conquest'." Bhattacharya says that Sampath simplistically equates "Islam's presence in India with the supposed Hindu trauma", which Bhattacharya finds "prejudiced and incorrect." Irfan Ahmad (Note: Sociologist at Ibn Haldun University in Istanbul, Turkey) identifies Sampath as promoting "Hindu Orientalism" through describing all Muslim rulers as barbarians.
