= P. A. Krishnan =

Indian politician

P. A. Krishnan is an Indian writer who writes in both Tamil and English. He began his career as a teacher of physics and went on to serve many years as a bureaucrat in the Government of India. After a long stint of 30 years, he joined a research organization as the CEO. He later became a Senior Director with a multinational firm.

His most famous novels include The Tiger Claw Tree and The Muddy River which were also re-created by him in Tamil as புலிநகக் கொன்றை and கலங்கிய நதி. He has also written an introduction to Western Painting the first volume of which was published by Kalachuvadu under the title மேற்கத்திய ஓவியங்கள். A contributor to several Indian newspapers and literary magazines, several volumes of his essays have also been collated and published, the most notable ones being Agrahaarathil Periyar (அக்கிரகாரத்தில் பெரியார்) and Thirumbichendra Tharunam (திரும்பிச் சென்ற தருணம்). He is one of the Advisories in awards panel of Tamil literary garden organization.

Krishnan presently lives with his wife Revathi in New Delhi and their only son Siddharth works in Google in California.

== Works ==
=== English ===
- The Tiger Claw Tree

The Tiger Claw Tree follows the vicissitudes of a Tenkalai Iyengar family in South India. At its center is the matriarch Ponna who is taking her last stand both against death and her failing memory. Her confused memories about long forgotten family anecdotes are both family history and impetus for events in the personal history of her children, grandchildren and great-grandchildren. The last of these are Kannan and Nambi who bring the story into the latter half of the last century and whose personal tragedies are set against the larger canvas of regional and national histories. Although an engaging family saga it rises above that genre by exploring the validity of ideas and their personal betrayal against the tragic backdrop of the nightmare that is History. The title is drawn from a A.K.Ramanujan translation of a famous Sangam poem from the anthology Ainkurunuru (Poem 142). Author adds a pithy coda to this little gem of a poem: "Each person has a tree within himself, to some the birds may not come at all."

- The Muddy river

Krishnan's second novel Muddy River drops the grand raconteurial ambition of narrating stories spanning a century and instead chooses to focus on one man's story against the backdrop of Indian bureaucracy and modern day politics. Drawn largely from his personal experience as an executive director of Vigilance in a public sector company, the novel follows Ramesh Chandran in his quest to rescue a kidnapped Engineer from the hands of Assamese Militants. The novel adopts a more complicated narrative strategy than Tiger Claw as it tracks in parallel the authorial ambitions of Ramesh Chandran as he attempts to weave his own life story that is part adventure, part bureaucratic nightmare and part personal tragedy into a complex novel. Self-referential and ambitious Muddy River attempts to blur the lines between fiction and reality, between narrator and the narration in the hope that these erasures will bring forth a more meaningful reality for its present and future readers.

=== Tamil ===
- Puli naga kondrai - Novel
- Kalangiya Nadhi - Novel
- Agrahaarathil Periyar - essays
- Thirumbichendra Tharunam - essays
- Merkathiya Oviyangal volume 1 Introduction to the Western Paintings
- Indiavum Ulagamum - First collection of essays that appeared in the Tamil Hindu
- Dublin Ezhuchi (translation) - The Dublin Uprising
- Enge Pokirom - Second collection of essays that appeared in the Tamil Hindu
- Merkathiya Oviyangal volume 2
- Azhiyath Thadangal (in print)
