= Quimbaya artifacts =

Golden objects made by the Quimbaya culture, dated around 1000 CE

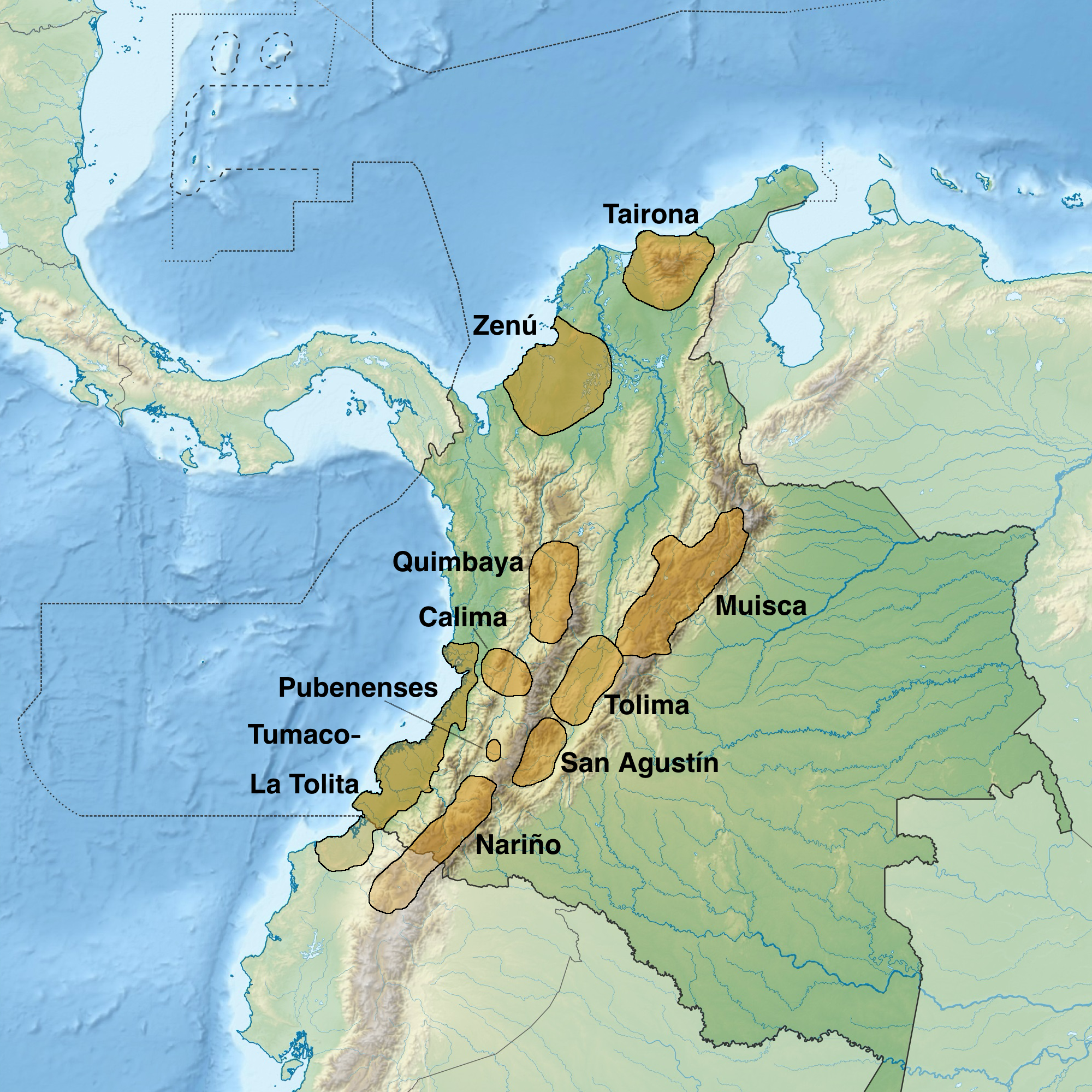
Map of pre-Columbian cultures

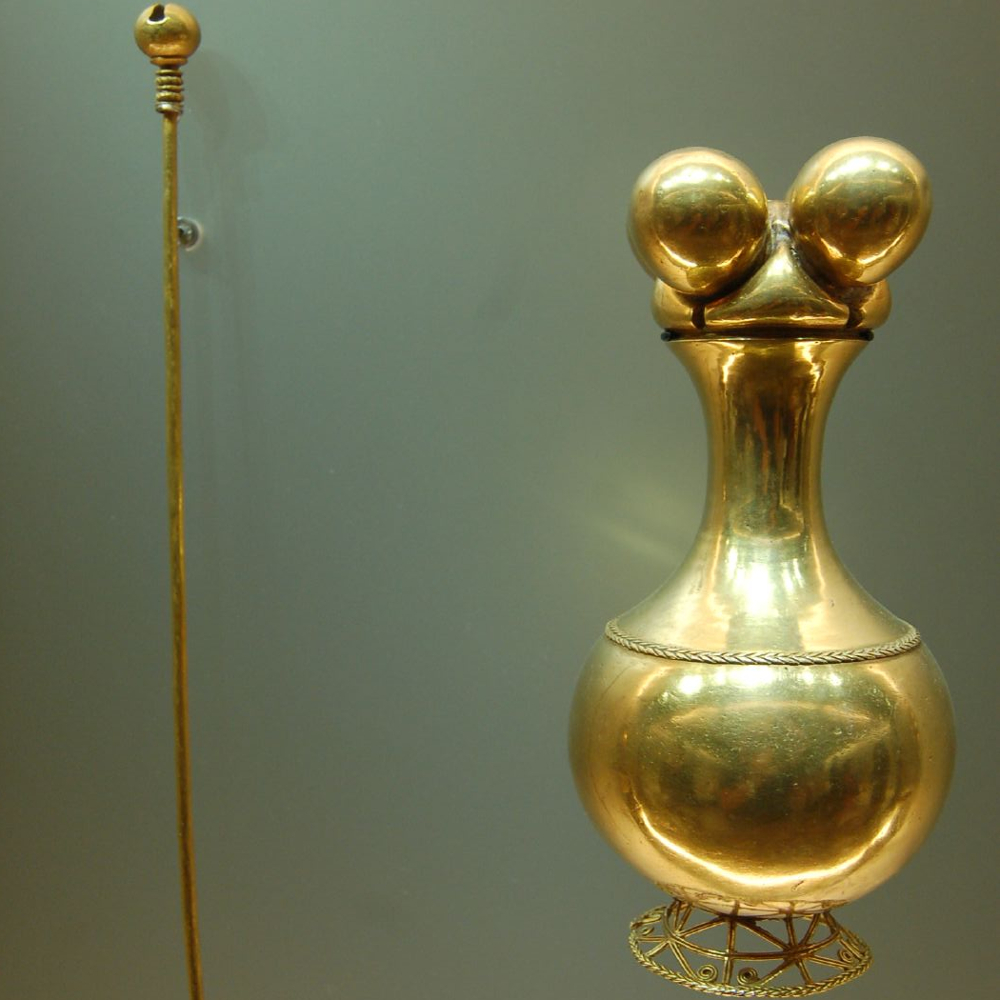
Poporo Quimbaya in the Gold Museum, Bogotá Colombia

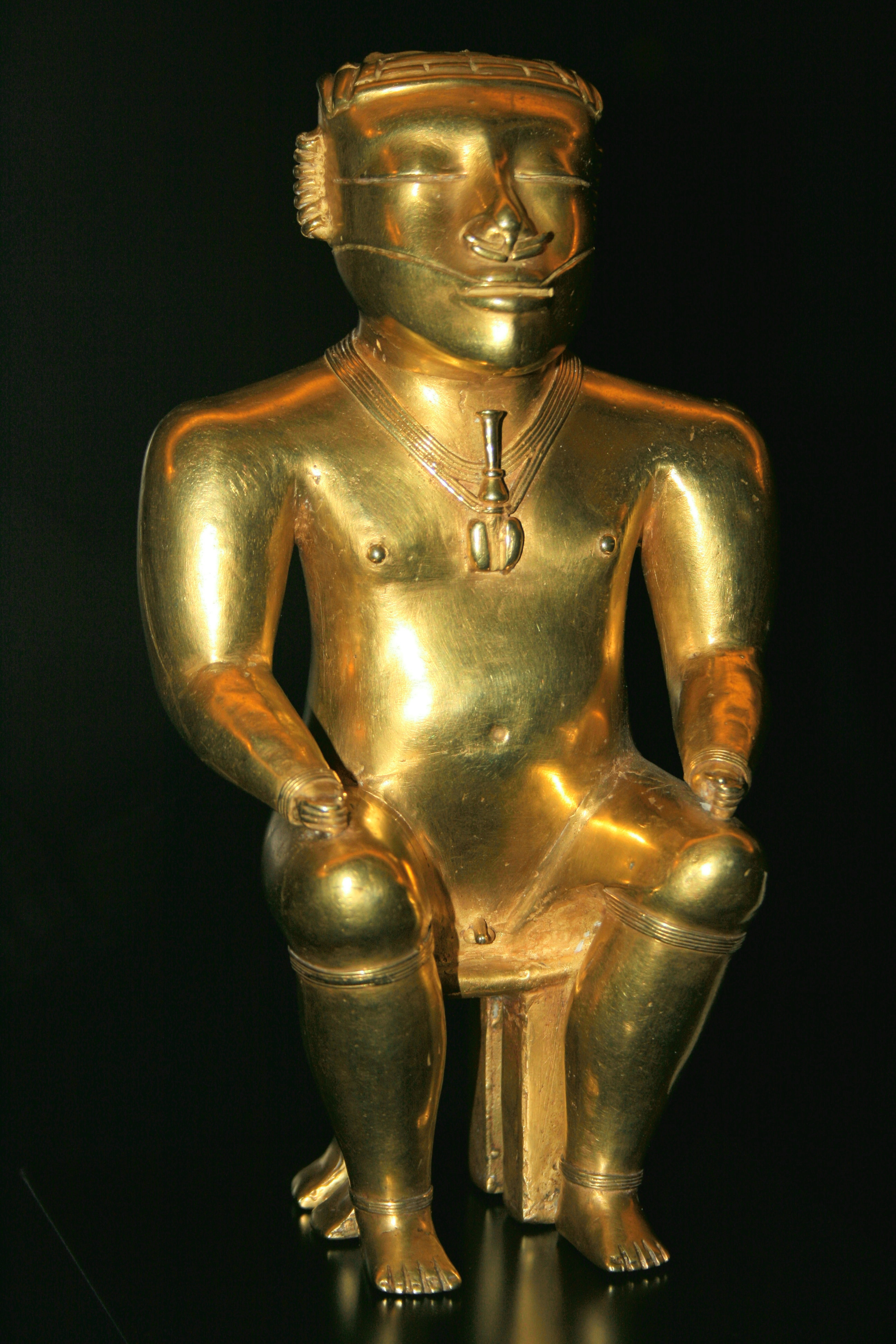
Seated gold figure from the Museo de América (Museum of America)

Quimbaya artifacts refer to a range of primarily ceramic and gold objects surviving from the Quimbaya civilisation, one of many pre-Columbian cultures of Colombia inhabiting the Middle Cauca River valley and southern Antioquian region of modern-day Colombia. The artifacts are believed to have originated during the Classical Quimbaya period 500 BC–600 AD.

== Artifact types ==
=== Poporos ===
Poporos are vessel type containers primarily used to store powdered lime, made from calcined seashells. They were often cast in gold, decorated with human figures and exhibited "great elegance of conception, manufacture, and finish."

The most noteworthy poporos artifact is the Poporo Quimbaya exhibited in the Gold Museum in Bogotá, Colombia. Cast using the lost wax technique in Tumbaga alloy around 300 CE, the 777 gram golden vessel was used as a ceremonial device for consuming lime while chewing coca leaves during religious ceremonies

=== Stylised human figures ===
These Quimbaya ceremonial artifacts include anthropomorphic or (often male) human figure objects, often seated, approximately 10-50cm in height, made as cinerary urns cast in gold, or clay slab ceramics. Several examples can be found in the Metropolitan Museum of Art, New York collection. The stylised figures were often designed portraying a social class and included as offerings in burials in tombs representing the guardians or companions for the deceased. Representative of a distinctive Quimbaya style they have been described as "serenely smiling human beings in a variety of quiescent poses".

=== Animal and plant figures ===
These include a range of phytomorphic and zoomorphic representations. The most common figures bring birds, insects, fish and bats. Measuring approximately 5 to 7.5cm in length, there are over 100 of these relics on display in the Museo del Oro (Gold Museum) in Bogotá, Colombia.

=== Pendants and ornaments ===
Artifacts include necklace beads, stylised figure pendants, nose and ear and other personal body ornaments. Other larger ornaments were used for household and decorative tomb and funeral elements which have been identified as key elements of Quimbaya cultural traditions.

=== Other artifacts ===
A range of other important cultural objects including bowls, jars, bottles and other vessels, musical instruments and bells, have been retrieved from archaeological excavations, as well as helmets and other objects of warfare.

In addition to ceremonial figurines and containers, a range of other vessels and ornaments were used as burial offerings. Tomb artifacts also include funeral masks and sarcophagi, suggesting the central importance of burial rituals and particularly the use of gold as a sacred metal to elevate spiritual preparations for the afterlife.

== The Quimbaya Treasure ==
The most notable collection of Quimbaya artifacts is the Quimbaya Treasure, which consists of 433 artifacts originally discovered in 1890 in Quindio, Colombia. The artifacts of the Quimbaya Treasure include poporos and other ceremonial vessels, containers, figures, crowns, pendants, necklace beads and pins, bells, musical instruments, nose and ear ornaments.

A large part of the original collection was purchased from grave looters in 1891 by then President of the Republic, Carlos Holguín as a gift to Queen Governor of Spain, María Cristina de Habsburgo. These 122 artifacts, mainly gold and funeral, were eventually displayed at the Museo de América in Madrid, Spain where they reside. They are yet to be returned to Colombia despite a judgment issued on 19 October 2017 by the Colombian Constitutional Court ordering the restitution of the objects of the Quimbaya people under international laws and treaties concerning the cultural property of indigenous peoples.

== Materials and technology ==
=== Gold-works ===
Gold-works are the predominant material composition and finish type for known Quimbaya artifacts, used extensively across categories, including the range of artistically stylised figure representations of birds, fish, mammals and reptiles of the region. Gold-work features in poporos and cinerary urns in the shape of high ranking social figures.

A large amount of the Quimbaya Treasure consists of gold-work decorative personal items such as golden nose rings, necklaces, ear spacers, bracelets and pendants. These items are indicative of the collection's origins, being a large funerary deposit that was later looted.

=== Tumbaga ===
Much of the Quimbaya artifacts were created from a combination of pure gold, but also the gold-copper alloy, Tumbaga. This alloy gave the gold-works a reddish hue within the final product and allowed further malleability post the casting process. Much of the gold and Tumbaga works of the Quimbaya are believed to have been cast with the lost wax technique, a form of casting that has been found throughout ancient civilisations as early as 4000 BCE.

=== Ceramics ===
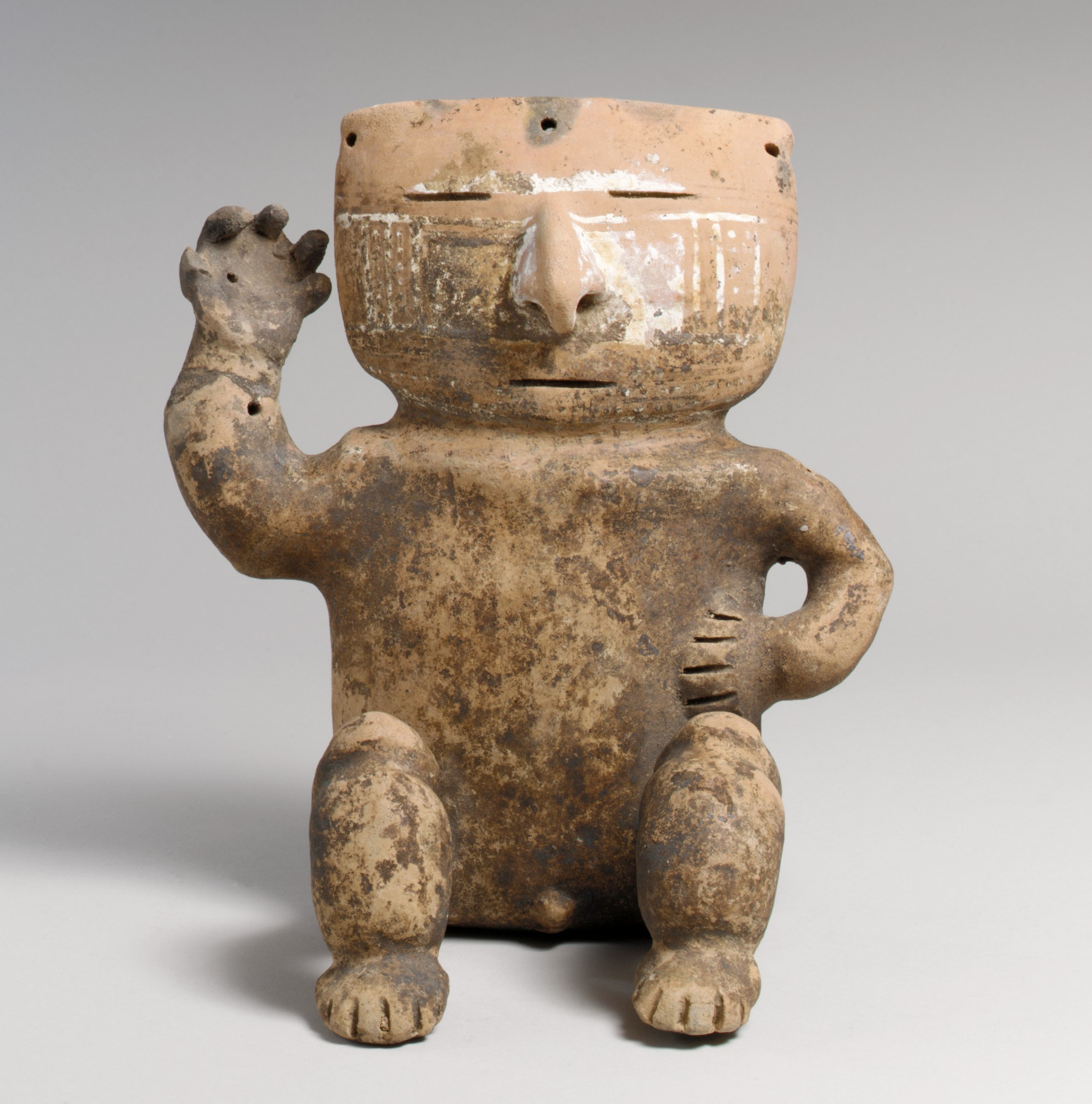
Seated ceramic figure, at the Metropolitan Museum of Art New York

The majority of recovered Quimbaya ceramic artifacts consist of decorated jars and vessels with anthropomorphic features. Additionally there were many ceramic figures portraying particular social classes or individuals.

Numerous ceramic spindle whorls have also been found amongst the Quimbaya treasure, alluding to the large importance of textile production within the culture so much so it is buried alongside individuals within funerary customs.

=== Regional artisan cultures ===
Significant regional artifact types exist from across comparable pre-Columbian cultures. These demonstrate significant artisan diversity in typology of mediums and materials.

The Quimbaya goldsmiths, pottery and ceramic craftspeople were contemporary to rich and distinctive artisan traditions present in neighbouring cultures including the San Agustin, Tierradentro, Tumaco, Zenú, and Narino cultures.

Even prior to Quimbaya goldsmith prevalence, metal objects played a role in social and class differentiation in the region, signifying the special status of certain individuals and groups in pre-Columbian cultures.

== Artifact controversies ==
The comprehensive archaeological record of unique cultural elements of Quimbaya culture has potentially been compromised by the high probability of many artifacts being well-crafted copies, or entirely new pieces redistributed to museums and private collections under the guise of scientific authenticity. This has also led to some stereotyping of artifact evidence. Critical observations have been made that the term "Quimbaya" has become disassociated from unique cultural elements through intensive artifact trading history, becoming almost a hyperbolic description of the exotic and mysterious artifacts found across the broader central Colombian region.

=== Forgery ===
The expansive boom in South American artifact trade similarly gave rise to an increase in pseudo artifact production. Many of the original artifacts were chimeras of rearranged or reshaped fragments into further complex and aesthetically provoking designs in hopes to sell better along with the fabrication of entirely new fake artifacts that were created in the modern era to resemble those of the past.

Partially-faked artifacts are a major concern where heavy restoration makes it difficult to identify fakes. Many genuine artifacts are recovered in a poor state of preservation or have missing elements indicating low intrinsic market value. Restoration and additions can bring old pieces back to life and enable them to command higher prices.

=== Guaquéros ===
Guaquéros (also Huaqueoro) is the term used in Colombia and broader South America for an individual who loots graves or tombs for their profession. This occupation was widespread and accepted within the early 19th century where a legal framework was in order that applied ownership to those who discovered the artifacts. This legal framework was in place up until the early 20th century when new laws enforced state ownership and therefore a protectionist legal system.

The Guaquéros artifact trade was heavily exacerbated by the increase in exotic artifact demand internationally. This created a further spread of misinformation through the mislabeling of artifact origin as a guise to further their elusiveness. Given the scale, complicity and increasing levels of sophistication involved in modern artifact trading, illicit activity is characterised as largely opaque with considerable investment in investigative efforts required to prove authenticity.

Additionally many of the original gold artifacts found were rather smelted into ingots before any analysis, as the raw materials were of more value to the looters than their cultural value. The trade and looting of these artifacts inevitably lead to the loss of many important archaeological and cultural knowledge.

=== Quimbaya airplanes claim ===
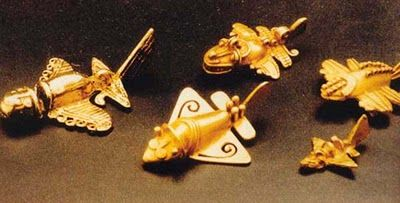
Quimbaya "Jets"

Of the Quimbaya artifacts, a handful of the stylised animal figures have been suggested by ancient astronaut theorists to be ancient portrayals of aircraft. This collection of artifacts are colloquially referred to under the broad term "Quimbaya Artifacts" or more misleadingly as the "Tolima fighter jets", the latter name stemming from the 2009 television program Ancient Aliens.

The collection included gold-works resembling local Quimbaya animals such as fish, frogs and reptiles, where the so called "jets" could be recognised as a form of bird or flying fish statue. The Ancient Aliens segment set out to prove the artifacts were rooted in representations of ancient aircraft. The program labels the objects as Tolima "jets", but they are also similar to local fish, such as flying fish or possibly the sucker-nosed catfish.

== Archaeological investigations ==
There has been scientific analysis of pre-Hispanic artifacts, especially of gold-works, on a compositional level, including the physical and radiocarbon examination of materials, techniques and the use of colour, to provide dating and potential geographical context. Archaeometric methods, including spectrophotometry and spectroscopy on metallurgical variations in composition, have also been used to establish information on origin. Cultural specificity is possible given that "different goldsmith cultures inhabited the Columbian territories" and that each of these utilised "different finishes and colours on their surfaces, under the techniques and alloys used.".

Given the importance of physical condition and the impacts of material damage and weathering to scientific analysis, the preservation, storage and restoration process for Quimbaya artifacts impacts how these materials are interpreted in modern times. Precise dating and geographical context are key indicators for identifying cultural, social and religious practices that may indicate traditional or ceremonial purposes.
