= NCERT textbook controversies =

Educational controversies in India

The National Council of Educational Research and Training (NCERT) is an apex resource organisation set up by the Government of India to assist and advise the central and state governments on academic matters related to school education. The model textbooks published by the council for adoption by school systems across India have sparked controversies over the years. The organisation has been accused of reflecting the political views of the party in power in the Government of India. At present, it is under scrutiny for saffronising school textbooks which includes alignment of the content with Hindutva pseudohistory and engagement in historical negationism.

== Background ==
The National Council of Educational Research and Training (NCERT) was established in 1961 by the Government of India by combining a number of existing organisations. It is an autonomous body in principle. However, it is government-funded and its director is appointed by the Ministry of Education (formerly the Ministry of Human Resource Development). In practice, the NCERT has operated as a semi-autonomous organisation promoting a "state-sponsored" educational philosophy.

In the early 1960s, national integration and unifying the various communities of India became a major concern to the government. Education was seen as an important vehicle for the emotional integration of the nation. The Minister of Education M. C. Chagla was concerned that the textbooks in history should not recite myths but be secular and rational explanations of the past. A committee on history education was established with the membership of Tara Chand, Nilakanta Sastri, Mohammad Habib, Bisheshwar Prasad, B. P. Saxena and P. C. Gupta, which commissioned a number of history textbooks to be authored by a number of prominent historians. Romila Thapar's Ancient India for Class VI was published in 1966, and Medieval India for Class VII in 1967. A number of other books, such as Ram Sharan Sharma's Ancient India, Satish Chandra's Medieval India, Bipan Chandra's Modern India, and Arjun Dev's India and the World, were published in the 1970s.

The textbooks have faced political pressures since their inception. In 1969, a Parliamentary Consultative Committee wanted the textbook on Ancient India to state categorically that the "Aryans" were indigenous to India. But the demand was rejected by the editorial board as well as Thapar (as the author). Further critical reactions came from Hindu and Sikh religious organisations that their respective religions and religious leaders were not glorified. The Hindu Mahasabha and Arya Samaj claimed that the mention of beef-eating in ancient times went counter to the religious sentiments of the "Hindu nationality".

Such controversies continue to this day. They mostly centre around the charges of an attempted "saffronised" rewriting of Indian history — i.e., making lessons consonant with Hindutva. Allegations of historical revisionism with a Hindu nationalist agenda arose several times: under the Janata Party government from 1977 to 1980 and again under the Bharatiya Janata Party government from 1998 to 2004 and from 2014 to the present.

== During the Janata Party government (1977–1979) ==
=== Memorandum 1977 ===
Three months into the Janata Party government headed by Morarji Desai, the Prime Minister was handed an anonymous memorandum by Nanaji Deshmukh, former Jana Sangh leader and general secretary of the Janata Party, which targeted the NCERT textbooks. The books criticised were Thapar's Medieval India and Bipan Chandra's Modern India, along with two other books, Freedom Struggle by Tripathi, De and Chandra, and Communalism and the Writing of Indian History by Thapar, Mukhia and Chandra. (Only the first two were NCERT textbooks.) The Prime Minister forwarded the memorandum to the Education Minister, suggesting that the books be withdrawn from circulation. In August 1977, R. S. Sharma's Ancient India was published, which was also targeted. The books were labelled to be "anti-Indian and anti-national" in content and "prejudicial to the study of history". The main issues seemed to be that they were not sufficiently critical of certain Muslim invaders during the medieval period and that they emphasised the role of leaders like Tilak and Aurobindo in the development of Hindu-Muslim antagonisms. The Hindu nationalist organisation Rashtriya Swayamsevak Sangh launched a separate campaign against the books in its magazine Organiser.

The memorandum got leaked, and a public debate ensued, which ran till 1979. The authors of the books argued for the legitimacy of independent interpretations as long as they were based on reliable evidence. The most hotly contested issue in the 1977 to 1979 controversy was the depiction of Mughal-era (Muslim rule) India and the role of Islam in India. In November 1977, a committee of reputable historians was asked to examine the textbooks, which supported their continuance. Nonetheless, the government passed an act in July 1978, withdrawing R. S. Sharma's Ancient India from the syllabus of the Central Board of Secondary Education.

== During the NDA government (1998–2004) ==
=== Saffronisation 2002 to 2003 ===
In 2002, under the NDA government spearheaded by the Bharatiya Janata Party (BJP), the government made an attempt at changing the NCERT school textbooks through a new National Curriculum Framework. Liberal historians raised objections to the new curriculum, claiming "saffronisation" of education by allegedly raising the profile of Hindutva cultural norms, views and historical personalities in school textbooks. The BJP opined that their only goal was to overhaul the stagnant and saturated institutions like NCERT and free them from the alleged dynastic control and hegemony of the Indian National Congress and the Communists. Party members also opined that their goal was not to promote sectarianism, but to present a more accurate picture of Indian history and Indian culture (such as Vedic science), which they said was being downplayed by the left-wing ideologues.

The NCERT removed many parts of the old History textbooks without asking the authors. In Ancient Indian History, the NCERT deleted references to beef-eating and cattle sacrifice; a critical evaluation of the Puranic and the epic traditions in the light of archaeological and epigraphic testimony, with reference to the antiquity of Ayodhya and the origin of Krishna worship in Mathura; the explanation of Brahminical hostility towards Ashoka despite his policy of religious tolerance; the exploitative and ideological aspects of the caste system; and the entire early life of Vardhamana Mahavira. In Medieval Indian History, they removed the allegedly dishonourable discussion on the execution of Guru Tegh Bahadur. In Modern Indian History, they deleted a one-line reference to the plundering activities of the Jat rulers of Bharatpur because it was thought noxious. The government claimed that these deletions were to respect the sentiments of Hindus, Sikhs, Jains, Dalits, and Muslims. However, there were no official explanations given, and many people believed it was a political decision to avoid mentioning uncomfortable facts about India's past.

In 2003, the NCERT launched new history textbooks for Classes VI, IX, and XI. They were authored by Professor Makkhan Lal for Class VI (unit II of India and the World: Social Sciences Book for Class VI) and for Class XI (Ancient India), and by Professor Hari Om for Class IX (Contemporary India). The syllabus was changed, and new chapters were added, like the "Evolution of Upanishadic Philosophy". The chapter on "Six Schools of Philosophy" was made a topic under the chapter "Jainism and Buddhism". The books gave more importance to Hindu culture and beliefs while giving very little space to Buddhism, Jainism, and actions of Muslim rulers. The new textbooks claimed to promote scientific temper, critical thinking, and authentic knowledge, but were criticised for reflecting a political and ideological agenda by carefully selecting what to include and what to remove.

=== Plagiarism 2003 ===
NCERT also attracted plagiarism accusations in 2003, mainly from the Frontline Magazine published by The Hindu. Contemporary World History, a textbook for Class 12, was found to contain several sections lifted from World Civilizations – Their History and Their Culture, authored by Edward MacNall Burns, Philip Lee Ralph, Robert E. Lerner and Standish Meacham. The latter book, published by American publishers W.W. Norton & Company Inc., has a special Indian edition, which is the only authorised, complete and unabridged reprint of the latest American edition.

== During the UPA government (2004–2014) ==
=== De-saffronisation 2004 ===
The NDA was defeated in the elections of 2004, and the new UPA government pledged to "de-saffronise" textbooks and curricula nationwide, and to restore the secular character of education. In March, the new NCERT textbooks were released, based on the texts used before the controversial 2002 updates. The Ministry of Human Resource Development, which oversaw this project, stated that it made only minor modifications to the books that predated the "saffronised" era. In Delhi, the Directorate of Education, in collaboration with the State Council of Educational Research and Training, prepared 47 new textbooks, and other state governments were expected to do likewise. In June 2004, a panel, composed of J. S. Grewal, Barun De and S. Settar, was constituted by the NCERT to review the new textbooks. This panel suggested that the textbooks that were being used in school syllabuses had poor content, were presented shoddily, and contained significant amounts of irrelevant information. The panel recommended to the Human Resource Development (HRD) Minister that the new books not be used until the defects could be resolved. This led the Delhi students to use textbooks that were used in school syllabuses from the pre-"saffronised" period.

Press reports indicated that the rush to "de-saffronise" school texts resulted in Urdu versions not being ready for the academic year, which began in April. The reports asserted that this failure hurt Urdu-speaking students by depriving them of needed textbooks. NCERT, however, denied these claims.

=== Sikhism 2006 ===
In 2006, the NCERT decided to amend a paragraph in its Class 12 History textbook, Modern India, after Sikh organisations protested "objectionable" references to Guru Gobind Singh. The original paragraph stated that Emperor Bahadur Shah tried to "conciliate the rebellious Sikhs" by making peace with Guru Gobind Singh and offering him a high mansab. The revised version changed this to state that Sikhs raised a revolt under Guru Gobind Singh in the early 18th century and, after his death, under Banda Bahadur. The CBSE subsequently instructed schools to use the new paragraph and not to teach the original.

=== Cartoons and paintings 2012 ===
In April 2012, the Republican Party of India (Athawale) demanded a ban on a Grade 11 textbook by the NCERT, saying a drawn cartoon in the book insulted B. R. Ambedkar. The book was originally published in 2006 but wasn't recognised as part of the syllabus until 2012. On 2 April, Ramdas Athawale held a press conference and burnt copies of the page from the textbook prescribed in the Political Science syllabus. He demanded the resignation of Union Minister for Human Resource Development, Kapil Sibal, who was also the president of the NCERT board. RPI workers burnt his effigy. The cartoon was part of the chapter titled "Constitution, why and how", in the book called Indian Constitution at Work. It showed Ambedkar sitting on a snail which was labelled 'Constitution' cracking a whip. Behind him was Pandit Nehru, also shown with a whip. The caption said: "Cartoonist's impression of the 'snail's pace' with which the Constitution was made". Athavale said the cartoon insulted the architect of India's Constitution, and the people responsible must be dealt with. The NCERT too had insulted him, he pointed out. The issue created uproar in both Houses of Parliament. NCERT chief advisors Yogendra Yadav and Suhas Palshikar resigned after the government issued an apology and promised to remove the cartoon. Speaking to reporters, Palshikar said it seemed like the government didn't have an option and therefore decided to agree with the protesting MPs. "The caricature was a symbol of the progressive outlook in education. This has now been undone. We are of the opinion that as advisors we can have a different opinion. Hence, we don't think it's appropriate for us to be in this position anymore."

In June 2012, a cartoon by R.K. Laxman on the anti‑Hindi agitation of 1965 drew strong criticism in Tamil Nadu. The Chief Minister, J. Jayalalithaa, demanded that NCERT remove the cartoon from the Class 12 Political Science textbook, saying it defamed Dravidian movement leaders like Periyar, C.N. Annadurai and others. She argued that photographs would teach students about the agitation more truthfully. The DMK, led by M. Karunanidhi also urged the central government to drop the cartoon. DMK spokesperson T.K.S. Elangovan claimed that cartoons should not be a part of textbooks because they could distort history and confuse students. The MDMK general secretary Vaiko, made the same demand; he said that though leaders like C. Rajagopalachari once supported Hindi, later they opposed its imposition.

A few months later, the NCERT dropped 6 cartoons from four Political Science textbooks. The contentious Dr B. R. Ambedkar cartoon in the Class XI book was replaced with a photograph of Dr Rajendra Prasad greeting Ambedkar. A cartoon on booth capturing and another, showing defection by politicians, were dropped. R. K. Laxman's anti-Hindi agitation cartoon was removed. Also, two cartoons on Indira Gandhi were dropped.

Soon after those controversies were solved, the Shahi Imam of Fatehpuri Mosque, Mohd. Mukarram Ahmed, sent a letter to Kapil Sibal asking the removal of two medieval paintings from the chapter 'The Central Islamic Lands'. One was of the Archangel Gabriel, while the other showed pilgrims at the Kaaba. According to Ahmed, both images were against Sharia. The letter, dated 10 September 2012, was also addressed to Delhi Chief Minister Sheila Dikshit, Education Minister Kiran Walia, and NCERT Chief Parvin Sinclair. In his letter, Ahmed stated that Jibreel (Gabriel) is the chief angel who delivered divine revelations to the Islamic Prophet and argued that the textbook's depiction of the Archangel presented him in a comical manner. He also objected to the caption accompanying the illustration of pilgrims at the Kaaba, which mentioned that they were "touching" the Black Stone, whereas, according to him, the established practice is to kiss it. He further remarked that the illustration of Jibreel was the most objectionable and asserted that it would not be tolerated. Responding to these objections, Najaf Haider, Associate Professor at the Centre for Historical Studies at the Jawaharlal Nehru University, disagreed with the demand for removal. He explained that the illustration of Gabriel had been taken from the 13th-century work Aja'ib al-Makhluqat, authored by the well-known scholar Qazwini. He further stated that the second illustration originated from a 15th-century collection of fragmented manuscripts. Haider also pointed out that the letter merely claimed that the illustrations violated Sharia without clearly identifying what was objectionable about them. He added that the original texts from which these illustrations were sourced had been produced in Muslim courts by scholars whom he described as being far more learned and devout than anyone could claim to be today.

== During the BJP/NDA government (2014–present) ==
=== Between 2017 and 2021 ===
In a Class 12 textbook titled Contemporary World Politics, the disputed Aksai Chin region was found to be coloured in the same colour as China. According to the NCERT, the controversial map was not a map of India but a map of East and South East Asia published by University of Texas at Austin. The map was replaced after a few months following media scrutiny.

The poem Sabse Khatarnak by the Hindi poet Pash was included in the NCERT textbook for Grade 11 Hindi students in 2006. In 2017, the BJP-affiliated RSS tried to remove it but failed.

In May 2017, the NCERT announced that it would review its textbooks for the first time since 2007. According to director Hrushikesh Senapaty, the goal of this process was to "plug the gaps" and update outdated information from the past decade, rather than a full revision of the books. In 2018, the NCERT performed the "review" exercise where it made 1,334 changes, which include additions, corrections and data updates, in 182 textbooks. The Class 12 Political Science textbook Politics in India Since Independence underwent controversial changes. The heading of a passage describing the 2002 Gujarat riots was changed from 'Anti-Muslim riots in Gujarat' to 'Gujarat riots'. However, in the same paragraph, the 1984 riots, which was described as anti-Sikh, was not renamed. The word "against Muslims" was deleted from one of the lines of the same passage, which read, "In February–March 2002, large-scale violence against Muslims took place in Gujarat". The revised version added the Swachh Bharat Abhiyan, Beti Bachao Beti Padhao and Digital India campaigns as well as demonetisation. Goods and Services Tax (GST) was introduced in Chapter 3 of the Class 11 Economics textbook.

In 2019, the NCERT performed the "rationalisation" exercise, where they cut significant chapters from their Class 9 and 10 History textbooks. From the Class 9 History textbook, chapters including 'Clothing: A Social History', 'History and Sport: The Story of Cricket', and 'Peasants and Farmers' were cut. Similarly, from the Class 10 History textbook, chapters on 'The Nationalist Movement in Indo-China', 'Work, Life and Leisure – Cities in the Contemporary World', and 'Novels, Society and History' were deleted. NCERT's director, Hrushikesh Senapaty, highlighted that students must have time to engage outdoors. The syllabus of Social Sciences, which covers History, Geography, Political Science, and Economics, had 24 chapters in Class 9 as compared to 15 each in Science and Mathematics. Similarly, Class 10 Social Sciences had 28 chapters as compared to 16 each in Science and Mathematics. This exercise brought down the total number of chapters in Social Sciences in Classes 9 and 10 to 20 and 25, respectively.

In May 2021, a controversy arose on social media over a poem in a Class 1 NCERT Hindi textbook. The poem, titled "Aam ki tokri" (Basket of Mangoes), was criticised for its use of the slang term "chhokri" for a girl and for allegedly promoting child labour. An IAS officer, Awanish Sharan, started the ruckus by calling for the poem's removal. However, NCERT defended the poem, stating it was meant to expose children to local languages. Experts were divided on the issue; some believed the term "chhokri" was not derogatory, while others felt the depiction of a child selling goods was insensitive in today's context.

=== Rationalisation 2022 ===
After the COVID-19 pandemic, the NCERT carried out the rationalisation exercise for the second time, saying that it would reduce the curriculum load on students. The council stated that a key objective was to facilitate a speedy recovery from learning losses and compensate for lost time during the pandemic. In addition to this, the National Education Policy (NEP) 2020 emphasised reducing content load to encourage a more holistic and creative learning approach over rote memorisation. NCERT also stated that the changes addressed overlapping content, material with a high difficulty level, and topics that were irrelevant or easily accessible to students through self-learning.

In 2022 the rationalised textbooks were released. It removed many topics related to Islamic history in India, which was controversial. The BJP, and many of its politicians, like Kapil Mishra, welcomed the move to eliminate part of the Mughal history from course books. This action attracted severe criticism from various factions of the Indian political arena. The removed chapter was related to 'Kings and Chronicles: The Mughal Courts (c. 16th and 17th centuries)' from the book 'Themes of Indian History – Part II' of Class 12.

From the Class 11 History syllabus, the chapters "Central Islamic Lands", "Confrontation of Cultures", and "The Industrial Revolution" were removed. Additionally, in Class 10 Political Science, chapters on "Democracy and Diversity", "Popular Struggles and Movements", and "Challenges to Democracy" were dropped. Apart from this, from the Class 12 Political Science textbook, Politics in India since Independence, the chapter "The Rise of Popular Movements" was removed, and so were references to controversies regarding the Emergency. Furthermore, the NCERT dropped content related to the Anandpur Sahib Resolution following objections from the Shiromani Gurdwara Parbandhak Committee (SGPC). The line "Anandpur Sahib Resolution could also be interpreted as a plea for a separate Sikh nation" was removed, as was the reference to "extreme elements" advocating for a separate Khalistan. Also, the chapters "The Cold War Era" and "US Hegemony in World Politics" were removed from another Class 12 Political Science book, Contemporary World Politics. From the Class 10 Democratic Politics-II textbook, the chapters 'Democracy and diversity', 'Popular struggles and movement' and 'Challenges to democracy' were removed.

From the Class 12 Political Science textbook titled Politics in India since Independence, references about how Mahatma Gandhi's "steadfast pursuit of Hindu-Muslim unity provoked Hindu extremists so much that they made several attempts to assassinate him" and how "he was particularly disliked by those who wanted Hindus to take revenge or who wanted India to become a country for the Hindus, just as Pakistan was for Muslims" were deleted from the sub-topic titled "Mahatma Gandhi's sacrifice" in the first chapter. The references to the crackdown on organisations spreading communal hatred, the ban on Rashtriya Swayamsevak Sangh (RSS) for some time, and the loss to appeal of communal politics, too, were removed. Also removed was the reference in the Class 12 History textbook to Gandhi's assassin Nathuram Godse as "a Brahmin from Pune" and "the editor of an extremist Hindu newspaper who had denounced Gandhiji as an appeaser of Muslims".

References to Dalit writer Omprakash Valmiki were removed from the social science textbooks of Classes 7 and 8 as part of the rationalisation.

More details about the controversial rationalised content were revealed in an investigation by The Indian Express, which scrutinised 21 rationalised history, political science and sociology textbooks for Classes 6 to 12 and matched their content with tables circulated within the NCERT on the proposed changes. These include:

- References to the 2002 Gujarat riots were removed from two textbooks. From the Class 12 Political Science textbook, Politics in India Since Independence, a section that included the chronology of events, criticism from the National Human Rights Commission (NHRC) of the Gujarat government, and a passage on the dangers of using religious sentiments for political purposes were removed. Also removed was former Prime Minister Atal Bihari Vajpayee's "raj dharma" remark to then-Chief Minister Narendra Modi. From the Class 12 Sociology textbook, Indian Society, a paragraph on communal violence was deleted. This passage mentioned that both major political parties, the Congress and the BJP, were in power during two of the most traumatic instances of communal violence: the 1984 anti-Sikh riots and the 2002 anti-Muslim violence in Gujarat.
- Five pages were removed from the chapter on the Emergency in the Class 12 Political Science textbook. The deleted content detailed controversies, abuse of power, and malpractices by the Indira Gandhi government during the period. It specifically mentioned the arrests of political workers, media restrictions, torture, forced sterilisations, and the large-scale displacement of the poor. The section also referenced the Shah Commission of Inquiry, which was set up to investigate these excesses. Additionally, a paragraph describing the "draconian impact" of the Emergency, including the suspension of Parliament and civil liberties, was deleted from the Class 12 Sociology textbook, Indian Society. Another reference to the curbs on trade union activities during the Emergency was removed from the Class 12 Sociology textbook, Social Change and Developing in India.
- Three chapters on protests that developed into social movements were removed from Political Science textbooks across Classes 6 to 12. The Class 12 Political Science textbook, Politics in India Since Independence, had a chapter on "popular movements" removed, which covered the Chipko movement, the Dalit Panthers, and the Narmada Bachao Andolan, among others. The chapter "Struggles for Equality" which described the Tawa Matsya Sangh's fight for the rights of displaced forest dwellers, was dropped from the Class 7 Political Science textbook. The Class 10 Political Science textbook lost a chapter on popular struggles that discussed pressure groups and movements, including the Narmada Bachao Andolan and the protest against water privatisation in Bolivia. The only chapter on social movements in the Class 11 and 12 Sociology curriculum was also significantly reduced, with a specific exercise box asking students to discuss the recent farmers' protests against the three farm laws.
- Two quotes by Jawaharlal Nehru on Emperor Ashoka and on the Bhakra Nangal Dam were removed from a Class 6 History and Class 12 Sociology textbooks respectively. A section on the arbitrariness of the colonial-era Sedition Act of 1870 and its contradiction of the rule of law was removed from the Class 8 Political Science textbook. Almost all references to Naxalism and the Naxalite movement were deleted from Social Science textbooks. This included the peasant uprising of 1967 and a box on the Naxalite ideologue Charu Majumdar from the Class 12 Political Science textbook.
- The Class 6 History textbook, Our Pasts – I, saw a significant reduction in the section on varnas, with sentences on the hereditary nature of the system and the Classification of people as untouchables being removed. A passage explaining that contact with certain groups was considered "polluting" and that many people rejected the varna system was also deleted. Furthermore, a section on "ashramas" was edited to remove the statement that women were generally not allowed to study the Vedas and had to follow the ashramas chosen by their husbands. A separate mention that women and shudras were not permitted to study the Vedas in ancient India was also dropped from the same textbook.
- In the Class 6 Political Science textbook, Social and Political Life – Part I, a large part of the chapter "Diversity and Discrimination" was removed. The deleted portion described how so-called "untouchables" were not allowed to take on certain jobs, enter upper-caste homes, draw water from the village well, or sit with other children in school. Another removed paragraph stated that caste-based discrimination not only limited economic activities but also denied Dalits respect and dignity.
- From the Class 12 Sociology textbook, Indian Society, four examples of how "untouchability" operates were dropped. These included examples of Dalits being confined to traditional occupations and being subjected to public humiliation and subordination. A passage from activist Harsh Mander's book, "Unheard Voices: Stories of Forgotten Lives", which described the difficult work of a Dalit manual scavenger, was also removed. The textbook also had a section on the upper caste's response to the increased visibility of Dalits through social movements removed. An excerpt from a paper on how Dalit women face greater threats than their upper-caste counterparts was also deleted from the final chapter on "social movements".
- Several sections related to minorities were also deleted from the textbooks. In the Class 6 Political Science textbook, a box that debunked the stereotype that Muslims are not interested in educating girls was removed, along with a photograph of three girls studying together.
- In the Class 12 Sociology textbook, Indian Society, a reference to the "newly acquired political power of the Hindu communalists" and how it makes it more difficult to settle disagreements over government protection for minorities was removed. Also, a passage on the political vulnerability of religious and cultural minorities was dropped. This passage explained that a numerical majority could use political power to suppress the institutions and identities of a minority community.
- A first-person account of a Muslim woman being asked to change her traditional attire following communal disturbances was deleted from a chapter on marginalisation in the Class 8 Political Science textbook.
- In the Class 7 History textbook, Our Pasts – II, several pages on the Delhi Sultanate were deleted. The removed content included a three-page section on the expansion of the Sultanate into southern India. A detailed chart comparing how Alauddin Khalji and Muhammad Tughluq responded to Mongol attacks was also left out. A definition of a masjid (mosque) and an explanation of congregational prayers were also removed.
- The chapter 'The Mughal Empire' was renamed to 'The Mughals (16th to 17th Century)'. The title of the chapter 'The Delhi Sultans' was changed to 'Delhi: 12th to 15 Century'.
- The chapter on the Mughal Empire in the same textbook also experienced cuts, including a two-page table that detailed the achievements of emperors such as Humayun, Shah Jahan, Babur, Akbar, Jahangir, and Aurangzeb. In the Class 12 History textbook, the entire chapter "Kings and Chronicles: The Mughal Courts" was deleted. This chapter focused on Mughal-era manuscripts like the Akbar Nama and Badshah Nama, which chronicled the History of the Mughals through their battles, hunting expeditions, and court scenes.

An earlier NCERT table, which was later replaced, indicated further revisions that were not reflected in the final version. These included:

- The title "Sultan" was removed from the name of Mahmud of Ghazni. The sentence stating he "raided the subcontinent almost every year" was changed to "he raided the subcontinent 17 times (1000-1025 CE) with a religious motive". A paragraph about his interest in learning about the people he conquered, including the scholar Al-Biruni's work "Kitab ul-Hind," was also cut.
- A section on Akbar's administration, his interest in different religions, and his commissioning of Sanskrit works to be translated into Persian was removed.
- The entire five-page content on independent political states like Awadh, Bengal, and Hyderabad that were formed from old Mughal provinces was erased. However, content on states controlled by the Rajputs, Marathas, Sikhs, and Jats was retained.

The chapter "Rulers and Buildings", which covered the architectural styles of temples built by Hindu kings and mosques, tombs, and forts constructed by Muslim rulers, was also removed from the Class 7 History textbook.

The deletions also affected Biology and Chemistry, as the Theory of Evolution and the Periodic Table were removed from the Class 10 Science textbook. Over 1,800 scientists, educators, and science communicators across India signed an open letter condemning NCERT's decision to remove Charles Darwin's Theory of Evolution from Class 10. The letter, issued by the Breakthrough Science Society, argued that excluding this foundational scientific concept would severely hinder students' critical thinking and understanding of the natural world. It emphasised that Darwin's theory highlighting the law-governed process of evolution without divine intervention has been central to rational thought since its inception.

NCERT also deleted several chapters on environment‑related issues from its school syllabus. Teachers, grouped under "Teachers Against the Climate Crisis" (TACC), expressed dismay at this decision. They said that a chapter on the greenhouse effect was removed from the Class 11 Geography syllabus, a chapter on weather, climate, and water was deleted from Class 7, and content about the monsoon was taken out of Class 9. The teachers argued that those topics were fundamental and should not have been removed.

On 8 June 2023, Suhas Palshikar and Yogendra Yadav, who were chief advisors for the Political Science books, said they were "embarrassed to be associated with these textbooks" after rationalisation of NCERT books and wrote a letter to the NCERT seeking removal of their names from Political Science books. Days later, 33 more academics from prominent Indian colleges also made a request to have their names removed.

A secretary in the Department of School Education and Literacy, Sanjay Kumar, dismissed the controversy over the rationalisation of NCERT textbooks as "much ado about nothing". In a June 2023 interview, he explained that the changes were made to reduce the curriculum burden on students during the COVID-19 pandemic and that due process was followed by expert committees. He also stated that textbooks must evolve with time and knowledge. He added that new textbooks based on the National Education Policy 2020 would be rolled out for the next academic session.

=== Post rationalisation ===
In April 2024, the NCERT revised its Political Science curriculum for Grades 11 and 12. Significant changes were introduced in the Class 12 History and Sociology textbooks, particularly concerning the Harappan civilisation and the Aryan migration theory. The NCERT justified these changes as "recent evidence from archaeological sites". Critics, however, argued that the revisions were politically motivated and aimed at downplaying the role of these events in shaping modern India. The updated History textbook cast doubt on the Aryan migration theory. The revised chapter titled "Bricks, Beads and Bones" stated that the Harappans were an indigenous people whose DNA had an "unbroken continuity for 5,000 years" with a majority of the present-day South Asian population. A sentence suggesting a break between the Early Harappan and later Harappan civilisations was removed. A new paragraph was added stating that Harappan genetic roots go back to 10,000 BCE. In the Sociology textbook, a section on Adivasi struggles was altered to remove the claim that SCs and STs are marked by poverty, powerlessness, and social stigma. An image of communal riots was removed from a book. The phrase "caste backgrounds" was changed to "social backgrounds".

Revisions to the Class 11 Political Theory textbook included a change in the description of the 2002 Gujarat riots, shifting from a focus on the killing of "mostly Muslims" to a more general statement that "more than 1,000 persons were killed". A statement about Nehru's criticism of the majority community's communalism was edited to remove "majority community" from the sentence. The Class 12 textbook Politics in India Since Independence underwent more extensive changes. The name "Babri Masjid" was removed and replaced with "a three-domed structure". The revised text now refers to the structure as being built at "the site of Shri Ram's birthplace". The section on Ayodhya was shortened from four pages to two, and detailed descriptions of events like the Rath Yatra, communal tensions, and the 1992 demolition of the mosque were removed or changed. The new version included a subsection discussing the 2019 Supreme Court verdict that led to the construction of the Ram temple. The textbook also changed the reference to a "military conflict over a border dispute" with China to "Chinese aggression on the Indian border". Furthermore, the term 'Azad Pakistan' was replaced with 'Pakistan Occupied Jammu and Kashmir' (POJK), and a section on the abrogation of Article 370 was added. A statement about the abductions of women was revised to remove the phrase "on both sides of the border". The definition of the "Left" was updated to describe those who favour state control of the economy. The chapter on recent developments now reflects the construction of the Ram Temple at Ayodhya, and a question about the demolition was changed to focus solely on the legacy of the movement.

The revised Class 11 Political Science textbook also associated 'vote-bank politics' with 'minority appeasement'. The updated textbook claimed that while there was nothing wrong with vote-bank politics in theory, in practice, it could lead to political parties ignoring the principle of equal rights for all citizens. The NCERT stated that the new version was a "relevant criticism of Indian secularism" and that the older textbook only intended to justify this kind of politics. A change was also made to a Class 12 Political Science textbook, where a paragraph about "multi-cornered political competition" was removed because it was considered "not relevant in the present context".

=== Modules ===
After the Chandrayaan-3 moon landing in August 2023, the NCERT released ten sets of reading modules titled Chandrayaan Utsav. The third module, named Chandrayaan Utsav – Bharat's Chandrayaan Mission, which was intended for middle-school students, drew scientific criticism for mixing science with mythology. The module suggested that ancient Indian texts, like the Vaimānika Shāstra, contained knowledge of flying vehicles. Scientists pointed out that a study by the Indian Institute of Science (IISc) showed the concepts in the Vaimānika Shāstra were not aerodynamically sound, and a plane built on them would not fly, and demanded its withdrawal. The study also revealed that the text was not ancient and was written only in the 20th century. Former ISRO Chairman G. Madhavan Nair also stated that there was no physical evidence to support these mythological claims, calling them "scientific fiction". The Breakthrough Science Society (BSS) also joined in the criticism, demanding that the government stop presenting mythology as historical fact. The NCERT initially withdrew the reading module after the controversy erupted but reintroduced it after the government defended its content, stating that mythology and philosophy put forward ideas that lead to innovation. Reports also claimed that the 17-page module excessively focused on Prime Minister Narendra Modi's role rather than on the contributions of ISRO and consistently referred to the country as 'Bharat' instead of India in the English version.

Before Independence Day in August 2025, a new NCERT module named Partition Horrors was released, which started a significant controversy, as it blamed three key parties for the Partition of India. The module, intended for secondary-stage students, specifically stated that the culprits were Muhammad Ali Jinnah, who demanded the Partition; the Indian National Congress, which accepted it; and then-Viceroy Lord Mountbatten, who implemented it. The module asserted that the Partition was not inevitable and that Congress leaders like Nehru and Patel accepted it out of fear of civil war. The Congress party sharply criticised the module's narrative. A party spokesperson, Pawan Khera, called for the document to be "torn up" because it did not mention the role of the Hindu Mahasabha, which he claimed first suggested the idea of separate nations for Hindus and Muslims in 1938. He also stated that the Partition was the result of a "nexus between the Hindu Mahasabha and the Muslim League". On 19 August, the Congress-affiliated National Students' Union of India (NSUI) protested at Delhi University's Faculty of Arts against what it termed the RSS-BJP's hateful and distorted NCERT module.

A few months after Operation Sindoor, which happened in May 2025, the NCERT launched two sets of modules named Operation Sindoor—A Saga of Valour and Operation Sindoor—A Mission of Honour and Bravery for students in Grades 3 through 10. These modules, presented as interactive discussions, faced criticism for their inclusion of political content. They featured at least four quotes from Prime Minister Narendra Modi, a plug for the "Make in India" initiative, and a reference to Home Minister Amit Shah. The modules state that Pakistan denied any involvement in the Pahalgam attack, but it was carried out on "direct orders" by "Pakistan's military and political leadership", and they also used a dramatic, classroom-based scenario to explain terrorism, which was seen as a problematic teaching method.

=== New textbooks ===
Between 2023 and 2026, the NCERT gave Hindi titles to several of its new English-medium textbooks. Critics, including Kerala's Education Minister V. Sivankutty, viewed the move as an "illogicality" and "cultural imposition", arguing that it undermined linguistic diversity and federal principles. However, NCERT explained that the new names were chosen "thoughtfully to convey rootedness in India's culture." This decision broke from the long-standing tradition of matching the book title to the language of instruction and was seen by some as an attempt to impose Hindi in non-Hindi-speaking states. The name changes include:

- In Classes 1 and 2: The textbook for English was renamed to Mridang.
- In Classes 3, 4 and 5: Textbooks for English and Mathematics were renamed to Santoor and Maths Mela, respectively, and new books for Arts and Physical Education were released for the first time with the names Bansuri and Khel Yoga, respectively.
- In Classes 6, 7 and 8: Textbooks for English and Mathematics were renamed to Poorvi and Ganita Prakash, respectively, and new books for Arts, Physical Education and Vocational Education were released for the first time with the names Kriti, Khel Yatra and Kaushal Bodh, respectively.
- In Class 9: Textbooks for English and Mathematics were renamed to Kaveri and Ganita Manjari, respectively, and new books for Arts, Physical Education and Skill Education were released for the first time with the names Madhurima, Khen Praveen and Kaushal Vikas, respectively.

In July 2024, NCERT published new textbooks for Grade 6. The textbook for Social Science now states that India had its own prime meridian, called the "Madhya Rekha", which passed through Ujjain. The same textbook refers to the Harappan Civilisation as the "Sindhu-Sarasvati Civilisation". It also mentions that archaeologists use other names for the Civilisation, such as "Indus" and "Harappan", and that it would be using all these terms. The textbook also includes the absence of references to caste-based discrimination and modifications in the depiction of B.R. Ambedkar's experiences with discrimination.

A controversy arose when it was reported that new textbooks for classes 3 and 6 lack the Preamble to the Constitution. Professor Ranjana Arora, Head of the Department of Curriculum Studies and Development at NCERT, stated that NCERT is now giving equal importance to different facets of the Constitution in various textbooks to provide a more holistic understanding of constitutional values. She also added that the idea that only the Preamble reflected these values was a flawed and narrow view, and this new approach was in line with the vision of the National Education Policy 2020.

In April 2025, NCERT released new Class 7 Social Science textbook that removed all references to the period of Muslim rule in India. The content on dynasties such as the Tughlaq, Khalji, Mamluk, Lodi and Mughals was dropped. In their place, new content focusing on ancient "Indian" kingdoms and dynasties such as the Magadha, Maurya, Shunga, and Satavahanas was added. The revised curriculum also introduced a new chapter titled "How the Land Becomes Sacred", which covers sacred and pilgrimage sites across India. Additionally, references to the Maha Kumbh and various central government initiatives were included.

On 16 July 2025, NCERT released new Class 8 Social Science textbook that sparked significant controversy. The book describes Babur as a "brutal and ruthless conqueror, slaughtering entire populations of cities", and Akbar as a ruler whose reign combined both brutality and tolerance—including ordering the massacre of some 30,000 civilians at Chittorgarh. Aurangzeb is portrayed as a military ruler who destroyed temples and gurdwaras, reinstated jizya, and exhibited religious intolerance. To contextualise these portrayals, the textbook includes a "Note on Some Darker Periods in History", clarifying that no one today should not be held accountable for historical atrocities and urging students to engage with history dispassionately. These descriptions were criticised by academics and educators for promoting a communal and ideologically skewed view of medieval history. The textbook also refers to "many instances of religious intolerance" during the medieval period, especially under Mughal rule. NCERT stated that it aimed to highlight both the bright and dark sides of historical periods, but critics argue the emphasis is clearly placed on Mughal atrocities.

References to Razia Sultan, who ruled the Delhi Sultanate, and Emperor Jahangir's wife, Nur Jahan, were dropped. On the other hand, the new textbook expands the section on the Maratha empire and adds a new section titled "Mighty Maratha Women", which highlights figures like Tarabai—described as a "fearless warrior queen" who resisted Emperor Aurangzeb's expansion efforts and as "the architect of the northward Maratha expansion", and Ahilyabai Holkar who is credited with being "instrumental in the Maratha expansion in North India".

Also, references to Tipu Sultan, Hyder Ali and the four Anglo–Mysore Wars were removed. These figures, once central in older editions, were replaced by a broader focus on topics such as Vasco da Gama's arrival, the Battle of Plassey, colonial economic exploitation, and tribal uprisings. The new textbook now includes an entire chapter on the Maratha Empire. It refers to the Anglo-Maratha wars (1775–1818) and states that "the British took India from the Marathas more than from the Mughals or any other power".

The Class 8 textbook also describes how the colonial powers "drained India of its wealth", stating that colonisers extracted "many billions of pounds" from India, with a recent estimate putting the figure at $45 trillion. The book argues that had this wealth remained in India, the country would have been very different at the time of its independence. It also states that the construction of railways in India was not a gift from the colonial rulers, but was paid for with Indian tax revenue and served British interests. Additionally, the book mentions that colonisers stole thousands of statues, paintings, jewels, and manuscripts from India, sending them to European museums or private collections, calling it a "massive theft" that happened throughout the colonised world.

Inaccuracies were found on the topic of the Ahom dynasty. The textbook states that the Ahoms migrated from Myanmar, but historical evidence suggests their origins were in China. It also describes the Paik system as "forced labour" and portrays the 1663 treaty of Ghilajarighat as a defeat for the Ahoms, rather than a strategic truce. Former Odisha Chief Minister Naveen Patnaik criticised the NCERT for excluding the Paika Rebellion from its history textbooks. NCERT responded that the rebellion would be included in the second volume of the Grade 8 Social Science textbook, scheduled for release in September–October 2025.

In August 2025, Chaitanya Raj Singh, King (Maharawal) of the erstwhile kingdom of Jaisalmer criticised a map in NCERT's Class 8 Social Science textbook that shows Jaisalmer as part of the Maratha Empire. He called it "historically misleading and baseless", saying there was no record of Maratha rule or taxation in Jaisalmer. Other Rajasthan royals supported his objection. Due to this, the NCERT set up an expert committee to review the content.

In December 2025, NCERT released the second part of the Class 7 Social Science textbook that details Mahmud of Ghazni’s seventeen expeditions into India, specifically focusing on the plunder of temples in Mathura and Kannauj and the destruction of the Somnath temple. His campaigns are described as involving the 'slaughter of tens of thousands'. The new textbook introduces a shift in perspective by categorising these events as "invasions" rather than "raids". The same textbook describes Muhammad Ghori as a ruler who primarily sought territorial conquest within the Indian subcontinent. It also blames his army commander Bakhtiyar Khilji for the destruction of major Buddhist learning centres like Nalanda and Vikramashila. The textbook says that there is a consensus among historians of Buddhism that this destruction of its large centres of learning precipitated the decline of Buddhism in India.

In February 2026, NCERT released the second part of the Class 8 Social Science textbook that introduces a section on "corruption in the judiciary" as one of the major challenges faced by the Indian judicature. The chapter, titled "The Role of the Judiciary in Our Society", lists key issues including judicial corruption and its negative impact on public confidence and access to justice, especially for the poor; massive backlog of pending cases, cited as approximately 81,000 in the Supreme Court, 62.4 lakh in High courts, and 4.7 crore in district and subordinate courts (totalling over 5 crore cases nationwide); shortage of judges; complicated legal procedures; and inadequate infrastructure as contributive factors. The text quotes former Chief Justice of India B. R. Gavai, from July 2025, acknowledging instances of corruption and misconduct while emphasising the need for swift, decisive, and transparent action to rebuild trust, along with references to judicial codes of conduct; the Centralised Public Grievance Redress and Monitoring System (CPGRAMS)—which received over 1,600 complaints between 2017 and 2021; and parliamentary impeachment procedures for judges.

On 25 February 2026, CJI Surya Kant publicly stated that the Supreme Court would take suo motu cognisance of the content. He declared, "I will not allow anyone on earth to defame the institution. Howsoever high they be, nobody is above the law," and affirmed that "the law will take its course." The remarks followed concerns raised by senior advocate Kapil Sibal in court, who called the inclusion "absolutely scandalous". On 26 February, the Supreme Court ordered the “blanket and complete” ban on the textbook. On 10 March, the NCERT issued an "unconditional and unqualified apology" for the chapter in question. The case resulted in a Supreme Court ruling for the removal of three NCERT members 'from rendering any service that would involve payment to them from public funds', with Supreme Court Judge Surya Kant remarking, “We know how to deal with such persons. They must also know how to deal with the current CJI.” The CJI also alleged members on social media, termed as "anti-social elements", acted "irresponsibly" in the coverage of the news and directed the Government of India to identify individuals to take action against them. "I am not a person who is going to leave these elements...they must also realise how to deal with the current CJI! I will deal with them also", the CJI said while also maintaining that the court is not opposed to criticism but that an expert committee to highlight them is a welcome step forward.

Another controversy erupted on June 15, 2026, when it was reported that the NCERT had included a visually modified image of the iconic Indus Valley Civilisation "Dancing Girl" figurine in its new Class 9 Arts textbook, Madhurima. The sculpture, traditionally depicted with a bare torso, appeared with shaded modifications covering its upper body. Critics, including Michel Danino, who headed the textbook development committee for NCERT's new Class 6 Social Science books, strongly condemned the alteration, arguing that modifying a historical artifact to obscure its original nudity based on modern sensibilities created a "fake artifact" and reflected a "Victorian view" of appropriateness. In response to the criticism, an NCERT official stated that the issue had been referred to the textbook development team for review, while noting that the original, unaltered depiction of the sculpture remained present in the Class 6 Social Science textbook.

On 24 June 2026, academicians and educational organizations in Karnataka raised strong objections to the NCERT's newly introduced Class 6 Kannada textbook, titled Krishna. Critics, including V P Niranjanaradhya, developmental educationist, alleged that the textbook sidelined Karnataka's local cultural and regional diversity in favor of a "mythology-heavy" and God-centric narrative. He also questioned the textbook's title, arguing that naming it Krishna (and the Class 3 textbook Mridula) was an attempt to "saffronise" education. Further controversy arose over a lesson on balanced diets, which critics argued promoted a purely vegetarian or satvik bias by completely omitting regional staples like eggs, fish, and meat from its illustrations. Educationists condemned the changes as a cultural imposition that ignored local traditions, demanding that the textbook be renamed to reflect Kannada identity and revised to include diverse dietary choices.

On 26 June 2026, a new Social Science textbook for Class 9 was released which dropped the definition of the word 'preamble' and its core ideas, such as secularism and federalism, while adding a topic on the Emergency. The Special Intensive Revision (SIR) is, despite controversies, defined in the book as an exercise conducted to ensure "that no eligible citizen is left out of the voter list and no ineligible person is included". It praises the Election Commission of India (ECI) for conducting elections 'impartially' despite challenges such as 'fake news, misinformation and intimidation'. Though the SIR has been opposed due to unethical voter deletions and additions since the 2025 Indian electoral controversy, the new textbooks says that names are only deleted based on death of the voter, change of residence, duplicate enrolment and if someone is permanently untraceable. The new textbook now describes the Indian judiciary as ‘impartial and independent’ as opposed to the Class 8 textbook that got scrutinised for highlighting corruption in the judiciary. The most controversial change is the addition of a verse from Manusmriti to describe the tradition of respecting women during and after the Vedic period.

In July 2026, the NCERT released a revised version of the class 8 Social Science textbook that previously got banned by the Supreme Court. The revised textbook deleted the sections such as 'Corruption in Judiciary' and 'Challenges Faced by the Judicial System' and classroom discussions on the Supreme Court's judgements on Section 66A of the Information Technology Act and the electoral bonds scheme. These were replaced by a detailed discussion on Public Interest Litigation (PIL). The version of Congress' position on Partition was tweaked and now says that its acceptance as the only way forward remains a matter of debate. The new edition removes a sentence that said "the Congress leaders were helpless as communal massacres engulfed the subcontinent during Partition". The revised textbook also expands the story of the demand for complete independence by adding that “a similar demand for Swaraj was expressed by VD Savarkar in 1925”. Also, the revised edition now states that Bose “sought support from the anti-British forces”, removing references to Hitler and Nazi ideology.

In late September 2026, the second part of the class 9 social science textbook was released. The textbook cites many schemes of the Modi-led government as "excellent examples of policy making". This includes the National Education Policy 2020, Ayushman Bharat Scheme and Khelo Bharat Niti. It describes the medieval Indian history as a period of “Resistance and Resilience”, mentioning Islamic invasions and acts of resistance by Indian rulers and not of cooperation or the development of a composite culture. The textbook claims that many kings and princes received swords from goddesses such as Kali, Durga, and Bhavani to resist invasions from the seventh century onwards. It also presents the Sengol as a symbol of the 1947 transfer of power to Nehru, even though historians dispute this interpretation.

== Reception and analysis ==
According to S. Irfan Habib, a historian, the rewriting of history is in line with the BJP's attempts to impose its Hindu nationalist propaganda. Habib said, "politicisation of students' textbooks leads to the polarisation of the country by presenting a skewed past". He further called it "a conscious act by the present government to pursue agendas to further the religious divide in India by brainwashing young kids. The current government is assaulting the ethos of India by poisoning the school curriculum".

According to Apoorvanand, a University of Delhi professor, Narendra Modi's Hindu nationalist government "seeks to portray India as a historically Hindu-only land". He adds, "marginalisation of Mughals and Muslims in textbooks mirrors what Muslims in Modi's India are facing in real life. The recent textbook edits are part of a cultural genocide".

According to Audrey Truschke, a historian at Rutgers University, "erasing Mughals from textbooks does not erase them from India's history". According to Harbans Mukhia, a historian of medieval India, the Modi-led BJP is using a strategy to win the next general elections in 2024 by unifying the Hindu vote by way of attaching the narrative that Hindus are under threat from Muslims.

According to Aditya Mukherjee, a professor of contemporary Indian history, the removal of Mughal history from the textbook was an attempt to erase the history of a particular community, which is usually followed by a genocide of the community.

According to Suhas Palshikar, a political scientist, the deletion exercise is an "act of rewriting", adding that the BJP government intends "not to mention inconvenient facts".

According to Romila Thapar, NCERT's revised history textbooks present a politicised and distorted version of India's past. She criticised the deletion of entire chapters and specific information, such as those related to the Mughal court and certain aspects of ancient Indian society, which she argued was an attempt to create a communal and one-sided historical narrative. Thapar believes this move undermined the principles of objective and evidence-based historical study, which she saw as crucial for a proper education. She maintains that the changes were part of a broader political agenda to promote a specific ideology rather than a genuine effort to improve the curriculum.

According to Angshuman Kar, a professor at the University of Burdwan, these omissions present a fragmented view of India's history, potentially erasing the image of a country that celebrated unity in diversity. Kar emphasised that while multiple interpretations of historical events are possible, well-established facts should not be altered. He expressed concern that such revisions might be ideologically motivated, aiming to manipulate young minds through education. Kar also highlighted that history is not solely written in textbooks but is also inscribed in the collective memory of people, which cannot be erased at will.

According to Dr Ruchika Sharma, a historian specialising in medieval Indian history with a PhD from Jawaharlal Nehru University, the recent changes to NCERT history textbooks were riddled with factual inaccuracies and were ideologically driven. She argued that the textbooks presented a simplified and incomplete narrative that villainised the Mughal rulers while ignoring similar actions by other kings. For instance, she pointed out that the textbooks selectively described Akbar's siege of Chittor as brutal while omitting or downplaying comparable acts of violence by rulers like the Cholas. Sharma also contested the claim that the jizya tax was primarily an incentive for conversion, asserting that Akbar abolished it early in his reign as a moral decision, a fact documented in the Ain-i-Akbari, which the revised textbooks allegedly misrepresented. She further criticised the removal of powerful women like Razia Sultan and Nur Jahan from the narrative, stating it was an injustice that erased the history of empowered Muslim women in pre-modern India. Sharma concluded that the changes were a "communal blueprint masquerading as history" that aimed to sow ideological anger in students.

In 2017, a study conducted by a 21-year-old French Political Science student, Anais Leclere, for the NGO Action Aid, found that NCERT textbooks for Classes 2 to 5 reinforced gender stereotypes. The study analysed ten textbooks across subjects like Hindi, Mathematics, English, and Environmental Studies. The findings revealed a clear gender division, with men often shown in outdoor activities and as the head of the family, while women were confined to domestic roles, performing household chores and childcare. A Class 5 English textbook showed a significant gender imbalance, with 56% men and only 20.6% women in its illustrations. The study also noted the "masculinisation of jobs" with terms like "milkman" and "policeman" being used. Phrases like "father's hard-earned money" reinforced the stereotype of men as the sole breadwinners, while a Class 2 textbook contained the sentence, "I wonder if my teacher will look like my mother or grandmother", which also contributed to these stereotypes. Action Aid planned to submit its findings to NCERT, recommending that gender equality be prioritised, that gender studies be implemented from Class 1, and that teacher training on the subject be provided. The NGO also demanded that NCERT replace the current textbooks and adopt gender-neutral language.

== See also ==
- Bias in curricula
- Saffronisation
- California textbook controversy over Hindu history
- Karnataka textbook controversy
- Pakistani textbooks controversy
- Hindutva pseudohistory
