= Javed Bora =

ULFA activist

Javed Bora (Real name: Partha Pratim Bora) was a centrle committee member and Secretary in Foreign Affairs of the outlawed outfit United Liberation Front of Asom. He was son of veteran Assamese nationalist leader Nibaran Bora. In 1990, Bora went to Dhaka to establish connection between ULFA and ISI and to set up a base camp there. Bora was trained in Kachin and Pakistan.

== Arrest & death ==
Bora, who was wanted for killing Hiteswar Saikia's nephew, was arrested in Guwahati on 4 January 1992. Couple of days after his release on bail, Bora was killed by unknown gunmen in Dibrugarh district, allegedly the Army.

== Bibliography ==
- Deka, Kanaksen (1994). ULFAR SWADHIN ASOM (in Assamese) (1st ed.). Guwahati: Dispur Print House.
- Bhattacharyya, Rajeev (2023). ULFA: The Mirage of Dawn. Noida, Uttar Pradesh, India: HarperCollins. ISBN 978-93-5699-304-4.
