= Operation Bajrang =

Part of Indian operations against North-eastern militants (1990–91)

Coordinates: 27.7214°N 95.1569°E

- Part of Indian military operations against North-eastern militants
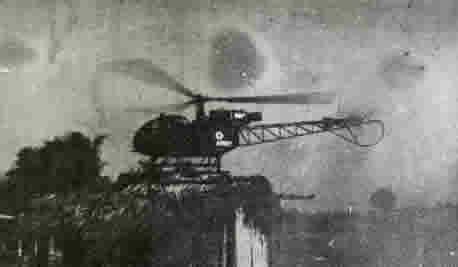
- Army Aviation helicopter during the operation
Date	28 November 1990 – 20 April 1991
Location	Assam
Result	Operation Failure

Belligerents
(India) Indian Army	ULFA

Commanders and leaders
(India) Lieutenant general Ajai Singh	Paresh Baruah

Strength
30,000	1,250

Operation Bajrang (28 November 1990 – 20 April 1991) was a military operation, conducted by the Indian army, in Assam, against the militant organization, United Liberation Front of Asom (ULFA).

Its primary objective was to flush out ULFA militants. It was launched without good intelligence, specific knowledge of the terrain, and other geographic advantages of the state. The army started the operation from the ULFA camps, but it wasn't successful, as the camps were deserted. Thus the operation did not succeed, and it was suspended after six months.

During the operation, there were numerous instances of army atrocities, including rape, torture, and killing of civilians, which was unearthed by several human rights organizations. The main outcome of the operation was that it forced the ULFA to leave their Central Headquarter (CHQ) and their General Headquarter (GHQ).

== Background ==
During the Assam Movement, there was an uprising of nationalism in Assam with the outcome of the formation of several militant outfits including ULFA. The ULFA emerged as a powerful militant organization in North-east India within a decade of its formation in 1979. It also came to light that the organization was getting support from the then State Home Minister Bhrigu Phukan. Enjoying a soft-eye of the AGP government (1985–1990), the organization became strong with a large recruitment drive and the killing of many Congress leaders, police officers, and civilians. The organization also killed former state Chief Minister and Governor of Mizoram Hiteswar Saikia's brother Rohiteswar Saikia along with his security personnel and the driver on 23 July 1990. The organization gunned down the Superintendent of police of Dibrugarh district Daulat Singh Negi on 29 July 1990, which lowered the morale of the police. ULFA also developed its connection with the Sri-Lankan militant outfit Liberation Tigers of Tamil Eelam (LTTE). The killing of Surrendra Paul, brother of Lord Swraj Paul, created massive pressure on Janata Dal government led by Prime Minister Chandra Shekhar. The Asom Gana Parishad led state government was held responsible for the poor law and order situation. The then BJP president and MP L K Advani demanded the dismissal of the Assam government and sought Army action against the ULFA in parliament debate. The Prime Minister Chandra Shekhar had to take the decision to dismiss the Assam government and order Army action against the ULFA.

On 27 November 1990 the Government of India dismissed the AGP led Government of Assam under Article 356 of the Indian constitution, imposed President's Rule on Assam. The Indian government also banned the militant outfit ULFA classifying it as a terrorist organisation and launched Operation Bajrang against the ULFA.

The Indian government also imposed Armed Forces (Special Powers) Act (AFSPA), Terrorists and Disruptive Activities (Prevention) Act (TADA), and Assam Disturbed Areas Act, which gave complete power to the army.

== The operation ==
The operation was started on the night of 27 November 1990. The army started the operation in the dense forest of Lakhipathar (in Tinsukia district) where the ULFA had their Central Headquarter (CHQ) and General Headquarter (GHQ) in the forests of Charaipung (in Sivasagar district), and continued operation in all districts of Assam. In the operation, 15 brigades of the army were used, but the army started the operation without proper intelligence and planning. In the operation, the Army Aviation helicopters were also used to reconnoiter the dense forests of Lakhpathar and Charaipung. But the information about the operation was leaked to the ULFA Commander-in-chief Paresh Baruah, who had a strong intelligence network. Baruah then ordered to evacuate all the camps two days before the operation was started. The ULFA made a setup for the army with landmines and booby traps in the camps of Lakhipathar and Charaipung before the camps were emptied and left with a few junior cadres to strike back.

With a few junior ULFA cadres left in the camps of Lakhipathar and Charaipung, the army faced gunfights for a few days and captured the camps of Lakhipathar and Charaipung. The army had to lose some of their jawans including Vijay Singh and Swarn Singh, while ULFA lost Krishna Chetia, a close cadre of Paresh Baruah. Some army personnel were also killed in landmine explosions. A total of fourteen landmines exploded on the day of the entry of the army, but there are no confirmed official records available about army casualties.

During the operation, the ULFA-LTTE link was also exposed as an LTTE militant Dinesh Kumar visited the Lakhipathar camp, and the landmines found in Lakhipathar were similar to those used by LTTE during that period. The LTTE facilitated ULFA with guerrilla training in Jaffna, in early 1990 and provided weapons and explosives.

A mass grave of more than fifty bodies was found in the Lakhipathar camp of persons who were executed by the ULFA in the camp as capital punishment. One of those bodies was of All Tai Ahom Student Union (ATASU) leader Dimbeswar Gogoi. Some other bodies were of Congress(I) member Rana Goswami, and Special branch's Inspector of police Giausddin Ahmed.

- As per the Indian Army claim, 48 ULFA militants were arrested, 174 weapons seized, and one Maruti Gypsy car and one Motorcycle recovered during the operation.
- As per the India Today report, in the operation, 15 activists (including sympathizers and civilians) were killed, seized 1208 weapons, and ₹50 million (US$520,000), and over 2000 suspected militants were arrested. In another report, India Today stated that between November 1990 and March 1991, the ULFA killed 97 people including Assam Pradesh Congress(I) Committee's General Secretary Manabendra Sarma. The report also cited that a team of the Committee for the Protection of Democratic Rights (CPDR), visiting the state, found clear evidence of 58 atrocities, including rape and torture.
- According to journalist B. G. Verghese, ₹50 million (US$520,000) and 32 gold bars were recovered during Operation Bajrang.
- According to author Ved Prakash, in Operation Bajrang 209 militants were captured, and the army recovered cash of ₹48 million and huge quantities of arms.
- Scholar and author Hiren Gohain, visiting the areas of operation, cited the army's actions as brutalization.

Though ULFA had to lose their Lakhipathar and Charaipung camps, the army failed to nab any of the top leaders of ULFA, resulting in the operation as failed with the army's atrocities.

On 8 January 1991, the then Governor of Assam Devi Das Thakur announced that the Indian government is open for a lateral talk with the ULFA. Prime Minister Chandra Shekhar too announced the same in Rajya Sabha, and, in February 1991, the ULFA declared a unilateral ceasefire.

As the state election was in the door, ULFA assured that they won't disrupt the election, and Prime Minister Chandra Shekhar suspended the operation. On 20 April, Operation Bajrang was called off and the army was returned to barracks, and the army was withdrawn on 16 May. The operation was finally suspended with effect from 26 June.

== Human rights violation by Indian Army ==
=== Rapes ===
Human Rights organization Amnesty International asserted that, during operation Bajrang, villagers of Assam were terrorized as the Indian army committed violence of rape, murder, and illegal arrests. Numerous rape cases by the Indian army were reported during Operation Bajrang. There were also parliamentary debates in the Rajya Sabha of India about the rapes committed by the Indian Army during Operation Bajrang. But no army personnel ever had to face any trial as the Armed Forces (Special Powers) Act provides the power to the army as "Army officers have legal immunity for their actions. There can be no prosecution, suit or any other legal proceeding against anyone acting under that law. Nor is the government's judgment on why an area is found to be disturbed subject to judicial review."

=== Killing and arrest of civilians ===
Amnesty International also asserted that a total of 12 civilians were killed in army custody, over 100 Habeas corpus petitions were filed at the Gauhati High Court between 27 November 1990 to March 1991 seeking the whereabouts of the people who were illegally detained by the Army, and 1846 people were arrested by the army and more than 1000 people were arrested by the police in suspect of ULFA militants. Mumbai based human rights organisation the Committee for Protection of Human Rights (CPDR) also found army atrocity evidence by visiting 6 districts of the state.

== Aftermath ==
After Operation Bajrang was called off, the Assam Legislative Assembly election was held, Congress(I) won the election and Hiteswar Saikia became the Chief Minister of the state.

Following the suspension of Operation Bajrang, the state government announced a "surrender scheme" that offered Rs 50,000 cash, loans up to Rs 2 Lakh, and jobs for the qualified. Also, following political controversy over Operation Bajrang, Governor Devi Das Thakur resigned in March and Loknath Mishra took charge as the Governor of Assam.

During the operation, most of the senior leaders escaped to their Bangladesh's camp in Sherpur, but Sunil Nath and Paresh Baruah stayed in Assam to continue the militancy activities. After the suspension of Operation Bajrang, the ULFA started revamping the organization with killing, extortion, and kidnapping.

In 2013, KPS Gill, who served as the Director general of police of Assam and Punjab, opined that Operation Bajrang was not necessary as it created mistrust between Security forces and civil society and also took lives of many innocent people.

== Bibliography ==
=== Books ===
- Pisharoty, Sangeeta Barooah (2019). Assam: The Accord, The Discord. [India]: Penguin Random House India Private Limited. ISBN 978-93-5305-622-3.
- India: Torture, Rape & Deaths in Custody. London, U.K.: Amnesty International. 1992. ISBN 9780862102098.
- Human Rights in India: The Updated Amnesty International Report. New Delhi: Vistaar Publications in association with Amnesty International Publications. 1993. ISBN 978-81-703-6325-5.
- Szajkowski, Bogdan; Terranova, Florence (2004). Revolutionary and Dissident Movements of the World (4th ed.). London: John Harper Publishing. ISBN 978-0954381127.
- Dobhal, Harsh; Jacob, Mathew (2012). Rugged Road to Justice: A Social Audit of State Human Rights Commissions in India. Vol. 1. New Delhi: Human Rights Law Network. ISBN 9788189479831.
- Chima, Jugdep S. (2015). Ethnic Subnationalist Insurgencies in South Asia: Identities, Interests and Challenges to State Authority. New York, NY, Abingdon, Oxon: Routledge. ISBN 978-1-317-55706-7.
- Chadha, Vivek (2005). Low Intensity Conflicts in India: An Analysis. New Delhi: Sage Publications. ISBN 978-81-321-0201-4.
- Sarmah, Bhupen; Jana, Arun K., eds. (2002). Class, Ideology and Political Parties in India. Colorado Springs, CO: International Academic Publishers. ISBN 9781588681713.
- Gates, Scott; Roy, Kaushik (2016). Unconventional Warfare in South Asia : Shadow Warriors and Counterinsurgency. London; New York: Routledge, Taylor & Francis. ISBN 978-1-4094-3706-2.
- Gogoi, Dilip (2016). Unheeded Hinterland: Identity and sovereignty in Northeast India. Taylor & Francis. ISBN 9781138100091.
- Pattnaik, Dr. S N; Kabi, Dr KH (2015). Media, conflict and peace in Northeast India. New Delhi, India. ISBN 9789384464752.
- Das, Samir Kumar (1994). ULFA: United Liberation Front of Assam: a Political Analysis. Delhi: Ajanta Publications. ISBN 9788120204072.
- Narahari, N. S. (2002). Security Threats to North-East India: The Socio-ethnic Tensions. New Delhi: Manas Publications. ISBN 9788170491316.
- Tiwary, Arun Kumar (2002). Air Power and Counter Insurgency: A Review : J & K as a Model. New Delhi: Lancer's Books. ISBN 9788170950936.
- Dutta, P. S. (1995). The North-east and the Indian State: Paradoxes of a Periphery. New Delhi: Vikas Pub. House. ISBN 9780706997293.
- Marwah, Ved (1997). Uncivil Wars: Pathology of Terrorism in India. New Delhi: HarperCollins. ISBN 978-817223-251-1.
- Alagappa, Muthiah (2001). Coercion and Governance: The Declining Political Role of the Military in Asia. Stanford, California: Stanford University Press. ISBN 9780804742276.
- Sathyamurthy, T. V. (1994). Social Change and Political Discourse in India: State and nation in the context of social change. Delhi: Oxford University Press. ISBN 9780195631364.
- Behera, Ajay Darshan (2008). Violence, Terrorism, and Human Security in South Asia. Dhaka: Bangladesh Institute of International and Strategic Studies: University Press.
- Hazarika, Sanjoy (1995). Strangers of the Mist: Tales of War and Peace from India's Northeast. New Delhi: Penguin Books India. ISBN 978-0140240528.
- Raghavan, V. R.; Shorey, Anil (2002). By Land and Sea: The Post-independence History of the Punjab Regiment, 1947–1986. Vol. 2. Ramgarh Cantt., Bihar: [Punjab Regimental Centre]. ISBN 9788170623007.
- Ghosh, Subir (2001). Frontier Travails: Northeast, the Politics of a Mess. New Delhi: MacMillan. ISBN 9780333936016.
- Kartha, Tara (1999). Tools of Terror: Light Weapons and India's Security. New Delhi: University of Michigan. p. 257. ISBN 9788186019153.
- States in armed conflict. Uppsala, Sweden: Dept. of Peace and Conflict Research, Uppsala University. 1990.
- Deka, Kanaksen (1994). ULFAR SWADHIN ASOM (in Assamese) (1st ed.). Guwahati: Dispur Print House.
- Medhi, Kunja (1996). Status of Women & Social Change. Guwahati: Women's Studies Research Centre, Gauhati University. OCLC 37580426.
- Ghosh, Srikanta (1997). Indian Democracy Derailed Politics and Politicians. New Delhi: APH Pub. Corp. ISBN 978-81-7024-866-8.
- Das, Samir Kumar (2003). Ethnicity, Nation, and Security, Essays on Northeastern India. New Delhi: South Asian Publishers. ISBN 9788170032700.
- Kumar, Dr. Ashok (2014). Dynamics of global terrorism (1st ed.). New Delhi: K.K. Publications. p. 211. ISBN 9788178441481.
- Baweja, Harinder; Yusufzai, Rahimullah (2002). Most Wanted: Profiles of Terror. New Delhi: Lotus Collection, Roli Books. ISBN 9788174362070.
- Shekhawat, Vibhuti Singh (2007). Assam: from accord to ULFA. New Delhi: Anamika Publishers & Distributors. ISBN 978-81-7975-169-5.
- Datta, Prabhat Kumar (1993). Regionalisation of Indian politics. New Delhi: Sterling. ISBN 978-81-207-1493-9.
- Sinha, S. P. (2007). Lost opportunities: 50 years of insurgency in the North-east and India's response. New Delhi: Lancer Publishers & Distributors. ISBN 9788170621621.
- Khullar, Brigadier Darshan (2014). Pakistan our difficult neighbour and India's Islamic dimensions. New Delhi, India: Vij Books India Private Limited. p. 103. ISBN 978-93-82652-82-3.
- Bhūshaṇa, Candra (2004). Terrorism and Separatism in North-East India. Delhi: Kalpaz Publications. ISBN 978-8178352619.
- Kaur, Simren (2013). Fin Feather and Field. Partridge Publishing. ISBN 978-1-4828-0066-1.
- Ghosh, S. K. (1995). Terrorism, World Under Siege. New Delhi: Ashish Pub. House. ISBN 9788170246657.
- Kiruṣṇā Ān̲ant, Vi (2010). India since independence: making sense of Indian politics. Delhi: Longman. ISBN 978-81-317-7268-3.
- Parliament of India, the Ninth Lok Sabha, 1989–1991: a study. New Delhi: Published for Lok Sabha Secretariat, New Delhi [by] Northern Book Centre. 1992. ISBN 9788172110192.
- Sarkar, Bhaskar (1998). Tackling Insurgency and Terrorism: Blueprint for Action. New Delhi: Vision Books. p. 108. ISBN 9788170942917.
- Kabi, Dr KH; Pattnaik, Dr. S N (2015). Media, Conflict and Peace in Northeast India. New Delhi: Vij Books India Private Limited. ISBN 9789384464448.
- Karim, Afsir (1993). Transnational Terrorism: The Danger in the South. New Delhi; London: Lancer Papers. ISBN 978-1-897829-35-6.
- Verghese, B. G. (1996). India's Northeast Resurgent: Ethnicity, Insurgency, Governance, Development. Delhi: Konark Publishers. ISBN 9788122004557.
- Prakash, Ved (2008). Terrorism in India's north-east: A gathering storm. Delhi: Kalpaz Publications. ISBN 9788178356624.
- Jagmohan (2008). Shaping India's New Destiny. New Delhi: Allied Publishers. ISBN 978-81-8424-330-7.
- Raghavan, V R (2013). Policy Choices in Internal Conflicts: Governing Systems and Outcomes. Vij Books India Private Limited. ISBN 9789382573623.
- Kumar, Arun (1991). The Tenth Round: Story of Indian Elections 1991. Calcutta: Rupa & Co. ISBN 9788171670727.

=== Journals ===
- Baruah, Sanjib (2009). "Separatist Militants and Contentious Politics in Assam, India: The Limits of Counterinsurgency". Asian Survey. 49 (6): 951–974. doi:10.1525/as.2009.49.6.951. ISSN 0004-4687. JSTOR 10.1525/as.2009.49.6.951. Archived from the original on 22 May 2022.
- Baruah, Sanjib (1994). "The State and Separatist Militancy in Assam: Winning a Battle and Losing the War?". Asian Survey. 34 (10): 863–877. doi:10.2307/2644966. ISSN 0004-4687. JSTOR 2644966. Archived from the original on 2 February 2022.
- Gohain, Hiren (2006). "Post-Colonial Trauma?". Economic and Political Weekly. 41 (43/44): 4537. ISSN 0012-9976. JSTOR 4418856. Archived from the original on 22 August 2022.
- "Pakistan defence review". Pakistan Defence Review. 7. Pakistan Army. 1995. OCLC 22834819.
- "Parliamentary debates, House of the People: official report". Parliamentary Debates, House of the People: Official Report. Parliament Secretariat. 2000. ISSN 0445-6769.
- "India Today". India Today. 15. New Delhi: Living Media India Pvt. Limited. 1990. ISSN 0971-4537.
- Das, Samir Kumar (2007), Conflict and Peace in India's Northeast: The Role of Civil Society, Policy Studies, vol. 42, East-West Center, ISBN 978-1-932728-69-9, ISSN 1547-1330, archived from the original on 22 May 2022
- "Faultlines". Faultlines. 8–11. Institute for Conflict Management. 1999. ISSN 0972-1290.
- "Defence Journal". Defence Journal. 7 (1–3). Karachi, Pakistan: Ikram ul-Majeed Sehgal. 1997. OCLC 40335640.
- Social Sciences, Loyola College of (1992). "Loyola Journal of Social Sciences". Loyola Journal of Social Sciences. 6 (1). Thiruvananthapuram: Loyola College of Social Sciences: 15. ISSN 0971-4960.
- "Strategic Analysis". Strategic Analysis. 18 (7–12). New Delhi: Institute for Defense Studies and Analyses. 1995. ISSN 0970-0161.
- "In New Role". Economic and Political Weekly. 28 (6): 193–194. 1993. ISSN 0012-9976. JSTOR 4399352.
- "Keesing's record of world events". Keesing's Record of World Events. 37 (12). London: Longman Reno. 1992. ISSN 0950-6128.
- Ministry of Foreign Affairs, Pakistan (2001). "Foreign Affairs Pakistan". Foreign Affairs Pakistan. 28 (3). Islamabad: Pakistan Ministry of Foreign Affairs: 210.
- Roy, M. N (2001). "The Radical Humanist". The Radical Humanist. 65. Bombay.
- "Documentation on Women's Concerns". Documentation on Women's Concerns. ill. New Delhi: Library and Documentation Centre, All India Association for Christian Higher Education: 36. 1991.
- "Parliamentary debates: official report". Parliamentary Debates: Official Report. 156 (6–10). New Delhi: Council of States Secretariat, Rajya Sabha Secretariat: 75. 1991. ISSN 0537-0167.
