= The New Rules of War =

The New Rules of War: Victory in the Age of Durable Disorder
- Author: Sean McFate
- Subject: Military strategy
- Published: January, 2019
- Publisher: HarperCollins
- Awards: Economist book of the year
- ISBN: 9780062843593
- OCLC: OL28914896MISBN
- Website: https://www.seanmcfate.com/the-new-rules-of-war

The New Rules of War: Victory in the Age of Durable Disorder is a 2019 nonfiction book concerning military strategy. In one reviewer's words, it "criticizes the rigidity of Western strategic thinking and its overreliance on 'traditional' military approaches, its conventional military forces and doctrines, including overspending on technologically advanced platforms".

== Background ==
The author, Sean McFate, was a U.S. Army officer, then after receiving a Ph.D. became a political scientist at the RAND Corporation and a Senior Fellow at the Atlantic Council. He has also worked as a private military contractor.

== Reception ==
A former director of war studies in the Australian Army Research Centre wrote "all military practitioners and defence thinkers should read this book".

A reviewer for Ethics & International Affairs found the author "somewhat dismissive of the laws of armed conflict" but wrote that the book was "a needed corollary to the conventional wisdom" and "an accessible introduction to many issues of war and peace" for those who are not professional soldiers and strategists. Kirkus Reviews found some of its conclusions "controversial" and "carrying ugly implications" but summarized it as "necessary reading for the strategically inclined".

Publishers Weekly said it was a "standout work of military science", and "an authoritative and skillful analysis of the state of war today", and noted the author's use of the term 'durable disorder' (part of the title of a 2012 work by Sanjib Baruah) to characterize world affairs at the time of publication.

The book was selected for the 2019 books of the year list by The Economist.
