= Swaraj India =

Indian registered unrecognised political party

- President: Christina Samy
- Founder: Yogendra Yadav; Prashant Bhushan; Avik Saha
- Founded: 31 July 2016 (9 years ago)
- Headquarters: A – 189, Sector 43, Noida, Uttar Pradesh 201301
- ECI Status: registered unrecognized
- Seats in Lok Sabha: 0/545
- Seats in Haryana Legislative Assembly: 0/90

Website
- www.swarajindia.org

Swaraj India is a registered unrecognized Indian political party that was launched on 2 October 2016. It was formed by Yogendra Yadav and anti-corruption activist Prashant Bhushan. Avik Saha is the National General Secretary of the registered party while Christina Samy is the current National President. On 31 July 2016, Swaraj Abhiyan which formed as a political platform on 14 April 2015, announced the decision to form a political front, Swaraj India.

== Early days ==
On 4 March 2015, Yadav, Bhushan, Anand Kumar and Ajit Jha were removed from the key Political Affairs Committee of Aam Aadmi Party and were later expelled from the party on March 28. Later, Christina Samy, the only woman in the National Executive Committee also resigned. The group decided to start a country-wide Swaraj Yatra and formed a socio-political platform called Swaraj Abhiyan headed by Anand Kumar, an academic from Jawaharlal Nehru University. A group of 100 volunteers met in Delhi and decided to tour all regions of the country and conduct open dialogues with people called Swaraj Samwad. On April 14, a convention was held with over 2000 participants representing over 25 states in Gurugram. After a series of Swaraj Samwad (open dialogues) across the country, a National Convention was held with 400 delegates from all states and Swaraj India was formed on 2 October 2016.

== Ideology ==
The organization claims to transform ideology into reality and to achieve Swaraj in all aspects of life - political, economic, social and cultural. The party's objectives state that: "The Party aims to attain Swaraj for and within our country, our society, our globe and ourselves." Swaraj is rule of the self and freedom from all forms of dominance and freedom for self-realization at every level of human life to achieve democratic governance, sustainable economic development and just society with individual liberty and freedom of thought.

== Elections ==
In 2019, Swaraj India decided to contest 90 seats in the Assembly elections for Haryana. The party was allotted Whistle as its symbol by the Election Commission.
