= Karnataka textbook controversy =

2022 event in India

The Karnataka textbook controversy arose in May–June 2022 after Government of Karnataka made changes to the books used by the government schools in Karnataka. They have been accused of reflecting the political views of BJP, the party in power in the Government of Karnataka.

== 'Burn the chaddi' campaign ==
In June 2022 the Congress students' wing National Students Union of India (NSUI) protested against the "saffronisation" of school textbooks. As a symbolic protest they burnt an underwear outside the Home of Education Minister B. C. Nagesh. They set fire to a pair of khaki shorts similar to the short in the uniform of the Rashtriya Swayamsevak Sangh (RSS) members.

The BJP complained to the police accusing the NSUI activists of trying to burn the minister's house down. Congress leader Siddaramaiah said, "During a protest, we symbolically burnt one underwear - just one underwear. But the police and government made it a big issue and said we are trying to burn the house... So let's start a chaddi-burning campaign," The Congress launched a "burn-the-chaddi" campaign and Siddaramaiah announced that, as a sign of protest against RSS ‘chaddis’ would be burnt.

== See also ==
- Bias in curricula
- Saffronisation
- California textbook controversy over Hindu history
- NCERT textbook controversies
- Pakistani textbooks controversy
