= Rendezvous with Rebels: Journey to Meet India's Most Wanted Men =

2014 book by Rajeev Bhattacharyya

- Author: Rajeev Bhattacharyya
- Language: English
- Subject: Military science
- Genre: Political Science
- Publisher: HarperCollins
- Publication date: 2014
- Pages: 328
- ISBN: 978-93-5136-316-3 Hardcover
- OCLC: 903436428
- LC Class: 2014362210

Rendezvous with Rebels: Journey to Meet India's Most Wanted Men is a non-fiction political science book based on interviews of several militant organizations from North East India. It is written by journalist Rajeev Bhattacharyya and published by HarperCollins in 2014.

== Overview ==
Rajeev Bhattacharyya, a journalist and author of multiple books, walked to Myanmar, stayed there and interviewed Southeast Asia's insurgent group's leaders like S. S. Khaplang, Paresh Baruah, I. K. Songbijit and other leaders of Northeast India.

Bhattacharyya was reportedly detained in Myanmar during his journey for visiting the country without valid documents but freed later. Bhattacharyya, however, refuted the report about his detention through an article in HuffPost.

Bhattacharyya walked on nearly 800 kms on a treacherous path and stayed in the ULFA and NSCN-(K) camps for the interviews. Journalist Sangeeta Barooah Pisharoty interviewed Mr. Bhattacharyya about his journey to conclude in a book, where Bhattacharyya stated that he was never questioned by any Government agency. He stayed covertly in the region of Myanmar for nearly four months and interviewed top rebel leaders of India’s northeast region.

During his journey, Bhattacharyya witnessed that China has begun actively backing the separatist groups of Northeast India after formation of the UNLFW.

== Critical reception ==
Sanjay Kumar from The Diplomat reviewed and wrote "For Beijing, Myanmar is very important. What Bhutan is to India, Myanmar is to China."

Reviewing the book for Frontline, Uddipan Dutta, witnessed that the author had the journey to Burma and back lasted after for three months. Dutta wrote, "Until Bhattacharyya’s interview with Baruah, the ULFA chief had remained an enigma. In fact, even the intelligence agencies had no idea how he looked at that time as only three photographs of Baruah had appeared in the media at regular intervals."

Gaurav Choudhury reviewing for Hindustan Times stated that he author also spends time with S. S. Khaplang, the Naga chief and godfather of the region, who has firmed up an alliance with rebel outfits from Manipur and Assam.

Gargi Gupta of DNA India wrote in her review, "It was a top-secret assignment, a cloak and dagger affair as the journalists had to hoodwink the Indian army, hot on Baruah's heel."

The Daily Star stated that the book covered the antecedents of armed movements in northeast till 2011 – mostly through firsthand accounts.
