= In the Name of the Nation =

Political Science Book

- Author: Sanjib Baruah
- Subject: Northeast India
- Genre: Political Science
- Publisher: Stanford University Press
- Publication date: 2020
- Pages: 296
- Awards: 2021 ICAS Book Prize
- ISBN: 9781503610705 Hardcover

In the Name of the Nation: India and its Northeast is a non-fiction political science book about Assam. It is written by professor and commentator Sanjib Baruah and published by Stanford University Press in 2020.

== Overview ==
Sanjib Baruah, a Professor of Political Studies at Bard College and commentator on Northeast India, examines the political and socioeconomic history of Assam. Parvin Sultana writes for The Wire, "The chapters deal with issues like how the region experienced partition, migration, insurgency, counter-insurgency."

In a review for H-Net, Berenice Guyot-Rechard describes the chapters as "the dynamics of region-building (chapter 1), the vexed issue of citizenship and belonging (chapter 2), the politics of development (chapter 3), the Naga conflict (chapter 4), and the entrenchment of the "security state" (chapters 5 and 6)." Unmilan Kalita writes in a review for the South Asia Journal that the final chapter of the book "champions a robust federal policy and asks the questions that are often left unanswered", including questions related to policy and regional control over resources.

== Background and themes ==
Samir Sharma writes in Studies in Indian Politics, "This book, in a way, completes Baruah's trilogy on the region, after India Against Itself (1999) and Durable Disorder (2005)." Parvin Sultana writes for The Wire, "Written almost after two decades of the widely read India Against Itself (1999), this book revisits the over-arching issues that continue to dominate the political discourse of the region." Rashi Bhargava writes for The Telegraph, "Baruah has engaged with themes of State, nation, nationalism, sub/ethno-nationalism, nation-building, sovereignty, democracy and citizenship in the context of Northeast India since India Against Itself: Assam and the Politics of Nationality, one of his well-known works."

== Critical reception ==
Parvin Sultana writes in a review for The Wire, "The book deals with how politics of migration have often segregated communities" and "ends on the important note that citizenship policies should stop being exclusionary." In a review for The Telegraph, Rashi Bhargava writes, "[Baruah] argues that the politics of ideas, representations and, consequently, exclusion has always been a strong point of contention in the writings on and from the Northeast. This may not seem like a new theme for someone who has been following Baruah’s intellectual and academic trajectory but the book is a reminder that some issues need constant revisiting, more so in the times we live in." Mahesh Rangarajan writes in a review for The Indian Express, "This work walks the fine line between being sensitive to group identity and being deeply attentive to issues of individual choice and freedom – rare in practice, but well worth the effort."

In a review for H-Net, Berenice Guyot-Rechard writes, "What gives the book its peculiar power is the presence throughout of four interlocking strands: the rejection of "insurgency" as a frame to understand Northeast Indian politics; the characterization of development as an ideology and practice rooted in unequal power relations; the entwined dynamics of incorporation and othering; and finally, the contested, protean nature of the subaltern in Northeast India." Andrew J. Nathan writes in a capsule review for Foreign Affairs, "Baruah's intimate history and ethnography shows how neglect, corruption, uneven development, and repression - and recently the rise of Hindu nationalism at the federal level - have intensified the Northeast's alienation from the rest of the country."

Ashutosh Varshney writes in Perspectives on Politics, "his principal argument is that, despite regular elections, the region has mostly seen a painful face of Indian democracy - primarily because Delhi has made democracy subservient to national security, generating huge deficits in the realm of civil rights and freedoms". In Studies in Indian Politics, Samir Sharma writes, "An important and timely contribution of this book is the linking of (non)democratic practices in the Northeast region to that of citizenship. Given the contentions over the Citizenship Amendment Act and National Register of Citizens in the region, changing the frame of reference for analysing the Northeast region from ethnicity alone to include citizenship studies and borderland studies is one of the strengths of the book."

However, reviewers from scholars of the northeastern region were critical of the book. Thongkholal Haokip argues that "While discussing “India’s Northeast Policy” the author seems to ignore the existing literature, despite extensive reference to published works while dealing with other topics". " Roluahpuia views that "Despite the rich empirical details and theoretical sophistication of this book, it largely comes across as a restatement of Baruah’s earlier work, reiterating arguments that he has made for decades now". "

== Awards ==
- 2021 ICAS Book Prize, Most Accessible and Captivating Work for the Non-Specialist Reader Accolade, from the International Convention of Asia Scholars
