= National Students' Union of India =

Indian National Congress student wing

- NSUI Logo
- Abbreviation: NSUI
- Formation: 9 April 1971; 55 years ago
- Type: Student wing
- Legal status: Active
- Headquarters: 5, Raisina Road, New Delhi
- Region served: India
- Members: 5.5 million
- Chairperson: Mallikarjun Kharge
- President: Vinod Jakhar
- AICC Incharge: Kanhaiya Kumar
- National Media Chairman: Ravi Pandey
- Website: nsui.info

The National Students' Union of India (NSUI) is the student wing of the Indian National Congress. It was established on 9 April 1971, founded by Indira Gandhi after merging the Kerala Students' Union and the West Bengal Students' Union to form a national students' organisation. Vinod Jakhar is the current National President of NSUI. With 4 million members and a presence in 15,000 colleges across the country, NSUI is a centre-left student union.

== Membership ==
In order to become a member of NSUI, one must be under 27 years of age, must be a student, must be a citizen of India, must not be part of any other political organization and must not have been convicted of any criminal activity in the past. NSUI categorizes its members into "Primary Members" and "Active Members". One can become member by filling online membership form.

== Campaigns ==
=== Hum Badlenge Campaign ===
The "Hum Badlenge" Campaign by NSUI was launched in November 2024 under which the organization has invited passionate students to become Campus Ambassadors for their universities. Students can apply online through Hum Badlenge website and this nationwide initiative aims to identify ambassadors in 250+ universities across India.

As part of the campaign, ambassadors will:

- Raise important issues on their campuses.
- Receive training and support from the Congress Party and NSUI.

This program is designed for students who are committed to social justice, secularism, gender equality, and the Nehruvian-Gandhian legacy.

=== 'Burn the chaddi' campaign ===
In June 2022 during the Karnataka textbook controversy the Congress students' wing NSUI (National Students Union of India) protested against the saffronisation of school textbooks. As a symbolic protest they burnt an underwear outside the Home of Education Minister BC Nagesh. They set fire to a pair of khaki shorts similar to the shorts in the uniform of the Rashtriya Swayamsevak Sangh (RSS) members.

The BJP complained to the police accusing the NSUI activists of trying to burn the minister's house down. Siddaramaiah said, "During a protest, we symbolically burnt one underwear - just one underwear. But the police and government made it a big issue and said we are trying to burn the house... So let's start a chaddi-burning campaign,". The Congress launched a "burn-the-chaddi" campaign and Siddaramaiah announced that, as a sign of protest against RSS ‘chaddis’ would be burnt.

== Achievements ==
Victory in Delhi University Students' Union (DUSU) Elections: NSUI won DUSU elections in 2024. Ronak Khatri was elected as the President and Lokesh Choudhary was elected as the Joint Secretary.

Movements Led by NSUI: NSUI has consistently been at the forefront of student movements, addressing critical issues, including:

1. Paper Leak, Examination Irregularities and Scams: Exposing scams like paper leaks in NEET, UGC NET, UPPCS RO/ARO, UP Police recruitment, and other exams.
2. Fee Hikes: Protesting against arbitrary increases in tuition and examination fees to ensure education remains affordable.
3. Reservation for OBC, SC, and ST Students: Advocating for proper implementation of reservation policies in educational institutions.
4. Women's Safety: Organizing campaigns and protests to demand safer campuses and public spaces for women.
5. Fund Cuts in Scholarships and Education Budgets: Opposing reductions in funding for scholarships and education, ensuring equitable access for students from marginalized communities.

== Protests and Movements ==
NEET Protest: In response to alleged irregularities in the NEET-UG 2024 exam, members of the National Students' Union of India (NSUI) protested by storming the National Testing Agency (NTA) office in Delhi, locking the building and demanding the agency's shutdown. The protest was sparked by concerns over paper leaks and the unusual result of 67 students scoring a perfect 720. Following the protest, the Delhi Police filed charges against the National President of NSUI Varun Choudhary and other members. Similar protests were then held in different cities across India. The controversy led to petitions and a Supreme Court ruling for a re-test for over 1,500 students. The Ministry of Education formed a committee to review the exam process, while the CBI investigates the alleged irregularities. On 15 July 2024, the National Students' Union of India (NSUI) staged a massive protest in Bhopal against the NEET paper leak, the nursing scam, and the controversial Agnipath scheme.

Parliament March: On 5 December 2024, members of the National Students' Union of India (NSUI), were stopped by Delhi Police while marching towards Indian Parliament. The protest aimed to highlight critical issues such as unemployment, delays in recruitment, and cuts in student scholarships and demanded fair recruitment processes, transparency in hiring, and the restoration of scholarships, particularly for marginalized communities. The protest condemned government policies that adversely affected students, particularly those from SC, ST, and OBC backgrounds. NSUI President Varun Choudhary and around 100 members were detained by Delhi Police.

== National Presidents ==
S.no	President	Period		Home State
1	Rangarajan Kumaramangalam	1971	1974	Tamil Nadu
2	Mohan Gopal	1974	1976	Kerala
3	Geetanjali Maken	1976	1977	Delhi
4	K. K. Sharma	1977	1981	Uttar Pradesh
5	Subhash Chaudhary	1981	1982	Haryana
6	Ramesh Chennithala	1982	1984	Kerala
7	Mukul Wasnik	1984	1986	Maharashtra
8	Manish Tewari	1986	1993	Punjab
9	Saleem Ahmed	1993	1997	Karnataka
10	Alka Lamba	1997	1999	Delhi
11	Meenakshi Natarajan	1999	2003	Madhya Pradesh
12	Ashok Tanwar	2003	2005	Haryana
13	Nadeem Javed	2005	2008	Uttar Pradesh
14	Hibi Eden	2008	2012	Kerala
15	Rohit Chaudhary	2012	2014	Delhi
16	Roji M John	2014	2016	Kerala
17	Amrita Dhawan	2016	2017	Delhi
18	Fairoz Khan	2017	2018	Jammu and Kashmir
19	Neeraj Kundan	2019	2024	Jammu and Kashmir
20	Varun Choudhary	2024	2026	Delhi
21	Vinod Jakhar	2026	Incumbent	Rajasthan

== Current State Presidents ==
S.no	State	President
1	Andhra Pradesh	Naga Madhu Yadav
2	Arunachal Pradesh	Saruk Yura
3	Assam	Kaushik Kashyap
4	Bihar	Jaishankar Prasad
5	Chhattisgarh	Neeraj Pandey
6	Goa	Naushad Chowdhari
7	Gujarat	Narendra Solanki
8	Haryana	Avinash Yadav
9	Himachal Pradesh	Tony Thakur
10	Jharkhand	Binay Oraon
11	Karnataka	Kirthi Ganesh
12	Keralam	Aloshious Xavier
13	Madhya Pradesh	Ashutosh Choksey
14	Maharashtra	Sagar Salunke
15	Manipur	Joyson K. H.
16	Meghalaya	Mewan P. Pariat
17	Mizoram	R. B. Lalmalsawma
18	Nagaland	X. Chophika Sumi
19	Odisha	Bibhuti Bhushan Mohapatra
20	Punjab	Isherpreet Singh Sidhu
21	Rajasthan	Vacant
22	Sikkim	Jatin Farswal
23	Tamil Nadu	M. Chinnathambi
24	Telangana	Yadavalli Venkata Swamy
25	Tripura	Swarup Kumar Sil
26	Uttarakhand	Vikas Negi
27	Uttar Pradesh	Rohit Rana (West); Anas Rahman (Central); Rishabh Pandey (East)
28	West Bengal	Priyanka Choudhury
29	Andaman and Nicobar Islands	M. A. Sajid
30	Chandigarh	
31	Dadra Nagar Haveli	
32	Daman and Diu	
33	Delhi	Ashish Lamba
34	Jammu and Kashmir	Ajay Lakhotra
35	Ladakh	
36	Lakshadweep	Ajas Akber Puthiya Illam
37	Mumbai	Pradyum Yadav
38	Puducherry	Dr. Harsha Vardhan S.

== Controversies ==
In November 2013, two members of the NSUI were injured by police as they attempted to submit a memorandum to the district magistrate. In late November, the NSUI filed a complain with the police against Madhu Kishwar, a writer who ousted the journalist that had been allegedly sexually assaulted by Tarun Tejpal.

== See also ==
- All India Students' Federation
- Students' Federation of India
- All India Students' Association
- Akhil Bharatiya Vidyarthi Parishad
- Indian National Congress
- Indian Youth Congress
- Lists of political parties
