= Singpho =

Singpho may refer to:

- Singpho people, also known as the Jingpo people, of Myanmar and India
- Singpho dialect, a dialect of the Jingpho language, their Sino-Tibetan language

== See also ==
- Jingpo (disambiguation)
