= Jingpo =

Jingpo may refer to:

- Jingpo people, also spelled Jingpho, Jinghpaw, Singpho, and Chingp'o, a people of Myanmar and India
  - Jingpo language, their Sino-Tibetan language
- Jingpo Lake, in Heilongjiang, China

== See also ==
- Singpho (disambiguation)
- Kachin (disambiguation)
