= Anand Kumar (sociologist) =

Indian politician and Educationist

- Born: 15 September 1950 (age 76); Varanasi
- Education: Banaras Hindu University (M.A.), Jawaharlal Nehru University (M.Phil), University of Chicago (PhD)

Anand Kumar is a retired professor of sociology at Jawaharlal Nehru University, an ex-member of the Aam Aadmi Party, he contested for Lok Sabha (India's lower house of parliament) from the North East Delhi parliamentary constituency in the 2014 Indian general election but lost to BJP candidate Manoj Tiwari.

== Academic career ==
Kumar received an MA in Sociology at the Banaras Hindu University (BHU), Varanasi, 1972; an MPhil. in Sociology at the Jawaharlal Nehru University (JNU), New Delhi, 1975; and a PhD in Sociologists at the University of Chicago, 1986. He was a lecturer in Sociology at BHU from 1979 to 1989, an Associate Professor of Sociology at JNU from 1990 to 1998, and has been a Professor of Sociology at JNU since 1998. Also taught as India Chair in Germany (Albert Ludwig University, Freiburg), GSP Scholar at Humboldt University (Berlin, Germany), and was Fulbright Visiting Scholar at Tufts University from January to May 2013. International Faculty at Innsbruck University (Austria), GSP faculty at FLACSO (Buenos Aires, Argentina), Visiting professor at NEHU (Shillong) and Kashmir University (Srinagar).

== Political career ==
Kumar was a National Executive Committee member of the Aam Aadmi Party (AAP). He contested on AAP ticket the Indian Lok Sabha elections of 2014 from the North East Delhi parliamentary constituency and came 2nd. Later on he was expelled from AAP for "Anti-Party activities" than finally along with Yogendra Yadav, Prashant Bhushan, Ajit Jha formed a new political organization called Swaraj Abhiyan and currently is a National convenor of Swaraj Abhiyan.

== Bibliography ==
- Kumar, Anand, ed. (2014), Political Sociology of India, Sage Readings in Indian Sociology, Volume 8, SAGE Publications, ISBN 978-81-321-1785-8
- Kumar, Anand (16 February 2013), "A Constructive Challenge to the Political Class: The Aam Aadmi's Party" (PDF), Economic and Political Weekly, XLVIII (7), archived from the original (PDF) on 23 August 2015
- Kumar, Anand (2 October 2010), "Understanding Lohia's Political Sociology: Intersectionality of Caste, Class, Gender and Language", Economic and Political Weekly, XLV (40)
- Kumar, Anand (1989), State and Society in India: A Study of the State's Agenda- Making, 1917-1977, Radiant Publishers, ISBN 978-81-7027-120-8
- Kumar, Anand (1985), Political Sociology of Peripheral Capitalism: Making of the State's Agenda in Colonial and Post-colonial India, University of Chicago, Department of Sociology, PhD Thesis
