= Rajeev Bhattacharyya =

Indian journalist and author

- Born: Guwahati, India
- Occupations: Journalist, author
- Known for: ULFA: The Mirage of Dawn; Rendezvous with Rebels

Rajeev Bhattacharyya is an Indian journalist and author from Guwahati, Assam. He has worked as journalist at The Telegraph, The Indian Express, The Times of India and Times Now. His works focus on Northeast India and Myanmar, Bhutan, China and Bangladesh. Born in Guwahati, Bhattacharyya completed his Post-graduation from Delhi University. He walked nearly 800 kilometers and stayed in the United Liberation Front of Asom and National Socialist Council of Nagaland camps in Myanmar to interview northeastern insurgent leaders. Journalist Sangeeta Barooah Pisharoty interviewed Bhattacharyya about his journey to conclude in a book, in which Bhattacharyya stated that he was never questioned by any government agency.

== Books ==
- Rendezvous with Rebels: Journey to Meet India's Most Wanted Men ISBN 978-93-5136-316-3
- ULFA: The Mirage of Dawn ISBN 978-93-5699-308-2
- Lens and the Guerrilla: Insurgency in India's Northeast ISBN 978-817-0494-515
- Paresh Baruar Sandhanat (in Assamese) ISBN 978-93-244-0398-8
