= Suhas Palshikar (academic) =

Indian political scientist

Suhas Palshikar is an Indian academic and social and political scientist. He taught political science at Savitribai Phule Pune University, Pune, and is chief editor of Studies in Indian Politics.

== Career ==
He taught at the S P College, Pune for eleven years from 1978 to 1989. He is co director of Lokniti, CSDS and was Professor in the Department of Politics and Public Administration at the Savitribai Phule Pune University from 1989 to 2016. He is also the Chief Editor of the journal Studies in Indian Politics. He specialised in the areas of Political Process in India, Politics of Maharashtra, Political Sociology of Democracy.

== Books ==
1. Rajkaran Jidnyasa, 2025, Sadhana, Pune. 2. The Last Fortress of Congress Dominance: Maharashtra since the 1990s, (with Rajeshwari Deshpande), 2021, Sage, New Delhi. 3. Politics and Society Between Elections: Public Opinion in India's States (e-book), co-edited with Siddharth Swaminathan, December 2020, Routledge, London. 4. Reading India: Selections from Economic and Political Weekly, Vol. 3: 191-2017; Edited by Pulapre Balakrishnan, Suhas Palshikar and Nandini Sundar, 2019, Orient Blackswan, Hyderabad. 5. Indian Democracy, 2017, OISI Series, OUP, New Delhi. 6. Electoral Politics in India: Resurgence of Bharatiya Janata Party, London & New York, Routledge, 2017 (South Asia Edition), Editors: Suhas Palshikar, Sanjay Kumar & Sanjay Lodha 7. Party Competition in Indian States: Electoral Politics in Post-Congress Polity, Suhas Palshikar, K.C. Suri and Yogendra Yadav (eds.), 2014, New Delhi, OUP. 8. Desh-Pradesh: Pradeshik Rajakaranachya Badalatya Disha, 2014 (2015; 2nd Edition), Pune, Unique Academy. 9. Raajakaaranaach Taaleband: Bharatiy Lokashahichi Vaatachaal, 2013, Pune, Sadhana. 10. Lokshahi: Arth ani Vyavahar, Dec. 2010, (ed. With Rajendra Vora), Marathi Translation by Chitra Lele, Pune, Diamond. 11. Lokshahi Zindabad, August 2010, (ed. with Yogendra Yadav and Peter R. De Souza), Pune, Samakaaleen Prakashan. 12. Bharatatil Pradeshik Pakshanche Rajkaran, 2009, (ed.), Pune, Sadhana. 13. State of Democracy in South Asia, 2008, with Yogendra Yadav, Peter de Souza, et al, New Delhi, OUP. 14. Maharashtratil Sattasangharsh, 2007, (Edited with Suhas Kulkarni), Pune, Samakaaleen Prakashan. 15. Jamatwad, Dharmanirapekshata ani Lokshahi, 2006, Pune, Pratima. 16. Indian Democracy: Meanings and Practices, 2004, New Delhi, Sage, (co-edited with Rajendra Vora). 17. Journal of Indian School of Political Economy, 2003; Vol. 15, Nos. 1 & 2, Special Issue on Electoral Politics in Indian States, Guest edited with Yogendra Yadav. 18. Samakaleen Bharatiya Rajkaran, 2004, Pune, Pratima Prakashan. 19. Maharashtrache Rajakaran: Rajakiy Prakriyeche Sthanik Sandarbh,, 2004, Pune, Pratima Prakashan, (co-edited with Nitin Birmal) 2nd edition: 2007; 3rd edition: 2009. 20. Jat ani Maharashtratil Sattakaran, 1998, Pune. Sugava, (2nd edition, 2003). 21. Shiv Sena: Nim-fascist Mohinividyecha Prayog, (booklet in Marathi), 1996, Satara, Ambedkar Academy. 22. Maharashtratil Sattantar, 1996, co-author, Bombay, Granthali. 23. Satyagrahi Samajvad: Acharya Javdekar Nivadak Lekh Sangraha, 1994, Bombay, Sahitya Sanskriti Mandal, Govt. of Maharashtra. 24. Ambedkaranche Hindukaran, (booklet in Marathi) 1994, Satara, Ambedkar Academy. New Edition: 2019, Hariti, Pune 25. Ambedkaranchya Vicharacha Ashay, (booklet in Marathi), 1991, Ichalkaranji, Samajvadi Prabodhini. 26. Rajyashastra Kosh, (An encyclopaedic dictionary of Politics), 1987, Marathi, (Co-editor and author), Pune, Dastane Ramchandra Co.
