= V. R. Raghavan =

Indian Army officer

Lieutenant General Vasantha R. Raghavan PVSM UYSM AVSM
- Military career
- Allegiance: India
- Branch: Indian Army
- Rank: Lieutenant General
- Unit: Punjab Regiment

Lt. Gen. (Retd.) Vasantha R. Raghavan is an Indian security consultant and former military general. He served in the Indian Army for 37 years, retiring as the director general of military operations in 1994. After retiring from the army, he has written several books and is currently the director of the Delhi Policy Group and president of the Centre for Security Analysis in Chennai.

== Military career ==
Raghavan was commissioned in the Punjab Regiment in 1957. He graduated in 1968 from the Royal Military College of Science and the Army Staff College in the UK. He was the commanding general in the Siachen and Kargil sectors during some of the intense combat actions in the area. He was closely involved in the formulation of the Sino-Indian accord on maintaining peace on the borders and in the series of negotiations with Pakistan on the Siachen dispute. As director general of military operations, he was closely involved in strategic planning and field force management of the army. He was awarded the PVSM, UYSM, and AVSM honours by the Government of India.

== Later activities and security advocacy ==
Raghavan was a member of the independent Weapons of Mass Destruction Commission, set up at the initiative of the Swedish Government and headed by Hans Blix. The Commission released a report, entitled "Weapons of Terror: Freeing the World of Nuclear, Biological and Chemical Arms" in 2006, which proposed that nuclear, chemical, and biological weapons be outlawed and discussed the options for achieving this goal.

He was also a member of the Indian Government's Review Committee for the Armed Forces (Special Powers) Act, which had been opposed in Manipur and other parts of North-East India. Although the government has not published the committee's 2005 report, it was reported that the panel recommended that the act be repealed. Raghavan has argued that security should be viewed in terms of human security in societal, environmental, economic, and political terms, instead of the narrow military perspective.

== Publications ==
Raghavan has written four books since retiring from military service:

- By the Land and Sea: A History of the Punjab Regiment
- India’s Need for Strategic Balance
- Infantry in India
- Siachen: Conflict Without End

He has also edited several books:

- Internal Conflicts in Myanmar
- Nuclear Disarmament - India-EU Perspective
- Internal Conflicts in Nepal- Transnational Consequences
- The Naxal Threat: Causes, State Responses and Consequence
- Conflict in Sri Lanka: Internal and External Consequences
- Conflicts in the Northeast: Internal and External Effects (jointly edited with Sanjoy Hazarika)
- Jammu and Kashmir - Impact on Polity, Society and Economy
- Post Conflict Sri Lanka - Rebuilding of Society

He has also edited more than a dozen other books and written numerous articles on strategic issues relating to India's security.

== See also ==
- Sumdorong Chu standoff
- Events leading to the Sino-Indian War
- Kargil War
- Origins of the Sino-Indian border dispute
- Sino-Indian War
- Sino-Indian relations
