= Studies in Indian Politics =

- Discipline: Political science
- Language: English
- Edited by: Suhas Palshikar

Publication details
- History: 2013-present
- Publisher: SAGE Publishing on behalf of the Centre for the Study of Developing Societies
- Frequency: Semiannual
- Impact factor: 0.5 (2022)

Standard abbreviations
- ISO 4: Stud. Indian Politics

Indexing
- ISSN: 2321-0230 (print); 2321-7472 (web)
- OCLC no.: 869153870

Links
- Journal homepage; Online access; Online archive

Studies in Indian Politics is a biannual peer-reviewed academic journal. It covers a wide variety of sub-fields in Indian politics, such as political ideas and thought in India, political institutions and processes, Indian democracy, India in world affairs, public policies, and politics in a comparative perspective particularly with reference to the global south and South Asia. It is published by SAGE Publishing in association with Lokniti, Centre for the Study of Developing Societies.

== Abstracting and indexing ==
The journal is abstracted and indexed in Scopus and the Emerging Sources Citation Index. According to the Journal Citation Reports, the journal has a 2022 impact factor of 0.5.
