= Yogendra Yadav =

Indian psephologist, activist and politician

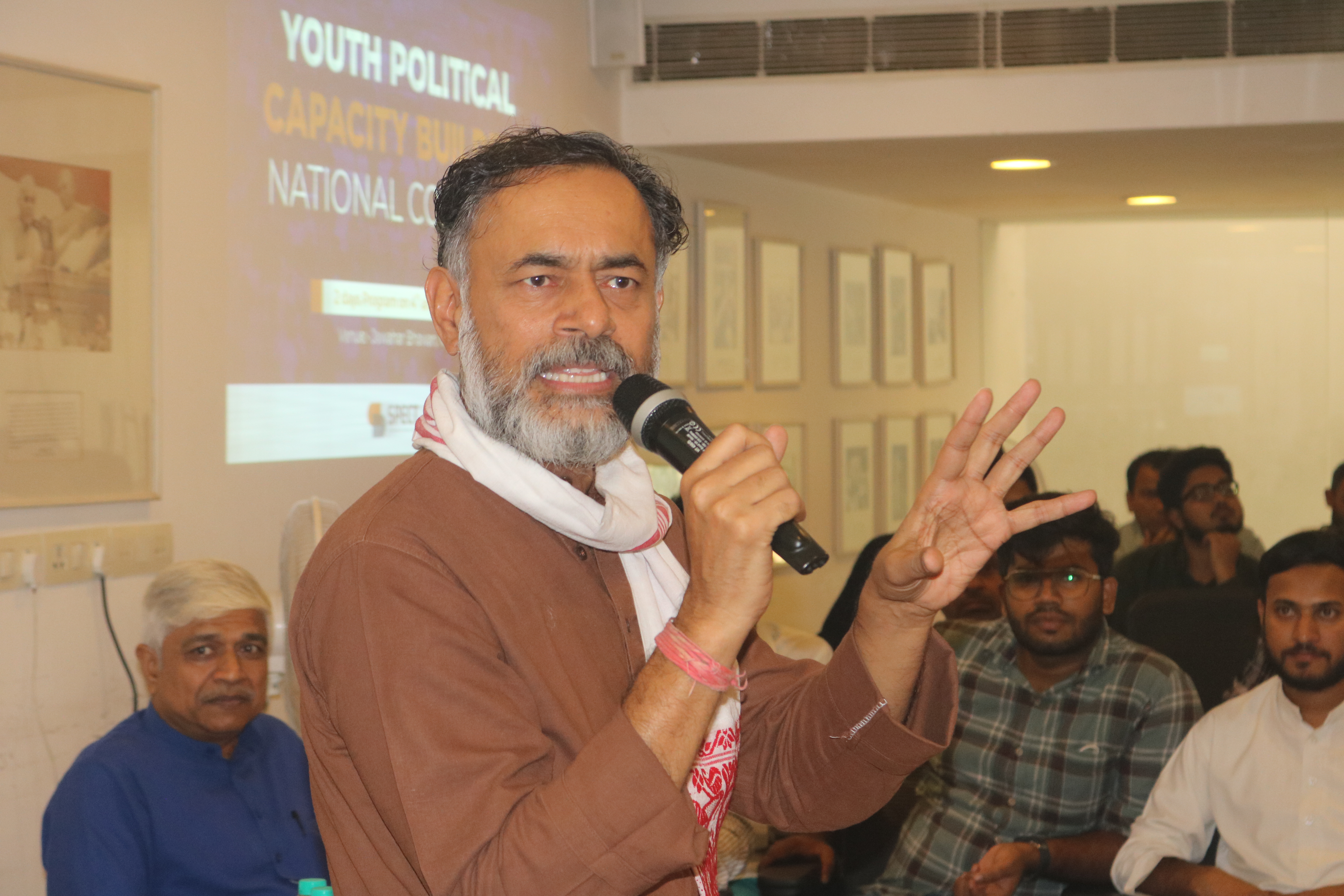
- Yadav in 2024
- Born: Salim Yadav; 5 September 1963 (age 63); Saharanwas, Punjab, India
- Education: Rajasthan University (BA); Jawaharlal Nehru University (MA); Panjab University (MPhil)
- Occupations: Psephologist, writer, activist, politician
- Political party: Swaraj India (2016-present); Aam Aadmi Party (2012-2015)
- Spouse: Madhulika Banerjee
- Website: Yogendra Yadav on X

Yogendra Yadav (born Salim Yadav; 5 September 1963) is an Indian activist, psephologist and politician whose primary interests are in the political and social sciences. He was a Senior Fellow at the Centre for the Study of Developing Societies (CSDS), Delhi from 2004 to 2016. He is a former member of University Grants Commission (UGC) and National Advisory Council on the Right to Education Act (NAC-RTE) constituted by Ministry of Human Resources and Development, Govt of India, in 2010. He was a member of the National Executive of the Aam Aadmi Party until 2015.

Yadav is a founding member of Swaraj Abhiyan and Jai Kisan Andolan. He was the founding National President of Swaraj India, a registered political party. He is also the National Convener of Bharat Jodo Abhiyan.

== Early life ==
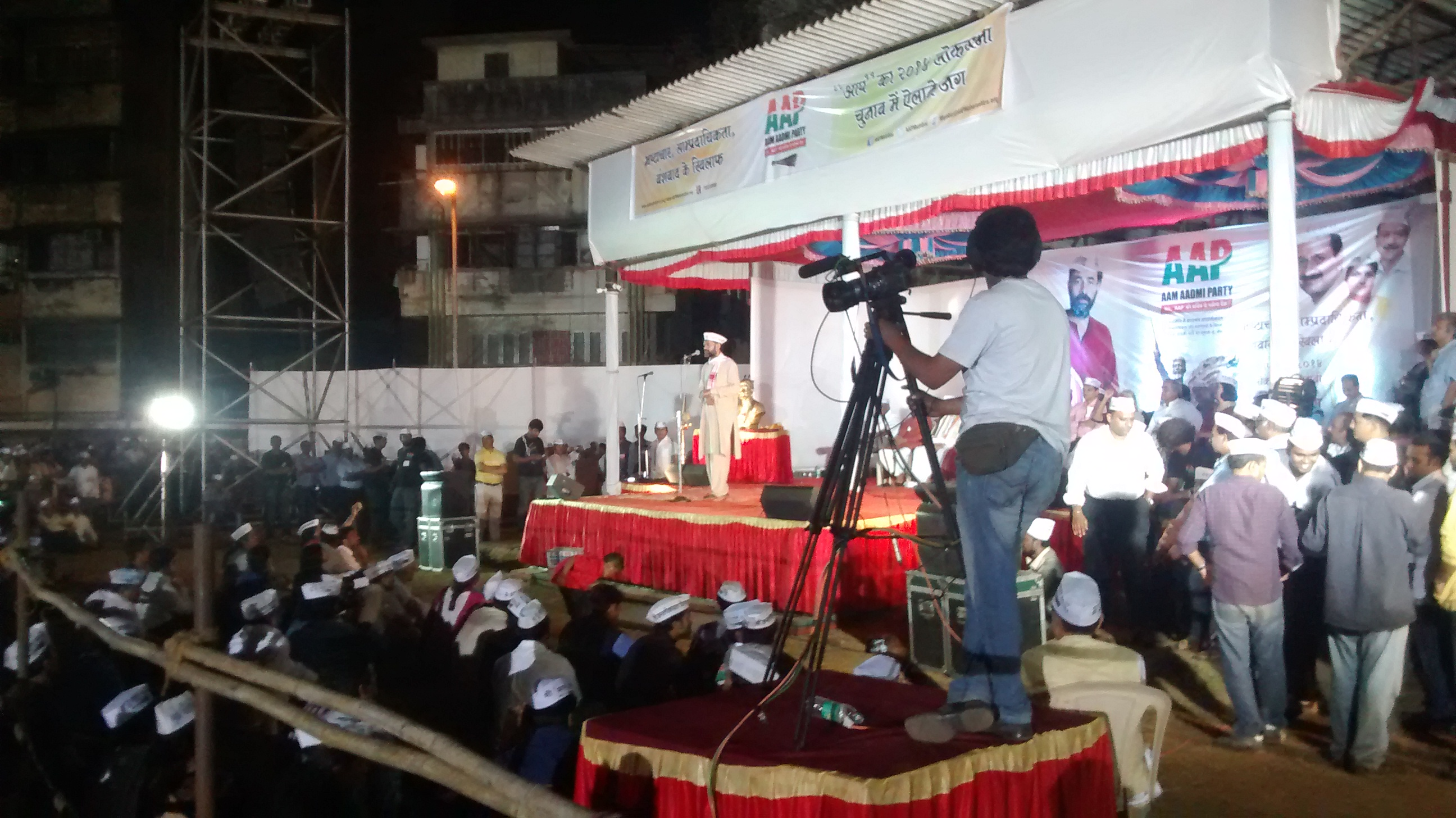
Yogendra Yadav addressing a rally in Mumbai.

Yogendra Yadav's father was a professor of economics and his paternal grandfather was a teacher. His wife, Madhulika Banerjee, is a professor at the University of Delhi. His childhood name was Salim, which is commonly associated with people of the Muslim faith. It was changed to Yogendra when he was aged five because he was being mocked by children at school. Yadav says that his original name, and its continued usage among family members and friends, reflects a familial response to the murder of his grandfather in a communal riot in 1936.

== Academics and research ==
Before joining CSDS, he was an assistant professor of Political Science at Panjab University, Chandigarh (1985-1993). Between 1995–2002, Yadav was the founder-convenor of the Lokniti network. He was also founder-director of the CSDS Lokniti research programme on comparative democracy between 1997 and 2003. Since 1996, he has been a psephologist and political commentator on a number of television channels in India including Doordarshan, NDTV and CNN-IBN.

Yadav was appointed as a member of the National Advisory Council for the implementation of the Right to Education Act in 2010. He was appointed a Senior Fellow at the Centre for the Study of Developing Societies in 2004.

== Politics ==
In 2011, Yadav supported the general aims of, and spoke publicly at events, during the nationwide anti-corruption protests and later joined the Aam Aadmi Party (AAP), formed by anti-corruption activists. Yadav served as a member of the National Executive of the party. His involvement with the AAP was perceived as creating a conflict of interest with his July 2011 appointment as a member of the University Grants Commission, resulting in the Ministry of Human Resource Development ejecting him from the latter role in September 2013. Yadav had argued that there was no conflict.

Yadav contested the 2014 Indian general elections from Gurgaon constituency as an AAP candidate. He came fourth and lost his deposit.

On 4 March 2015, Yadav was voted out of AAP's Political Affairs Committee (PAC). Subsequently, on 28 March, he was expelled from the party's National Executive for alleged "anti-party activities". In April, he was expelled from the party. Yadav denied being involved in anti-party activities and stated that he was victimised for challenging "dictatorial ways" of the party's chief Arvind Kejriwal.

Together with Prashant Bhushan, Anand Kumar (sociologist) and Ajit Jha, Yadav has formed a new political organisation called Swaraj Abhiyan. Yogendra Yadav urged Delhi voters to choose NOTA in 2019 Indian general election as no political parties in Delhi have fulfilled their promises. He termed NOTA as “No Till an Alternative”.

Yadav is a member of Samyukt Kisan Morcha coordination committee, which spearheaded the 2020–2021 Indian farmers' protest. In 2022, Yogendra Yadav joined Rahul Gandhi-led Bharat Jodo Yatra and described the Yatra as a Dakshinayana movement of India, where the influences of the South are carried to the North.

== Views on Special Intensive Revision (SIR) ==
Yadav has been a petitioner in the Supreme Court challenging the Election Commission's Special Intensive Revision (SIR) of electoral rolls.

- April 2026 – West Bengal SIR: Yadav wrote that "The SIR in West Bengal was a Special Impediment Removal exercise designed by the BJP, executed by the ECI and certified by the Supreme Court. Carefully designed to remove the demographic impediment faced by the BJP in its desperate bid to conquer Bengal".
- June 2026 – Supreme Court verdict: After the Supreme Court upheld SIR, Yadav compared the judgment to Emergency-era case, stating "The Supreme Court judgment in the ADR case is to our times what the ADM Jabalpur case was to the Emergency" and that it signaled that "The doors of the Supreme Court were shut". He argued the order has "declined to name those bearing its costs, declined to reckon with who was excluded". He later wrote that the order has laid ground for "eventual deletion of nearly 10 crore voters through the country without any amendment in the Constitution, law or even rules".
- September–October 2026 – Protests: Yadav participated in 'People Against SIR' protests in Delhi. On 26 September 2026, he was among over 60 protesters detained near Jantar Mantar while protesting against SIR and demanding resignation of Chief Election Commissioner Gyanesh Kumar. He said "The nexus between Gyanesh Kumar and the BJP has become apparent... they may be able to stop the impeachment in the Lok Sabha and Rajya Sabha, but now the people will bring impeachment to the streets".

On 23 October 2026, Yadav again joined a march of students, farmers and civil society groups against SIR in Central Delhi.

- October 2026: Yadav wrote that "If the regime has decided not to yield an inch, the protesters have to find a mechanism to coordinate their efforts" and called for unity among opposition and civil society against SIR.

== Political positions ==
=== Anti-English and Hindi as the medium of instruction ===
He supports removing English language as a medium of teaching from higher education while opposing replacing it with Hindi. He stated "Bringing Hindi as a substitute for English is as barbaric to me as the dominance of English today." He supports higher education through mother tongues.

== Awards and honours ==
In 2008, Yadav received the Malcolm Adiseshiah Award for Development Studies. In 2009, he received the Global South Solidarity Award by the International Political Science Association.

== Publications ==
Yadav has published many articles and books. He was an editor and advisor for various publications, such as the European Journal of Political Research, Samayik Varta and the Hindi-language social science anthologies titled Lokchhintan and Lokchintak Granthamala.

=== Books ===
- Making Sense of Indian Democracy: Theory as Practice (2020)
- State of Democracy in South Asia (2008) co-authored and co-edited (with Sandeep Shastri and K C Suri).
- Electoral Politics in Indian States (2009).
- Democracy in Multi-national Societies (2010) co-authored with Alfred Stepan and Juan Linz.
- Democratic Politics - 1 (2006) Chief Advisor with Suhas Palshikar, published by NCERT.
- Democratic Politics - 2 (2006) Chief Advisor with Suhas Palshikar, published by NCERT.
- Modiraj Main Kisan, Double Aamad, ya Double Aafat (2018) on agrarian crisis under the Modi government

=== Research papers ===
- Redesigning Affirmative Action : Castes and Benefits in Higher Education (with Satish Deshpande).
