= ULFA: The Mirage of Dawn =

Political Science Book

- Author: Rajeev Bhattacharyya
- Subject: ULFA & Assam
- Genre: Political Science
- Publisher: HarperCollins
- Publication date: 2023
- Pages: 400
- ISBN: 978-93-5699-308-2 Hardcover
- OCLC: 1391328707

ULFA: The Mirage of Dawn is a non-fiction political science book about Assam's banned militant organization ULFA. It is written by journalist Rajeev Bhattacharyya and published by HarperCollins in 2023.

== Overview ==
Rajeev Bhattacharyya, a journalist and author of multiple books from Assam, renders exclusive research on ULFA from starting to its separation.

Pradip Phanjoubam writing for The Tribune emphasized that the book covered wide range of interviews, and, it included testimonies of rooted ULFA cadres to its heavyweight leaders giving an inner view of all plausible development of relevance."

Sudipta Datta from The Hindu writes "For his new book, The Mirage of Dawn, Rajeev Bhattacharyya travelled the ULFA trail which took him to remote places in Assam — to rebel camps in Myanmar, Bangladesh, Bhutan and New Delhi. He writes about the outfit’s “conflicting accounts of its history, the internecine squabbles within and the wide range of clandestine activities in neighbouring countries, not all of which were known to all of its own leadership.”

Jayanta Kalita for The Times of India digging into deep of the book and zeroed that the ULFA chief Paresh Baruah was able to obtain 600 weapons from a deal with Mossad from Romania-Ukraine to Bangladesh.

ETV Bharat commented that the book unearthed about four killing attacks against Paresh Baruah.

== Critical reception ==
Reviewing the book Swedish journalist Bertil Lintner opined "The book was also written recently enough to include a section about events after the February 2021 coup in Myanmar—and how the Myanmar military has, reportedly, been using Manipuri groups to fight pro-democracy forces in Chin State and Sagaing Region."

Atul K Thakur wrote for Firstpost stated that the book covered extensive issues like Operation Golden Bird, Sanjoy Ghose Killing to Chittagong Arms Haul of 2004."

Ashutosh Kumar Thakur of Outlook wrote that the book’s detailed narrative and new information make it engaging, comparing it to Nirmal Nibedon’s The Night of the Guerrillas. He noted that its ten chapters provide a comprehensive account of the banned group, particularly its overseas links and camps in Bhutan, Myanmar, and Bangladesh."

Rajesh Singh for Republica states that the book offers a remarkable history of ULFA, its formation and rise to prominence, the interplay of its principal characters, the role of foreign elements and wane in its influence.

A reviewer from NDTV noted that the first batch of ULFA militants was trained in Pakistan in 1991 to 1992 in three groups comprising a total of about 40 members. The reviewer also stated that out of those three groups, one group was trained near Peshawar and other members were taken for short visits to Kandahar in Afghanistan and the arms bazaar at Darra Adam Khel near the Safed Koh mountains in Pakistan.

Colonel Vivek Chadha (Retd) from IDSA wrote "Bhattacharyya notes the limited success of Operation Bajrang with the initial forays of the army hitting vacated ULFA camps. He further highlights issues of human rights violations that lead to the alienation of the local population (p. 99)."
