= Swaraj Abhiyan =

Indian socio-political NGO

- President: Yogendra Yadav
- Founder: Yogendra Yadav; Prashant Bhushan
- Founded: 31 July 2016 (9 years ago)
- Headquarters: A – 189, Sector 43, Noida, Uttar Pradesh 201301
- Seats in Lok Sabha: 0/545
- Seats in Haryana Legislative Assembly: 0/90

Website
- www.swarajindia.org

Swaraj Abhiyan is an Indian socio-political organisation that began with an open dialogue on 14 April 2015. It was formed by Yogendra Yadav and anti-corruption activist Prashant Bhushan in Gurgaon following their expulsion from the Aam Aadmi Party. The organisation claims to transform ideology into reality and to achieve Swaraj in all aspects of life - political, economical, social and cultural. On 31 July 2016, Swaraj Abhiyan announced the decision to form a political front, Swaraj India. Subsequently, on 2 October 2016, a political party - Swaraj India was announced, with intention to participate in local body elections to start with.

== Background ==
In late 2014, Prashant Bhushan alleged that the selection process for Aam Aadmi Party (AAP) candidates for the 2015 Delhi Legislative Assembly election was not in accordance with the founding principles of the party. This started a series of allegations and counter-allegations which resulted in the removal of Yogendra Yadav and Bhushan from the party's Political Affairs Committee in 2015.

These developments led to an open dialogue - Swaraj Samwad - conducted by supporters of Yadav and Bhushan on 14 April 2015 to discuss the situation and the future direction. The outcome was the formation of Swaraj Abhiyan.

Bhushan is current National President of Swaraj Abhiyan.

== Jai Kisan Andolan ==
Swaraj Abhiyan launched a nationwide public movement called Jai Kisan Andolan to bring attention to farmers' rights in India. This aims to highlight the plight of farmers due to alleged lapses in public policies related to agriculture. In 2015, it coordinated between small farmer groups across the country to raise voices against amendments in Land Acquisition Act, farmer compensations, rationalisation of minimum support price for crops and demanded a pay commission for farmers. Avik Saha is National Convener of Jai Kisan Andolan.

In December 2015, Prashant Bhushan filed a Public Interest Litigation with the Supreme Court of India on behalf of Swaraj Abhiyan, requesting the court's intervention to ensuring proper supply of grains, pulses and sugar through the public distribution system in drought-affected states, as prescribed by the national food security law of 2013.
