= Saffronisation =

Policies implementing Hindu nationalist views of history

Saffronisation is the right-wing policy approach in India that seeks to implement Hindu nationalist views to counter the mainstream discourse, for example in school textbooks. Critics have used this political neologism.

== Etymology ==
Saffron is considered a sacred color in Hinduism, in which it is associated with devotion, purity and the renunciation of worldly desire. Saffron is widely seen as a representative of Hinduism and other Indian religions. However, in current times it has been extensively used as a political symbol by the Hindutva movement .

== Textbook saffronisation in the 21st century ==
The right-wing Bharatiya Janata Party (BJP) was in power at the centre from 1998 to 2004. It claimed that several Indian history textbooks had overt Marxist or Eurocentric political overtones. The Prime Minister Atal Bihari Vajpayee ordered to change the NCERT textbooks and the SCERT textbooks in states where NDA was in power. There were waves of saffronisation in his tenure.

The BJP has had trouble changing the textbooks, because many states in which the BJP or NDA is not in power have blocked saffronisation efforts. The BJP, citing a rigid anti-Hindu agenda, restructured SCERTs (of states where NDA was in power), NCERT and the Indian Council of Historical Research (ICHR) to make textbooks conform to the BJP's Hindu nationalist platform. In states where the BJP or NDA had control of local government, textbooks were changed extensively to favour a Hindu nationalist narrative.

These changes included the omission of caste-based exclusion and violence throughout Indian history, exclusion or minimisation of contributions to Indian society made by Muslims, omission of world history, and glorifying and elaborating the Hindu rulers' governance and achievements. Minimising details of Muslim and British rule, as well as the role of Congress in the freedom struggle.

In Science and Mathematics textbooks, the Indian scientists and mathematicians were given increased importance compared to their foreign counterparts. Vedic Science and Vedic Mathematics were taught. In English literature textbooks, the works of Indian writers were included, while the works of foreign writers were largely excluded.

Efforts were undertaken in 2005 to reverse the saffronisation of textbooks previously made by BJP, spearheaded by the Indian National Congress, India's second biggest political party and the BJP's main rival. But in states where NDA was still in power, the local government did not follow the de-saffronisation of the UPA-led central government.

When the Hindustan Times reviewed the issue of saffronisation of Indian textbooks in late 2014, it noted that right-wing efforts to change how textbooks recount history faced "some difficulty as it lacks credible historians to back its claims." The medieval period in India is one such hotly contested epoch among historians. Since there can be no true consensus about that era due to divided and deeply entrenched political motivations, history for that period is highly subjective and particularly vulnerable to the influence of the textbook writer's sympathies and outlook. "The choice of the textbook writer is more decisive than anything else," it was noted in a report in The Hindu. Critics have said that the changes to the textbooks have portrayed the medieval period as "a dark age of Islamic colonial rule which snuffed out the glories of the Hindu and Buddhist empires that preceded it". Another trap in the politicisation of history relates to contention over the state of Jammu and Kashmir.

By mid-2015, The Times of India reported that the NCERT had participated in a meeting convened by the Ministry of Human Resource Development, and during that meeting, the issue of changing textbooks was discussed. An official from the ICHR complained that the theme of nationalism did not receive proper treatment in textbooks, setting the stage for possible textbook revisions.

The state government of Rajasthan reportedly spent Rs 37 crore to reprint 36 textbooks used for classes 1 to 8 for the 2016–2017 academic session that will be based on an agenda that would promote the Indian culture. The textbooks that had been approved up to the 2012–13 academic session were rendered obsolete under the rewriting of history, and those books were auctioned off. In total, 5.66 crore new textbooks were ordered and printed for an agenda that critics described was intent on supporting the saffronisation of textbooks. Rajasthan (primary and secondary) education minister Vasudev Devnani denied the charge of saffronisation, but educationists described his decision as the "Hinduisation of education" that occurs when right-wing forces come to power.

The state government of Karnataka has reportedly ordered new textbooks for the 2017–18 academic session in an effort that academicians and critics have described as a "blatant attempt to saffronise textbooks".

Saffronisation has also been attempted to portray Mahatma Gandhi's Hindu-nationalist assassin Nathuram Godse in a heroic manner, as well as other Hindutva leaders like Vinayak Damodar Savarkar, and M. S. Golwalkar.

Some major changes include the removal of chapters dealing with Islam and its origins, as well as cutting down content about Mughal dynasty rule in India. Recent changes involve replacement of the name Babri Masjid with "a 3-dome structure" and removal of discussions about Ram Rath Yatra, secular debates about the demolition, and consequences of said demolition. This has led to a polarised perspective.

== Violence ==
There are also several instances of political violence in institutes and intimidation of academic, which has also including prominent ministers of the state for example in West Bengal, a state renowned for its culture of intellectualism, state cabinet minister Dilip Ghosh directed BJP cadres to physically assault intellectuals opposed to the newly formed Suvendu Adhikary ministry by throwing eggs at them, whereas Adhikari himself led a rally consisting of sadhus and BJP cadres to Jadavpur University in order to intimidate the predominant left-wing student activists of the campus, whom he accused of spreading anti-Hindu and anti-Indian sentiments. The incident led to violent clash on Jadavpur University campus between RSS-affiliated ABVP student body, right-wing outfits that barged onto campus and left-wing student bodies. The incident is criticized for ineffective action by police officials, denial of incidents by the Adhikary administration, and violence related to saffronisation of institutes.

== See also ==
- Anti-intellectualism
- NCERT textbook controversies
- Communalism (South Asia)
- Saffron terror
- Indian Knowledge Systems
- Anti-national

== Sources ==
- Bénéï, Véronique (2005). Manufacturing Citizenship: education and nationalism in Europe, South Asia and China. Routledge. pp. 156–159. ISBN 0-415-36488-4.
- Ninan, Ann (February 2000). "India: Righting or rewriting Hindu history". Inter Press Service. Archived from the original on 16 May 2006.
- Upadhyay, Ray (21 August 2001). "The Politics of Education in India". South Asia Analysis Group. Archived from the original on 17 December 2005.
- Bhatt, Chetan & Mukta, Parita (2000). "Hindutva in the West: mapping the antinomies of diaspora nationalism". Ethnic and Racial Studies. 23 (3): 407–441. doi:10.1080/014198700328935. S2CID 143287533.
- Biswas, Titas (2020). "Pedagogical Curricula and Educational Media: The Malignancy of Saffronised Otherisation in India". Zoon Politikon (11/2020): 146–199.
