= Kachin =

Kachin or Kakhyen may refer to:

== Places ==
- Kachin State, in northern Myanmar/Burma
- Kachin Hills, northeastern Myanmar

== People ==
- Kachin peoples, a generalised term for six non-Burman ethno-linguistic groups in Kachin State.
  - Kachin people, including the main sub-branch of the Kachin people, for whom the term Jingpo (used in Yunnan, China) and Kachin (used in Myanmar) are considered interchangeable, and the Singpho people, members of the ethnic group living in Yunnan and Arunachal Pradesh, India.
- Jingphaw language, or Kachin language

== Species ==
- Kachin (spider), an extinct genus of Uloboridae
- Kachin red-backed vole, a species of rodent
- Kachin woolly bat, a species of bat

== Other uses ==
- A 'relaxed' variant of Lethwei martial arts
- Kachin Independence Army, Insurgent outfit of Myanmar
- Kachin conflict, Armed conflict in northern Myanmar
- Kachin Independence Organisation, Political party in Myanmar

== See also ==
- Jingpo (disambiguation)
- Kachin-Luic languages or Jinghpaw languages
