= Vedic science =

Pseudoscientific system of knowledge based on the Vedas

Vedic science refers to a pseudoscientific system of knowledge based on the Vedas, a large body of religious texts originating in ancient India.

== See also ==
- Hindu cosmology
- Indian mathematics
- Indian units of measurement
- Indo-Arabic numeral system
- History of science and technology on the Indian subcontinent
- Shastra
- Vimana

Similar and related phenomena:

- Creation science – Pseudoscientific form of Young Earth creationism
- Ayurveda
- Hindu views on evolution § Hindu creationism
- Epic-Puranic chronology § Archaeological vs. traditional interpretations
