= Sanjib Baruah =

Indian political scientist (born 1951)

- Born: 1951 (age 74–75); Shillong, Assam
- Occupations: Academic, writer

Sanjib Baruah is an Indian professor of Political Studies at Bard College in New York, and an author and commentator specializing in the politics of Northeast India. His books include India Against Itself: Assam and the Politics of Nationality, Durable Disorder: Understanding the Politics of Northeast India, and In the Name of the Nation: India and its Northeast.

== Early life and career ==
Baruah was born in 1951 in Shillong, which was then the capital of Assam. (Note: Shillong was the capital of undivided Assam until 21 January 1972 when it became part of the new state of Meghalaya; the redefined start of Assam forming its capital at Dispur in Guwahati.)

Baruah obtained his Bachelor of Arts from Cotton College, Guwahati, Assam. He went on to complete his Master of Arts from the University of Delhi. He has said the experience of New Delhi and its intellectual and political life had a profound impact on him.

From 1985 to 1987 Sanjib Baruah worked as an Associate of Committee on Southern Asian Studies at the University of Chicago, the institution that awarded him his PhD. He said at interview that his research into the Northeast India topic only really began some time after he had completed his PhD.

Baruah has been serving as a professor at Bard College in New York state. Since 1989 Sanjib Baruah was a research associate at South Asia Center at Syracuse University.

Baruah also holds a concurrent position as Global Fellow at the Peace Research Institute in Oslo, Norway.

== Selected works ==
=== Books ===
- India Against Itself: Assam and the Politics of Nationality. University of Pennsylvania Press. 1999. ISBN 9780812234916.
- Durable Disorder: Understanding the Politics of Northeast India. Oxford: Oxford University Press. 2012 [2005]. OCLC 1120638444.
- Postfrontier blues: toward a new policy framework for Northeast India. Policy studies. East-West Center Washington. 2007. ISBN 9781932728606.
- Beyond Counterinsurgency: Breaking the Impasse in Northeast India. New York; New Delhi: Oxford University Press. 2009 [2009]. ISBN 9780198078975. OCLC 775416874.
- Ethnonationalism in India: A Reader. Critical issues in Indian politics. New Delhi: Oxford University Press. 2012. OCLC 930806555.
- In the Name of the Nation. Stanford University Press. 2020. ISBN 9781503611290.

=== Journals ===
- Baruah, Sanjib (1 November 2003). "Nationalizing Space: Cosmetic Federalism and the Politics of Development in Northeast India". Development and Change. 34 (5). Estados Unidos : Institute of Social Studies: 915–939. doi:10.1111/j.1467-7660.2003.00334.x. OCLC 926308153.

=== Interviews and commentaries ===
Baruah has been sought for commentaries and interviews over a wide range of publications including: Time Magazine; The New York Times; Times of India; The Statesman (India); TRT World; The Indian Express; Scroll.in; The Wire (India); and Al Jazeera English.

== Awards and honors ==
- 2021 ICAS Book Prize, Most Accessible and Captivating Work for the Non-Specialist Reader Accolade, from the International Convention of Asia Scholars

== Sources ==
- Baruah; Rebecca, Sanjib (27 November 2008). Sanjib Baruah Interview part 1. Heidelberg University, Germany. Archived from the original on 27 January 2022 – via YouTube.
