= Sangeeta Barooah Pisharoty =

Indian journalist and writer

Sangeeta Barooah Pisharoty is an Indian journalist and writer from the state of Assam, based in the city of New Delhi. Currently the National Affairs Editor with the digital news publication The Wire, she was formerly a special correspondent of the English language national newspaper The Hindu. She has been the subject of widespread critical acclaim for the documentation on the Assam Movement, the Assam Accord and the insurgencies in Assam in her debut book Assam: The Accord, The Discord.

Barooah Pisharoty has been the recipient of a fellowship from the Centre for Development Studies since 2011 following her series of news stories on the loss of livelihood caused by soil erosion on Assam's Majuli island. In 2017, she was the recipient of the Ramnath Goenka Excellence in Journalism Awards for her reportage on housing segregation among Hindus and Muslims in the city of Delhi.

She is a alumna of the Guwahati University from where she graduated in 1995. Barooah Pisharoty began her career at the national news agency United News of India and was notably the first woman from Northeast India to be employed at the agency's New Delhi Headquarters.
